= Nissan Serena =

Minivan produced by Nissan

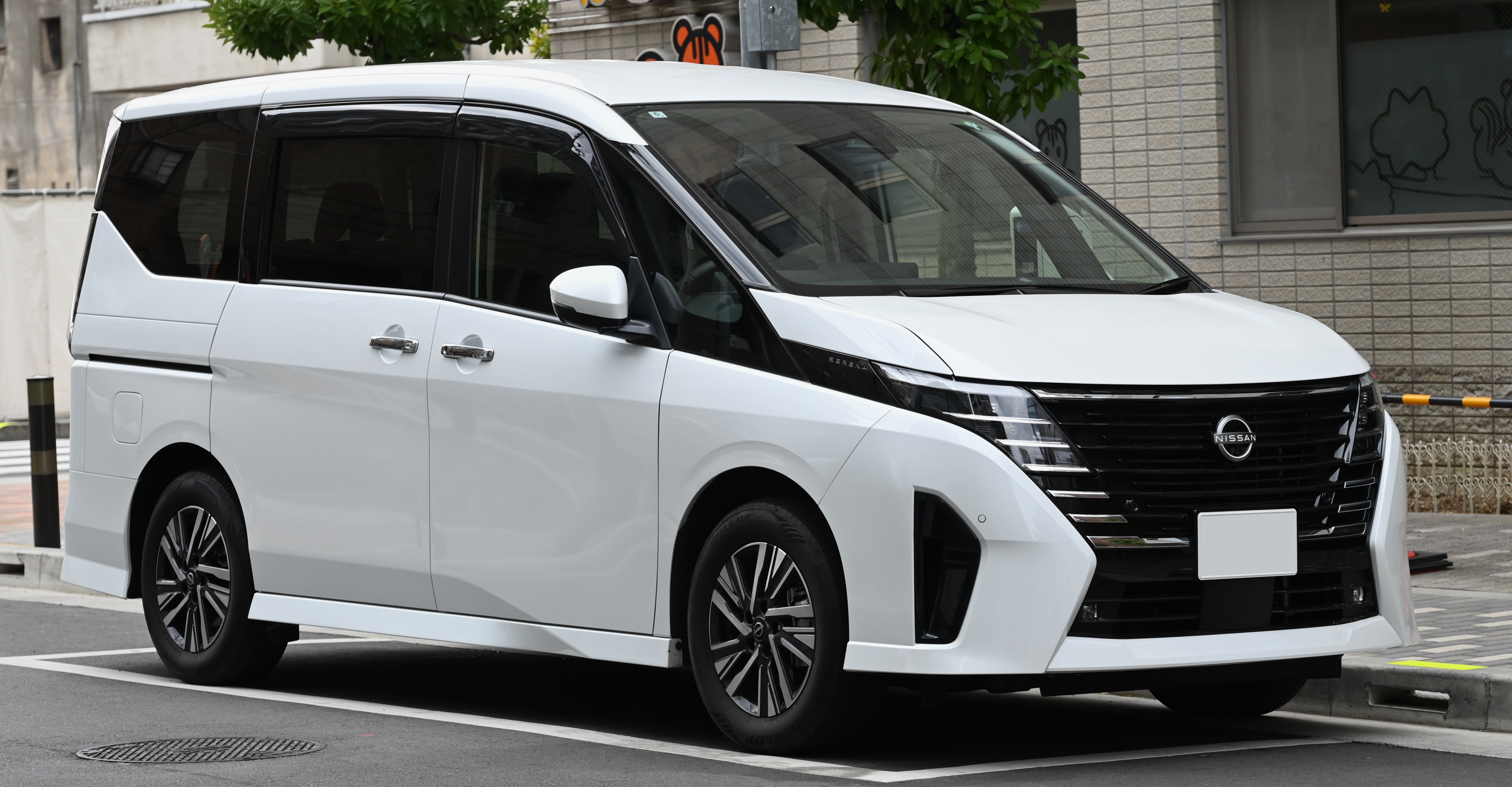
- Nissan Serena e-Power Highway Star V (GFC28, Japan)

Overview
- Manufacturer: Nissan
- Also called: Nissan Vanette Serena (1991–1994); Suzuki Landy (Japan, 2007–2022)
- Production: 1991–present

Body and chassis
- Class: Minivan
- Layout: Front mid-engine, rear-wheel-drive (1991–1999); Front-engine, front-wheel-drive (1999–present); Front-engine, four-wheel-drive (1991–present)

Chronology
- Predecessor: Nissan Vanette (Asia and Europe)
- Successor: Nissan Primastar (for C23, Europe)

The Nissan Serena (Japanese: 日産・セレナ, Hepburn: Nissan Serena) is a minivan manufactured by Nissan, joining the slightly larger Vanette. The car was engineered by Nissan's Aichi Manufacturing Division and launched in 1991 as a compact passenger van, and it grew larger with each generation over the years. Earlier versions were front-engine, rear-wheel-drive layout with a live axle mounted on leaf springs, while the following generations are front-wheel drive or 4WD.

The Serena is designed to comply with Japanese vehicle class, which means its external dimensions are restricted to 4.7 meters in length and 1.7 meters in width. It slots below the larger Nissan Elgrand in Japan as a smaller, cheaper alternative. Competitors include the Toyota Noah, the Honda Stepwgn, and the Mitsubishi Delica.

Its name is from the Latin word "serēnus", meaning "clear, tranquil, pleasant".

The Serena was rebadged and marketed by Suzuki as the Suzuki Landy (Japanese: スズキ・ランディ, Hepburn: Suzuki Randi) between 2007 and 2022. The Serena-based Landy was discontinued and replaced by an all-new version that is based on the Toyota Noah starting in 2022, when the fourth generation Noah was released.

As with the larger Elgrand, Autech offers a tuned, modified version of the Serena.

== First generation (C23; 1991) ==
First generation
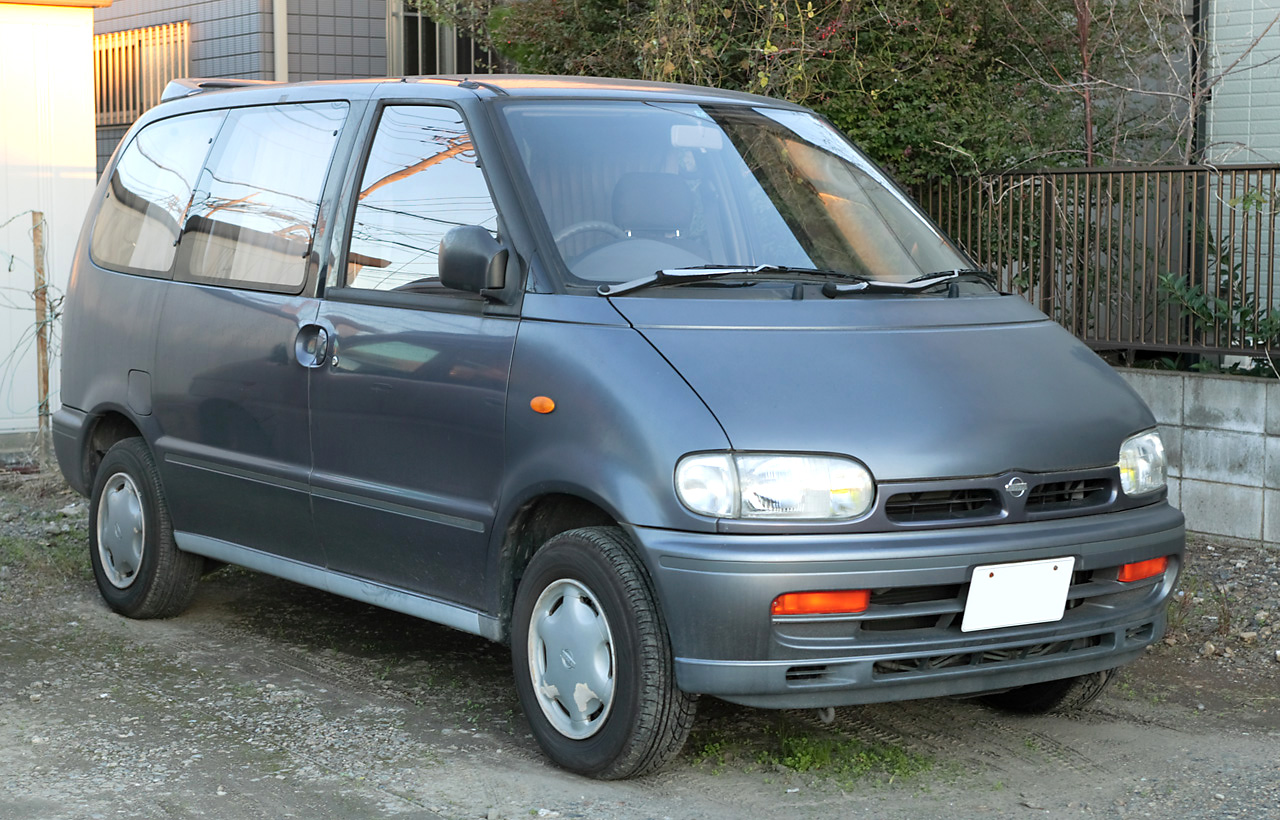
- Nissan Serena 2.0 FX (pre-facelift, Japan)

Overview
- Model code: C23
- Also called: Nissan Vanette Cargo/E; Nissan Vanette Serena; LDV Cub
- Production: 1991–2001
- Assembly: Japan: Yokosuka, Kanagawa (Oppama Plant); Spain: Barcelona; Malaysia: Kuala Lumpur

Body and chassis
- Body style: 4-door minivan
- Layout: Front mid-engine, rear-wheel-drive

Powertrain
- Engine: Petrol: 1.6 L GA16DE I4; 2.0 L SR20DE I4; 2.4 L KA24DE I4; Diesel: 2.0 L CD20 I4; 2.0 L CD20T/CD20ET/CD20ETi turbo I4
- Transmission: 5-speed manual; 4-speed automatic

Dimensions
- Wheelbase: 2,735 mm (107.7 in)
- Length: 4,355–4,380 mm (171.5–172.4 in)
- Width: 1,695 mm (66.7 in)
- Height: 1,825–1,915 mm (71.9–75.4 in)
- Curb weight: 1,250–1,610 kg (2,756–3,549 lb) (2WD); 1,610–1,730 kg (3,549–3,814 lb) (4WD)

Chronology
- Successor: Nissan Primastar (Europe); Nissan Presage (Largo, Japan)

Models were manufactured in Japan from 1991 onwards, and many were imported into Australasia and the United Kingdom. Japanese-market Serena were available in some grades - PX, FX, FG, SX, FE, were available in all-wheel drive drivetrain, and VX, LX and L only available in front-wheel drive. Full-Auto (full-time) 4WD versions were also produced providing greater stability and better handling. The naturally aspirated 2.3 L diesel was never manufactured for the Japanese market and its seating arrangement and interior fittings are not the same as the 2.0 L petrol (SR20DE), 2.0 L diesel CD20 and turbo-diesel CD20T models manufactured in Japan for the local market. It was exclusive to Japanese Nissan dealerships called Nissan Bluebird Store.

Throughout its production the C23 model underwent several facelifts although the interior design and body largely remained unchanged, for example, addition of airbags and bench seats for the second and third rows. Each facelift model can be identified by front grille design which was updated in 1994 and 1997.

In European markets, the C23 Serena had 1.6 or 2.0 L petrols, or 2.3 L diesel engines LD23. Trim levels were LX, SLX, SGX and SGXi. Auto Express once named the Serena as the slowest passenger car in the benchmark 0-60 mph (later became 62 mph) test, with the 2.3 L diesel version (added in the mid-1990s) taking 27.8 seconds to reach that speed.

Until around 2002, the most common petrol engine was the SR20DE, accompanied by the 1.6-litre GA16DE. A variety of other engines were used over the years, including diesels specifically the CD20 (for the commercial van version), CD20T 1,973 cc Diesel Turbo, and the CD20ET.

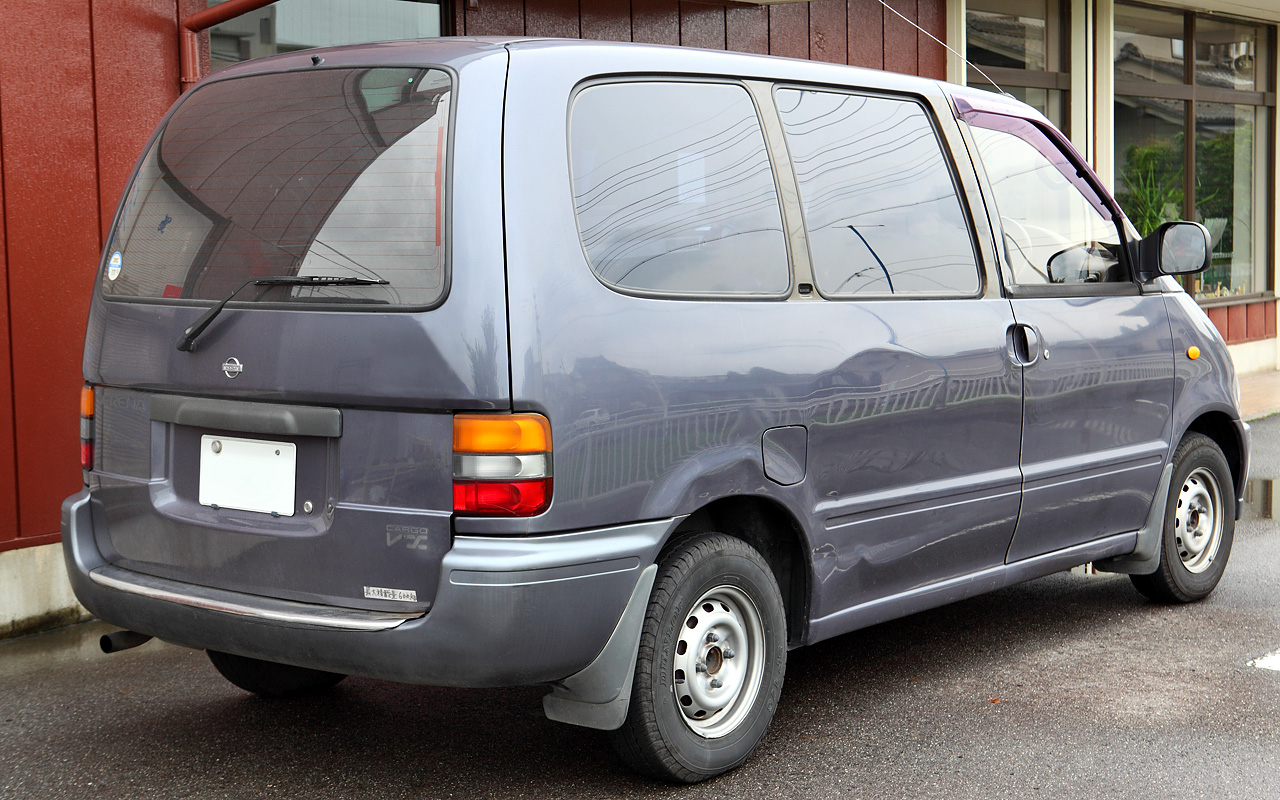
Nissan Serena Cargo VX (Japan)

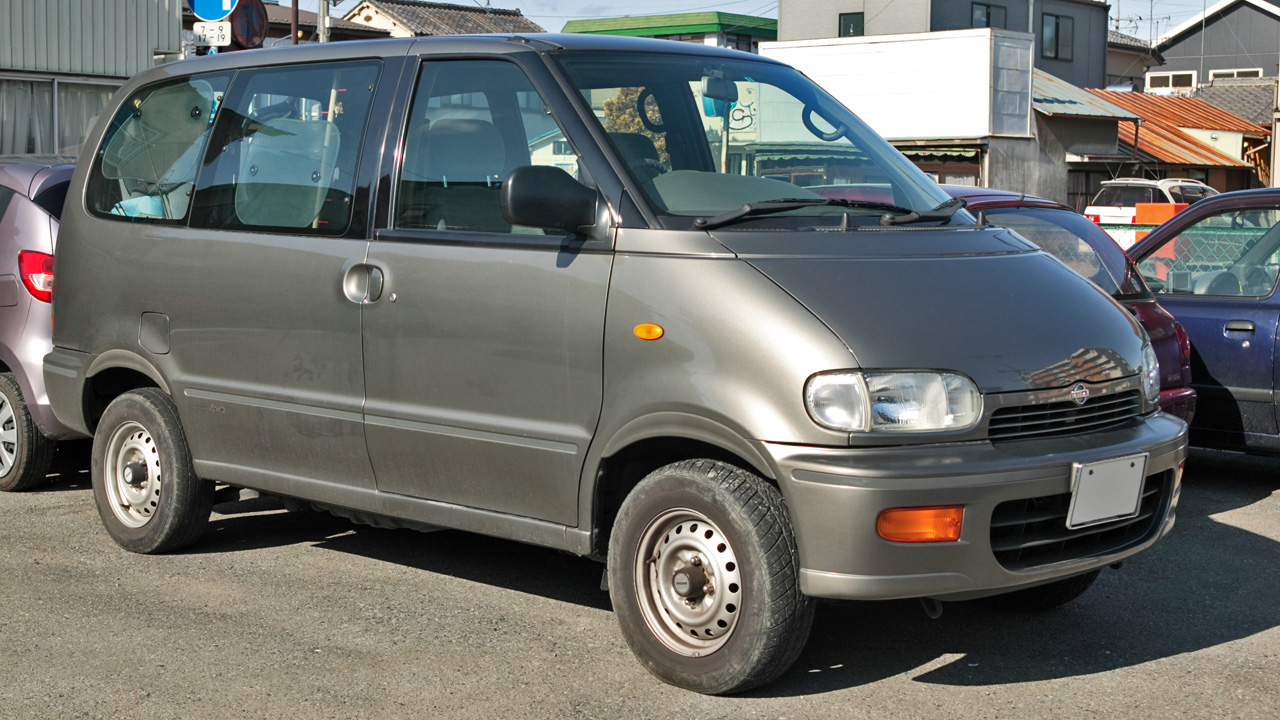
Nissan Serena FX (first facelift, Japan)

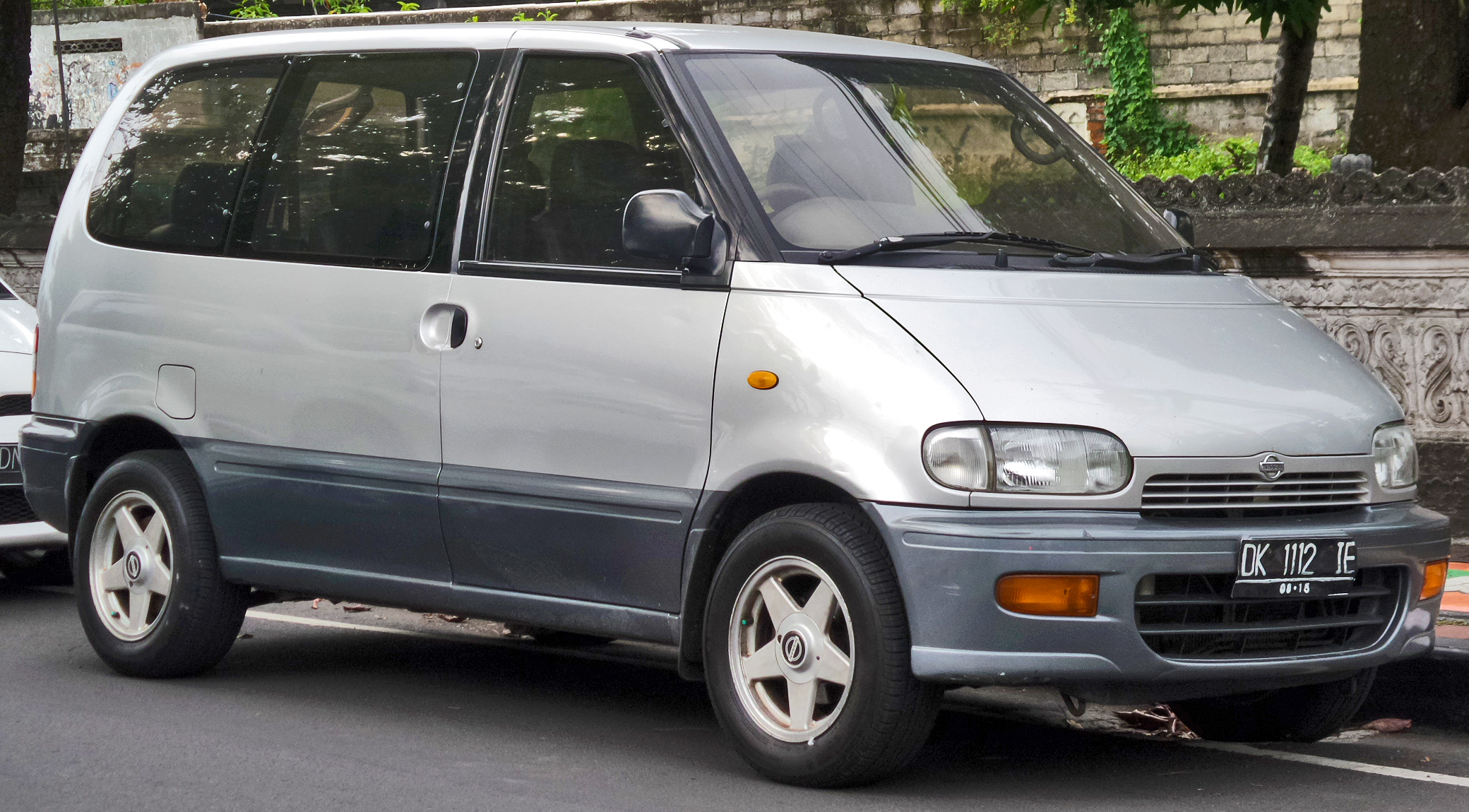
Nissan Serena (first facelift, Indonesia)

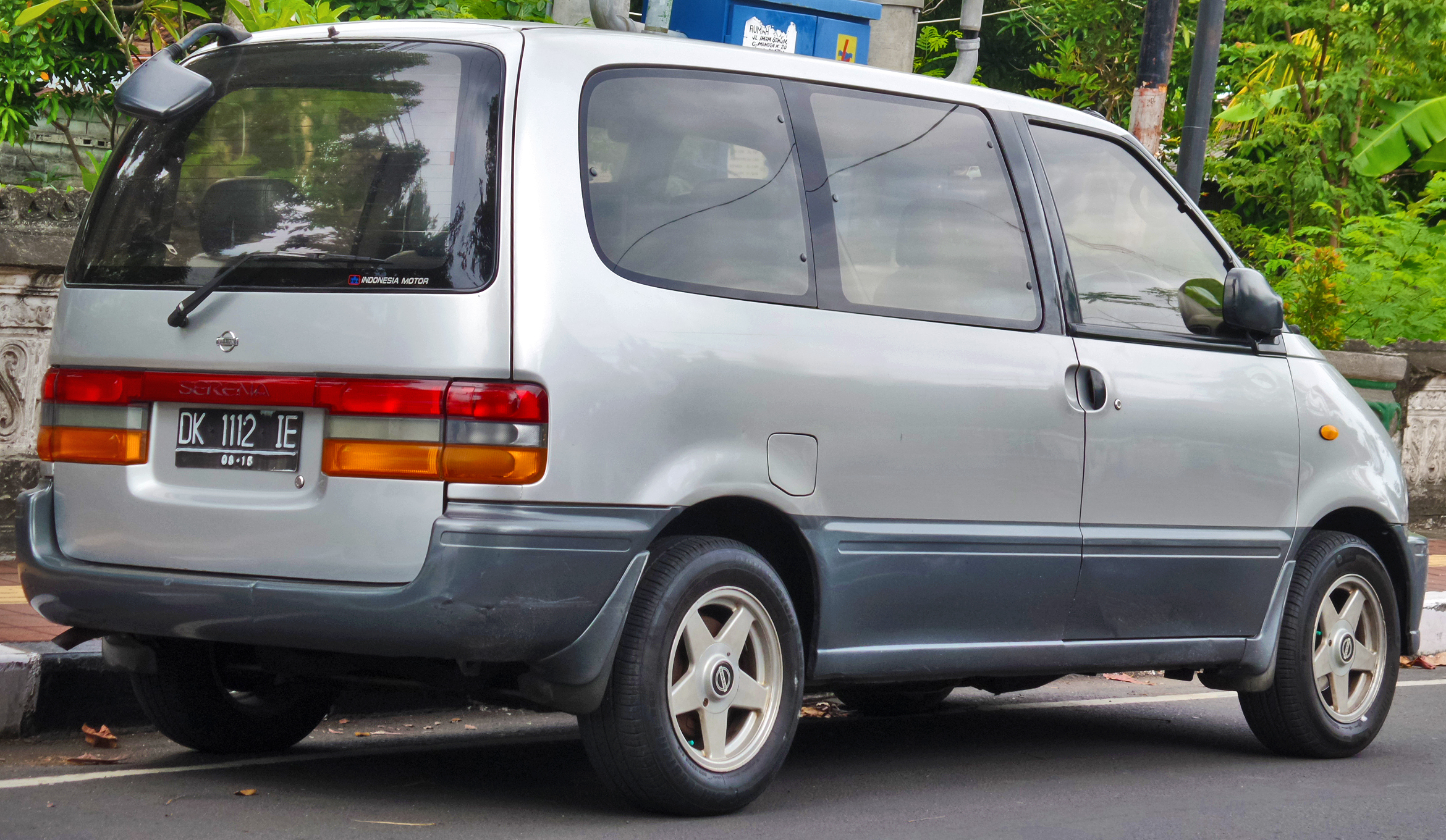
Nissan Serena (first facelift, Indonesia)

Serena Highway Star

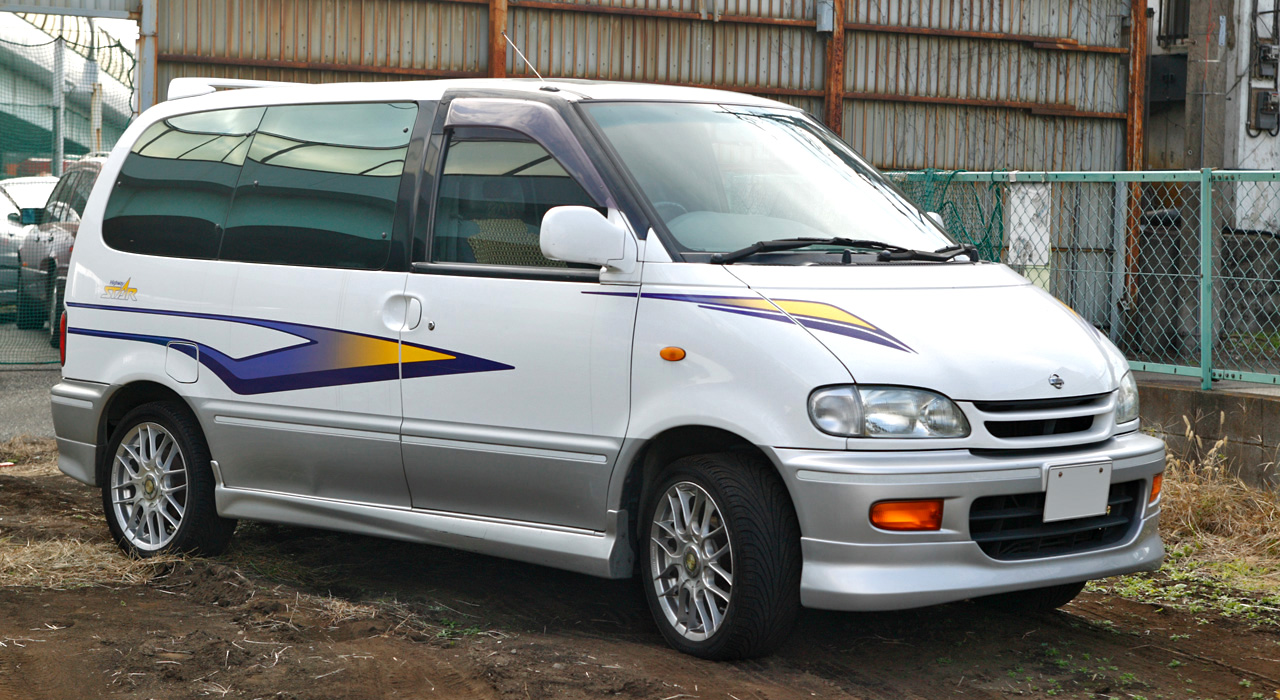
Nissan Serena Highway Star (second facelift, Japan)

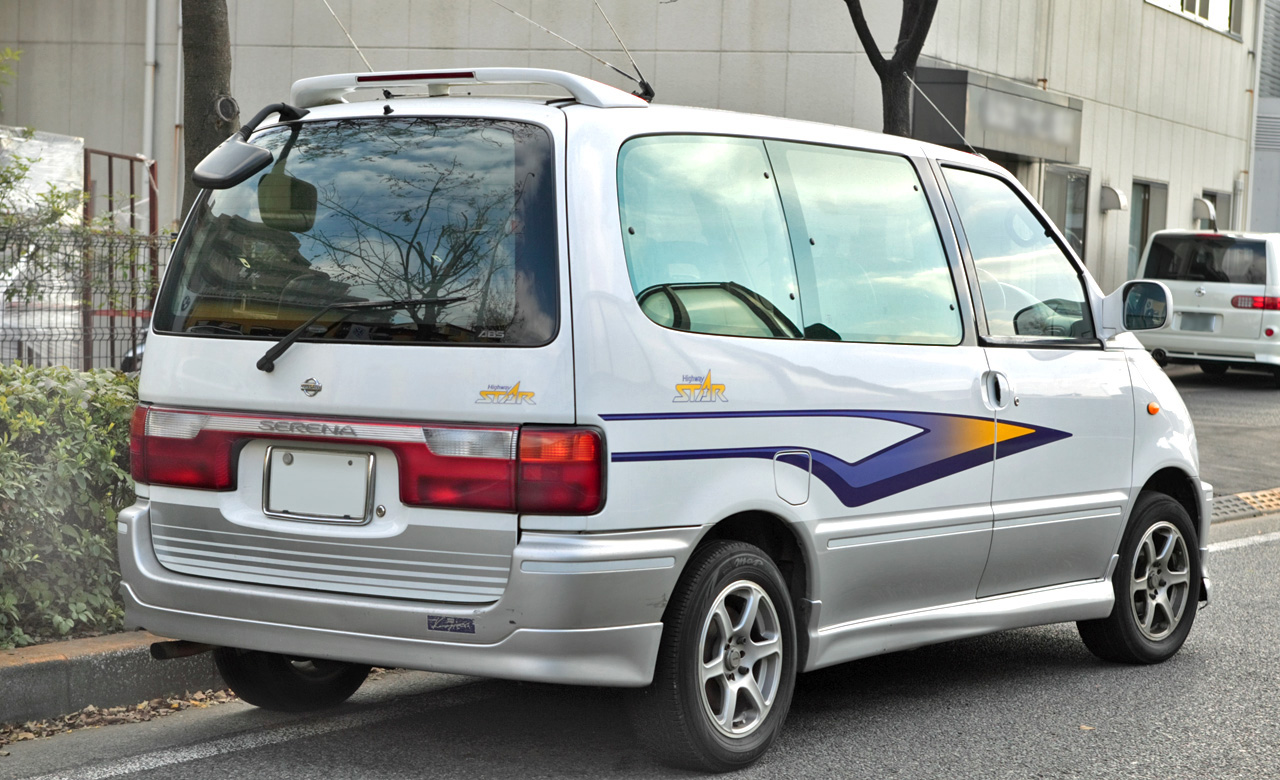
Nissan Serena Highway Star (second facelift, Japan)

=== Europe ===
The Nissan Vanette was a series of small vans manufactured in Spain by Nissan alongside the European market Serena models. The van was produced in two versions, the Vanette E, which shared the basic body shell with the Nissan Serena people carrier, differing only in not having rear windows and passenger seats, and the Vanette Cargo, which was longer and had a higher roof line from behind the front seats.

In June 1998, LDV Group entered into an agreement with Nissan to sell a rebranded version of the Vanette Cargo. This was named the LDV Cub and was sold alongside the Vanette in Britain. The model was discontinued in 2001 and replaced by a rebadged version of the Renault Trafic called the Nissan Primastar, which is produced in Luton, England and Barcelona, Spain.

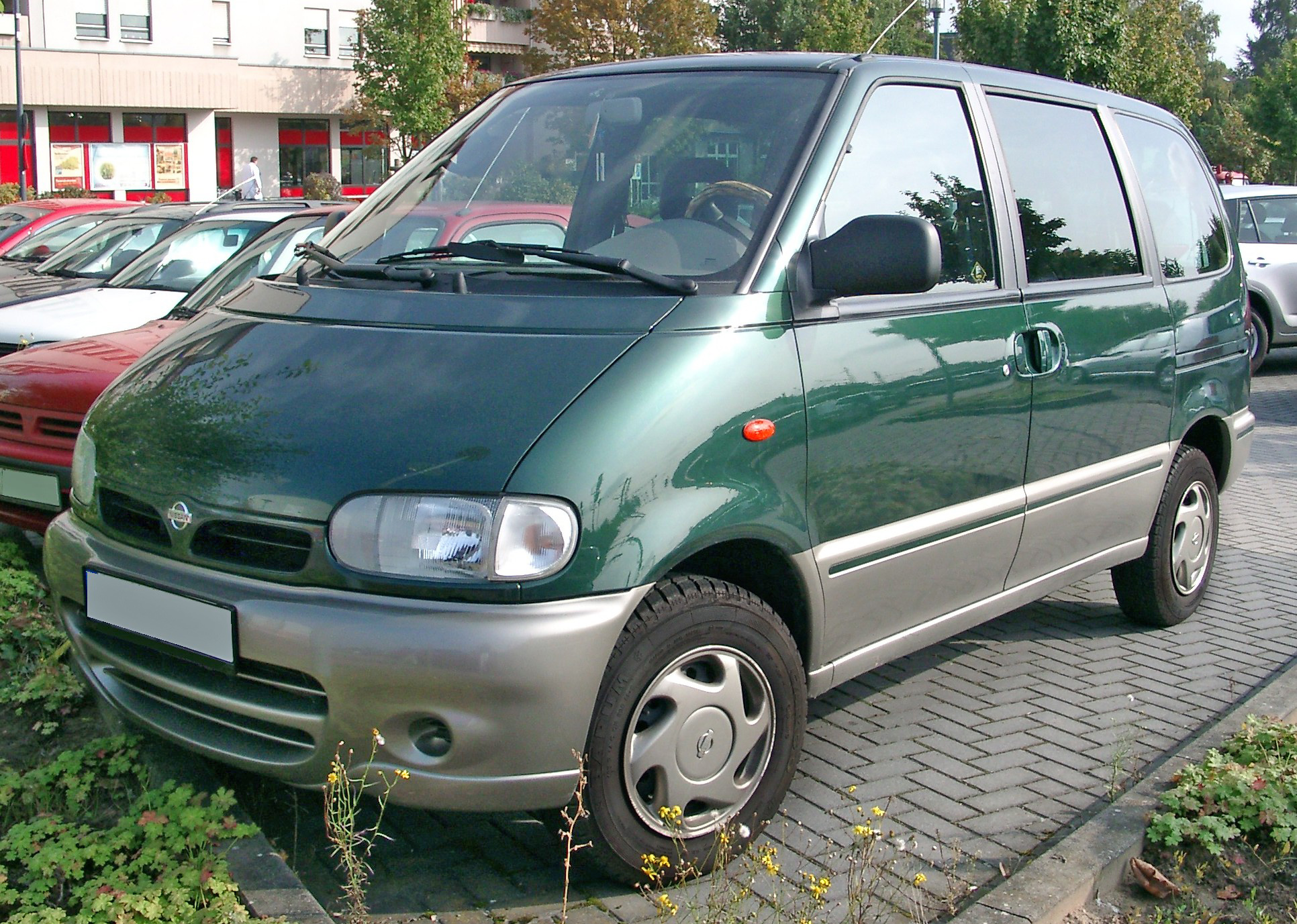
Nissan Serena (facelift, Germany)

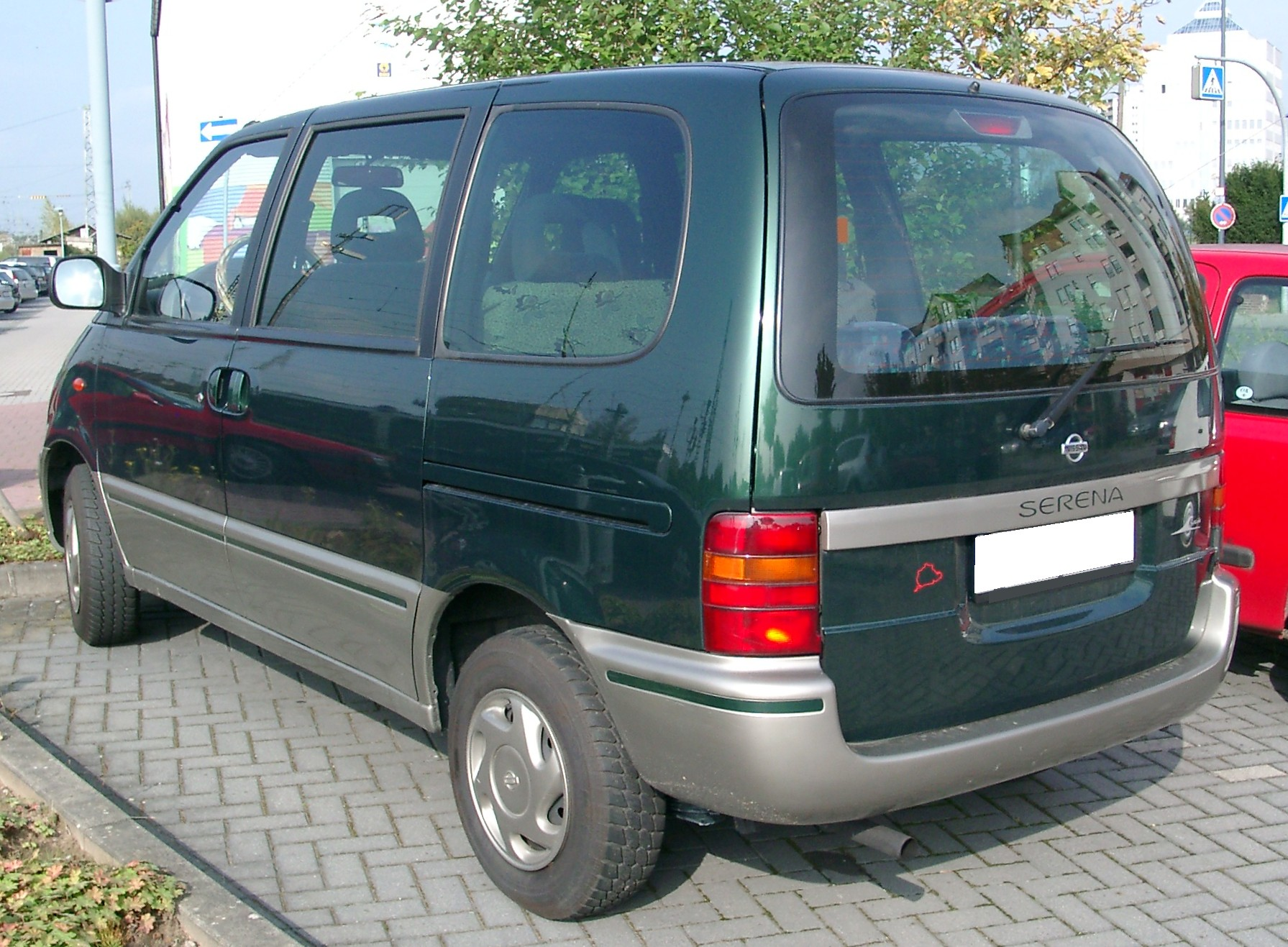
Nissan Serena (facelift, Germany)

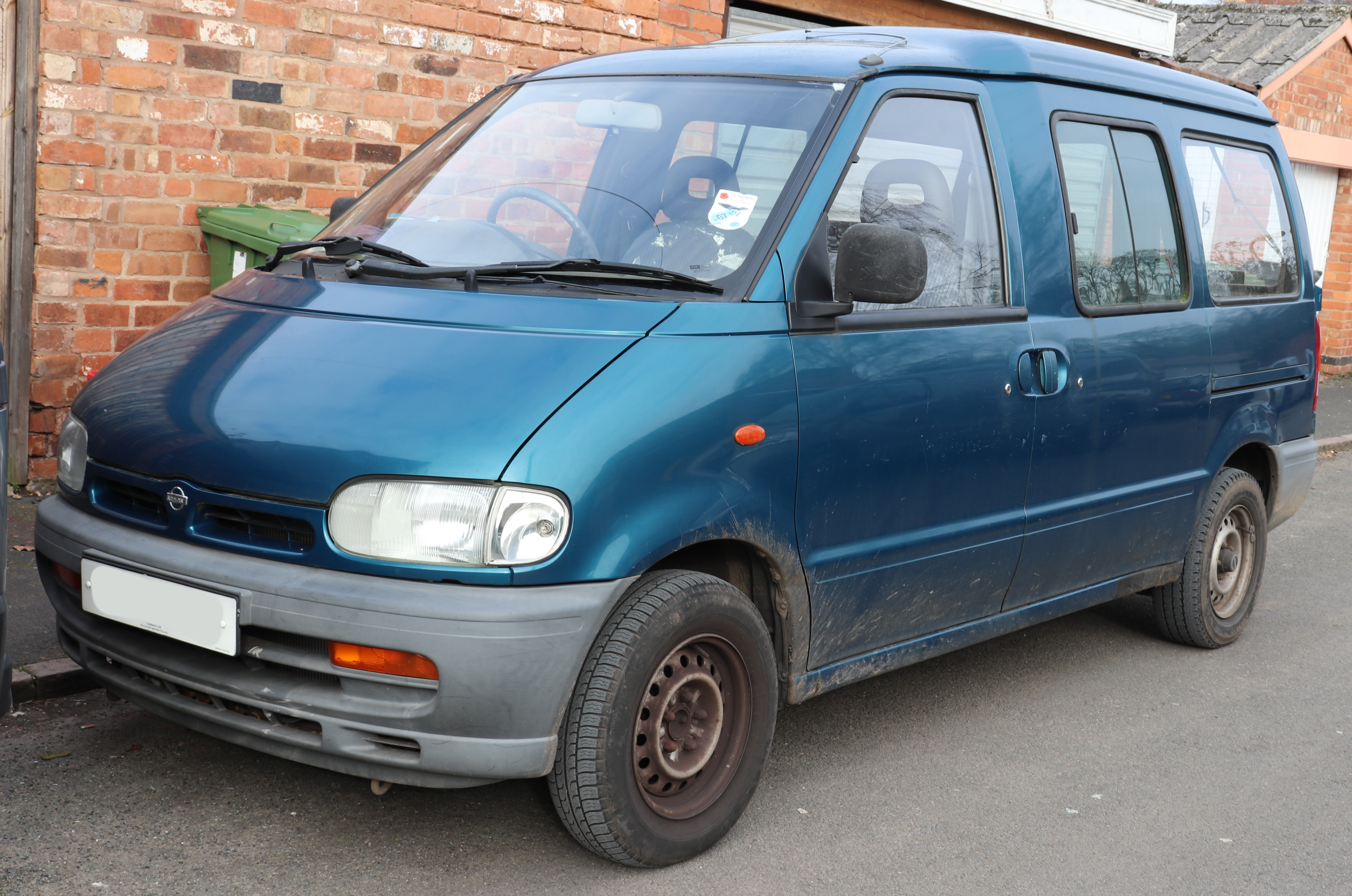
Nissan Vanette Cargo (pre-facelift)

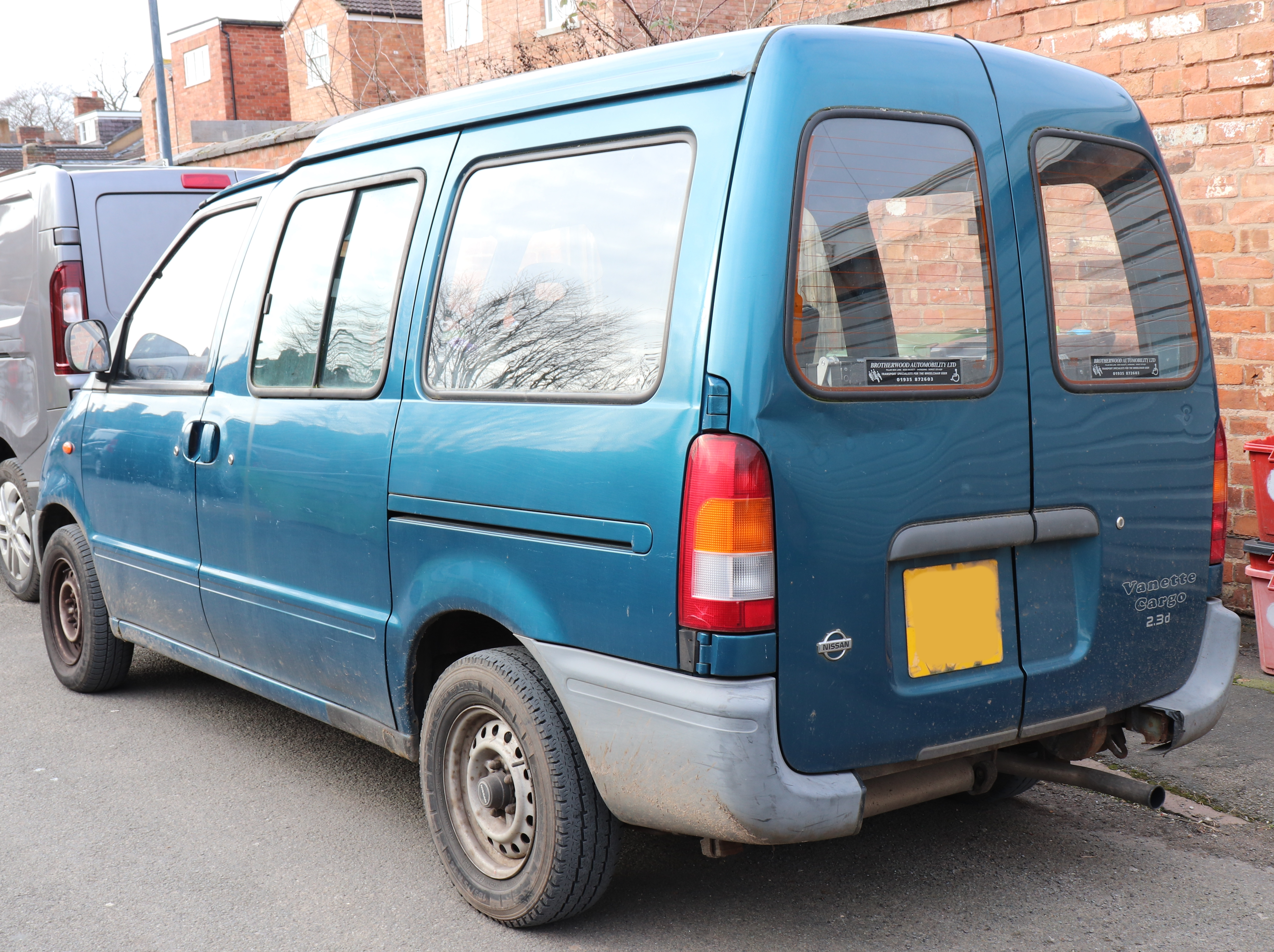
Nissan Vanette Cargo (pre-facelift)

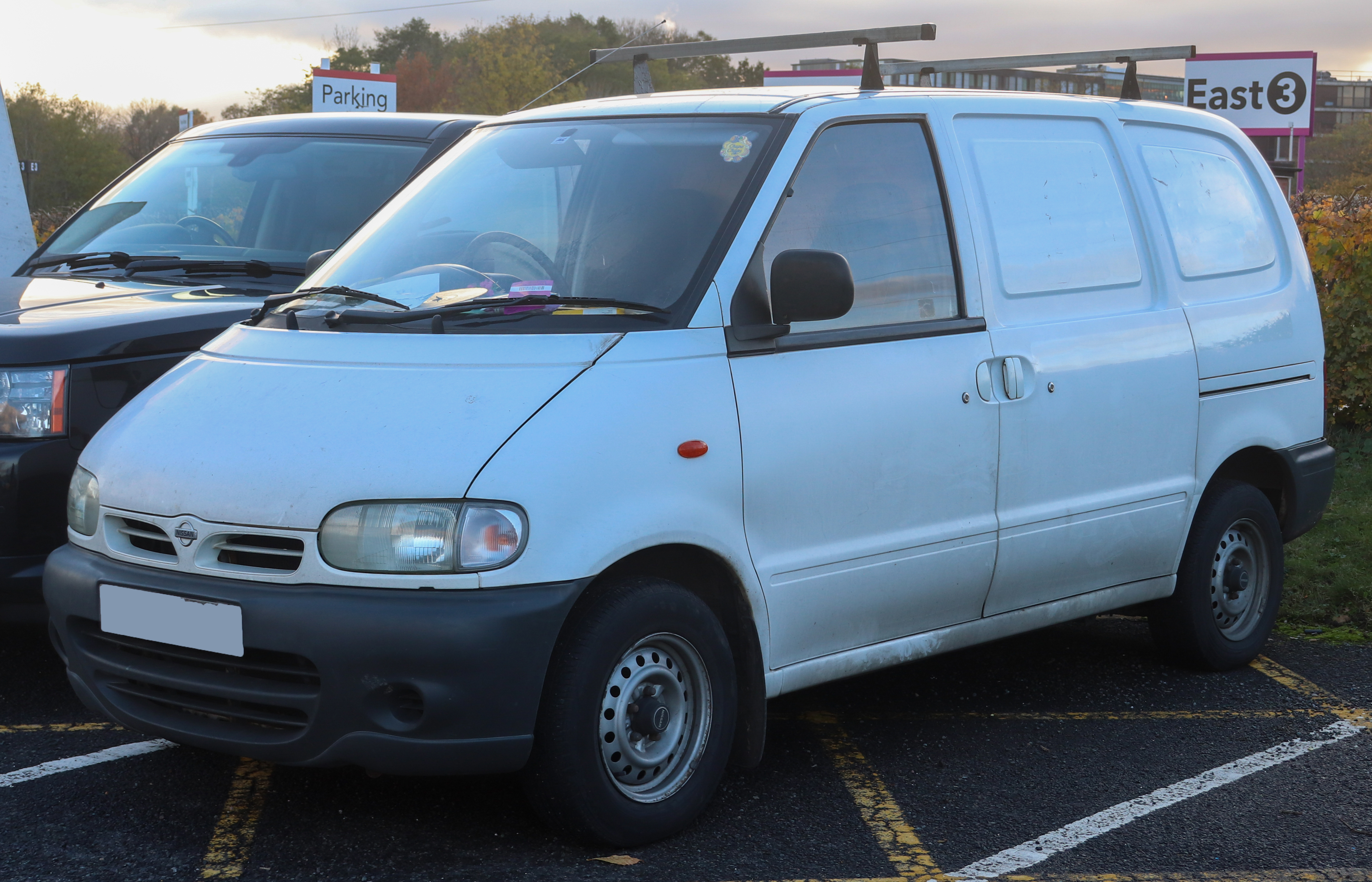
Nissan Vanette E (facelift)

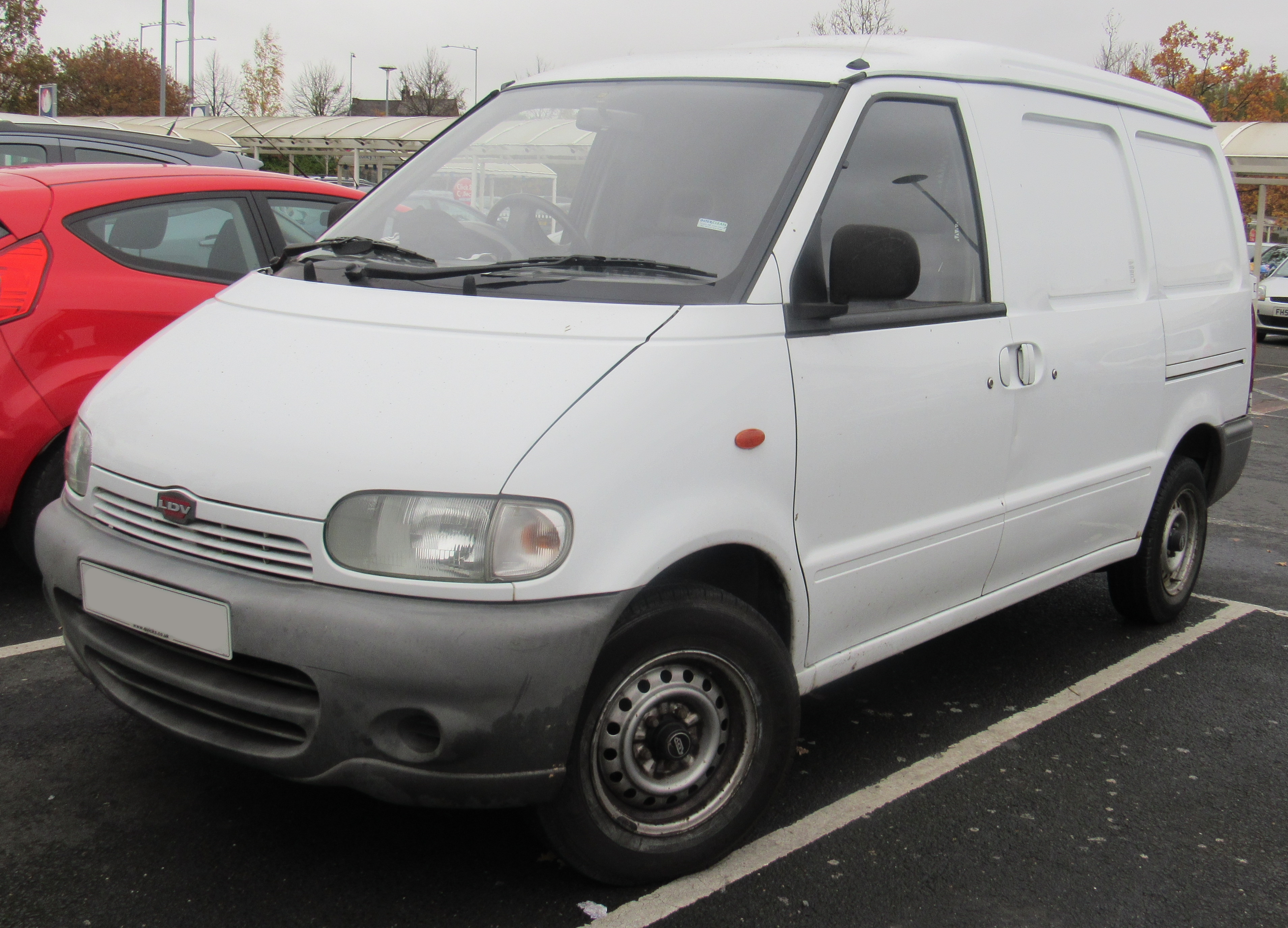
LDV Cub

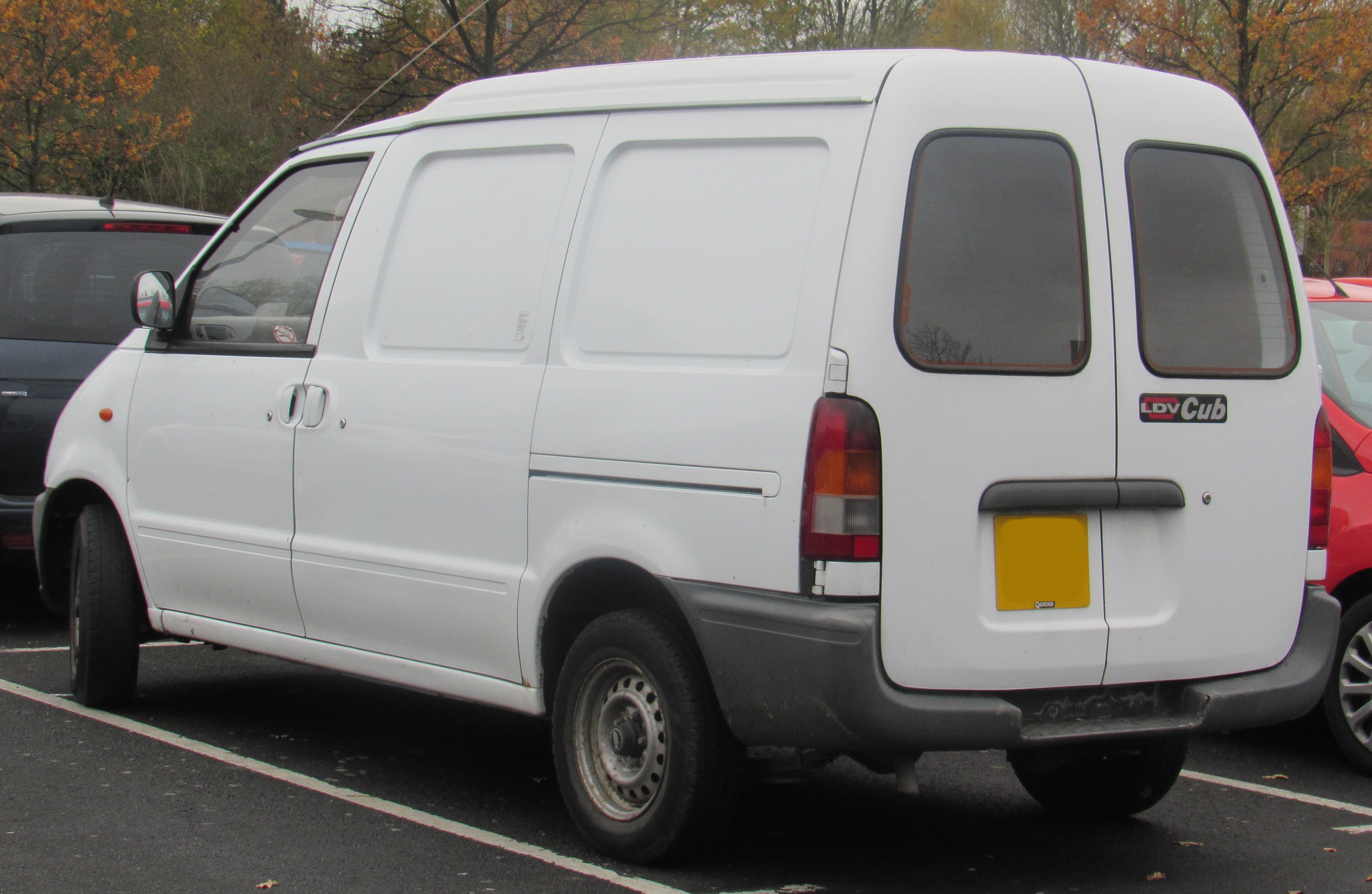
LDV Cub rear

=== Reputation ===
The Nissan Serena Mk1 is said to have an image problem by some, in particular Fifth Gear presenter Quentin Willson, who remarked in a 1997 Top Gear episode that "...the Nissan Serena was about as seductive as a skip and as desirable as an old shoe."

By 2000, the Nissan Serena was described as the worst new car sale on Britain, by Top Gear's Buyers Guide, with "absolutely nothing to recommend it for".

Although the Nissan Serena handles better than most people expect it to (due to its mid-mounted engine), its power-to-weight ratio is particularly poor, as shown by the 0–100 km/h averages listed below. For those wanting performance cars, the only models with marginally acceptable acceleration are powered by the SR20DE engine, but all models are acceptable for the target family-car user, as shown by sales figures.

=== Nissan Largo (W30) ===
The rebodied version called the Largo was unveilled in 21 May 1993. The available trim levels, from lowest to highest, were RX-G, SX-G and Grandage. In Japan, the W30 Largo held the position of the top-of-the-line model among Nissan's minivans.

The Recreational Vehicle "Umibozu" was released in 1994, features a front guard bar and large fog lamps. In addition, an 8-seat variant called the Plus was also released.

The Largo was available with either a 2.4 L KA24DE I4 petrol produces 145 PS (143 hp; 107 kW), and a 2.0 L CD20ETi, produces 105 PS (104 hp; 77 kW) and 242 N⋅m (178 lb⋅ft). Both engines use a mid-engine layout (under the front seat).

The Nissan Largo got a minor facelift on 21 October 1996. The Highway Star variant was added from 1995.

Unlike the previous Largo, which was essentially a widened C22 Nissan Vanette Largo, the W30 Largo was a totally rebodied, wider Serena with more equipment such as four-wheel-drive. It was exclusive to Nissan Satio Store locations as a large load carrying vehicle next to the Sunny.

Production was ceased in May 1999.

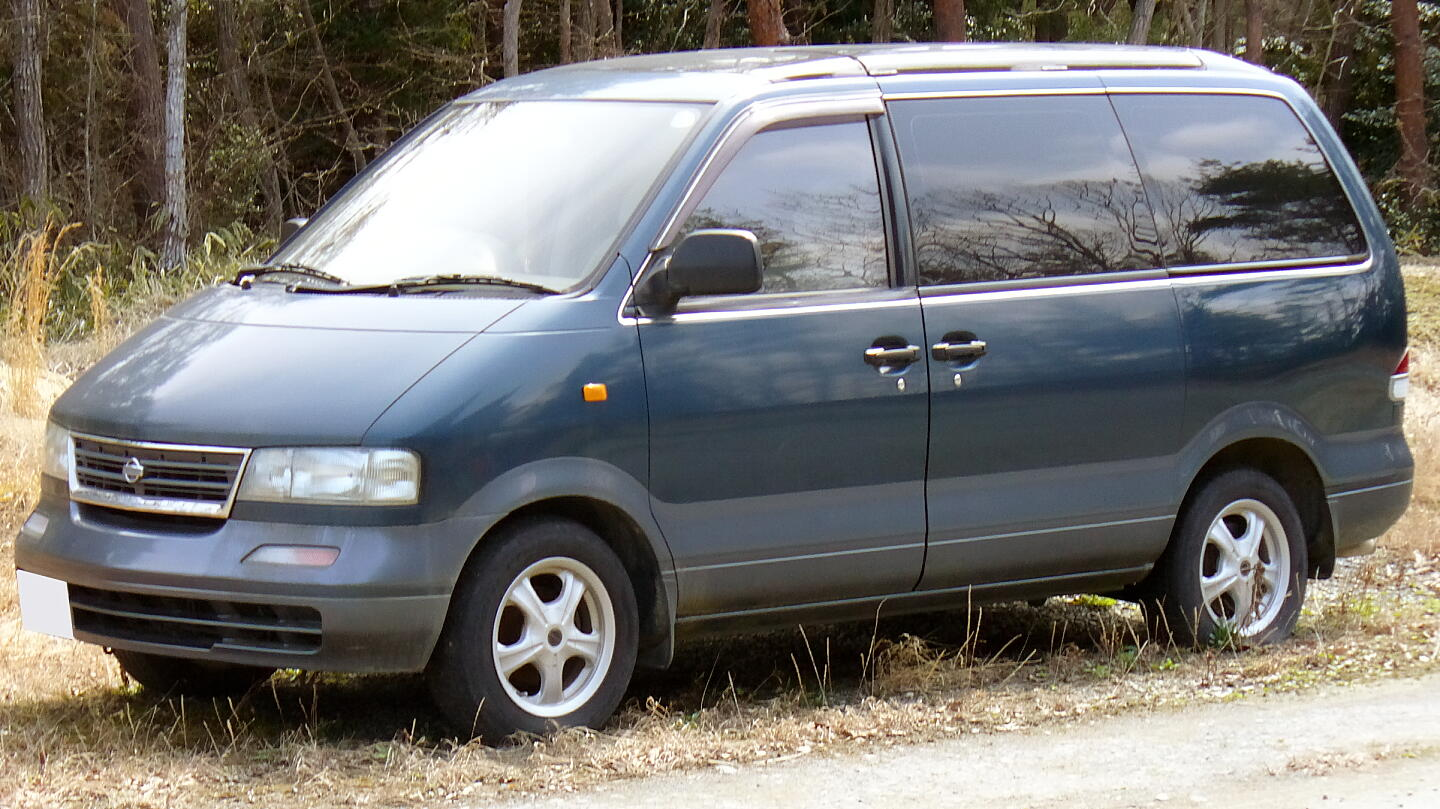
W30 Nissan Largo (pre-facelift)

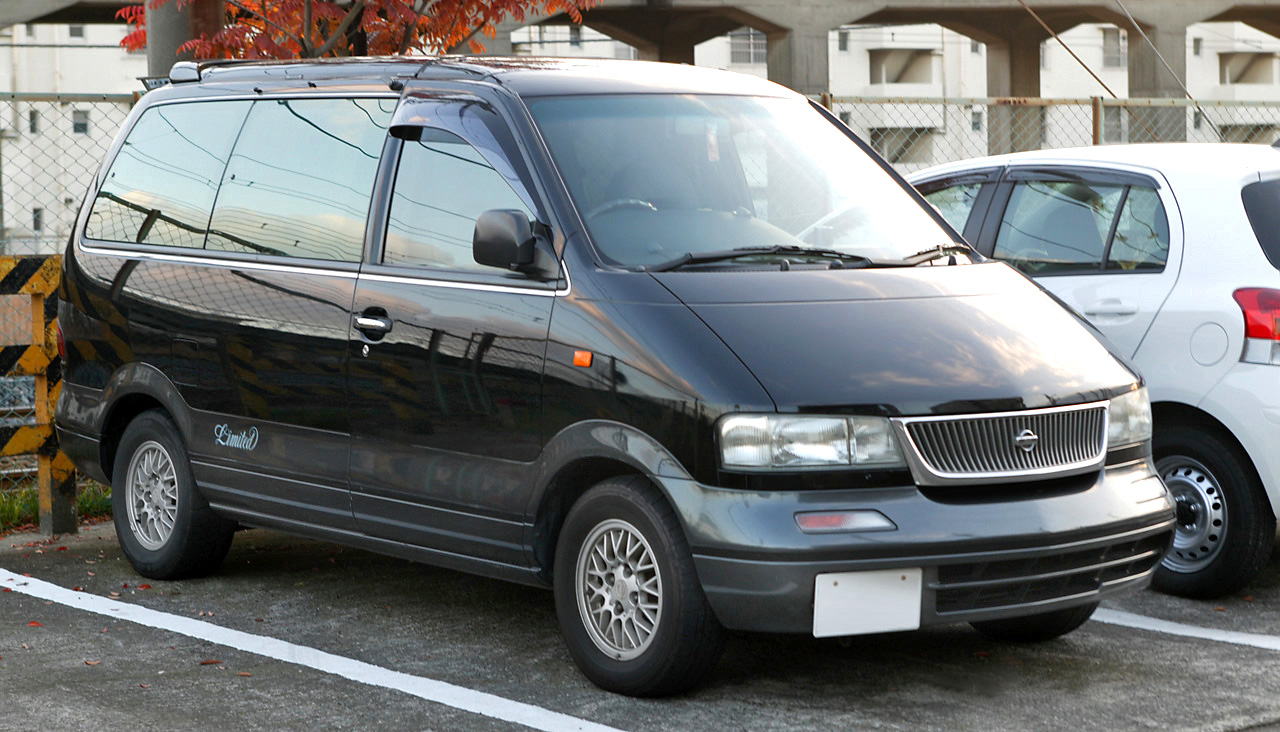
W30 Nissan Largo SX-G Plus (facelift)

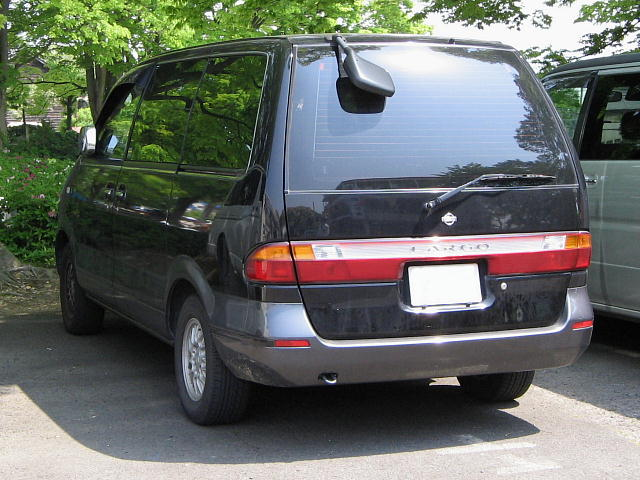
W30 Nissan Largo (facelift)

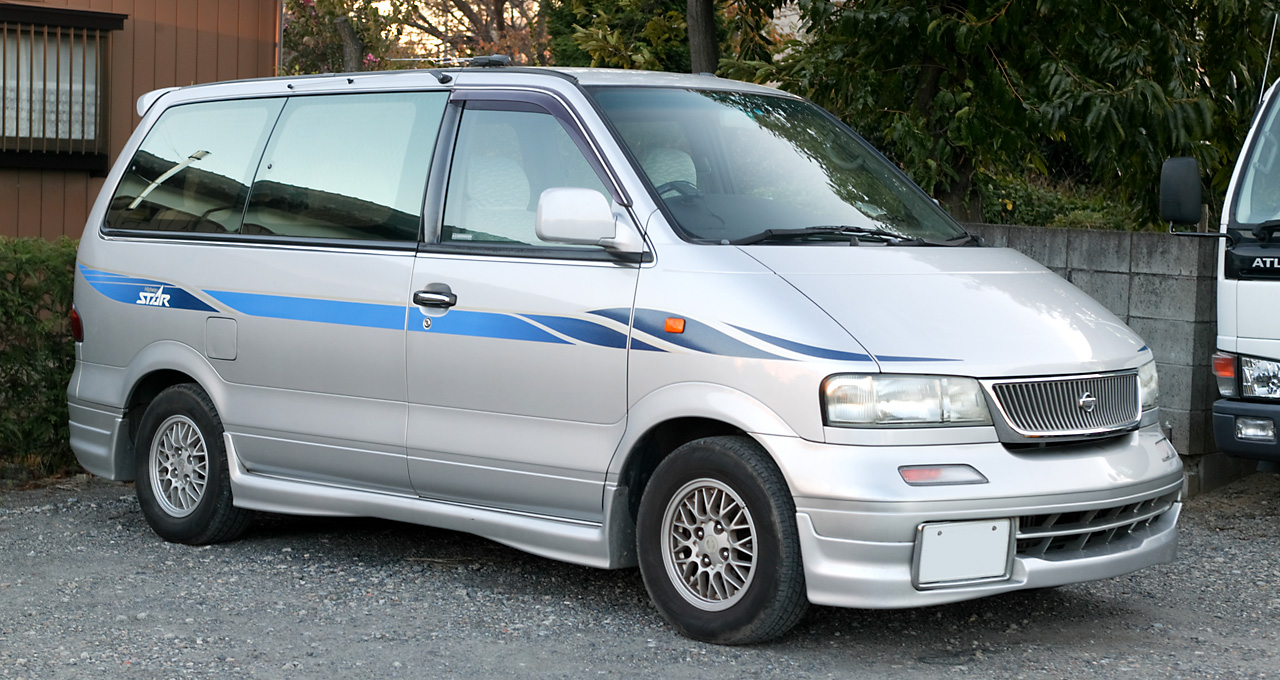
W30 Nissan Largo Highway Star (facelift)

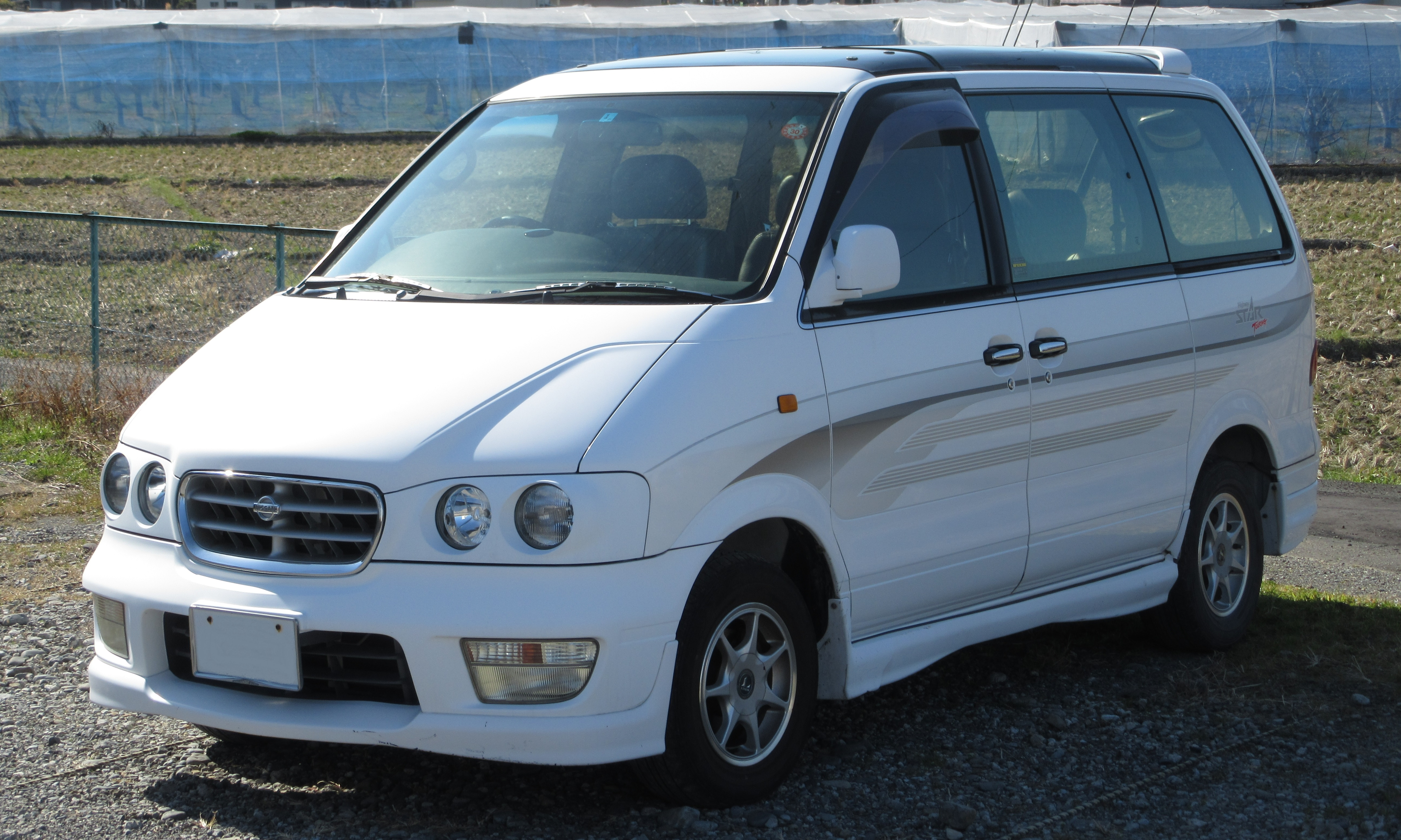
W30 Nissan Largo Highway Star Touring

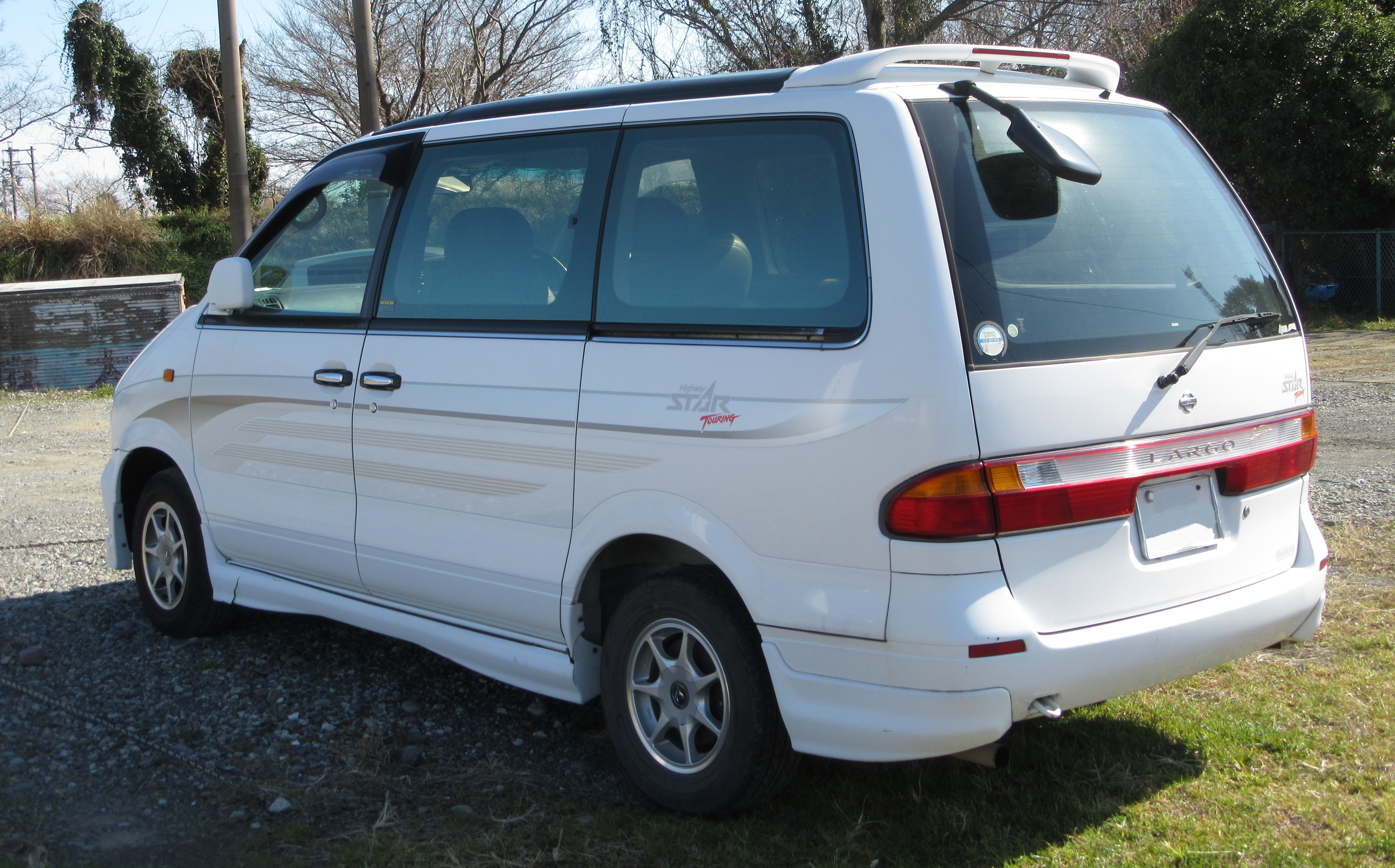
W30 Nissan Largo Highway Star Touring

== Second generation (C24; 1999) ==
Second generation
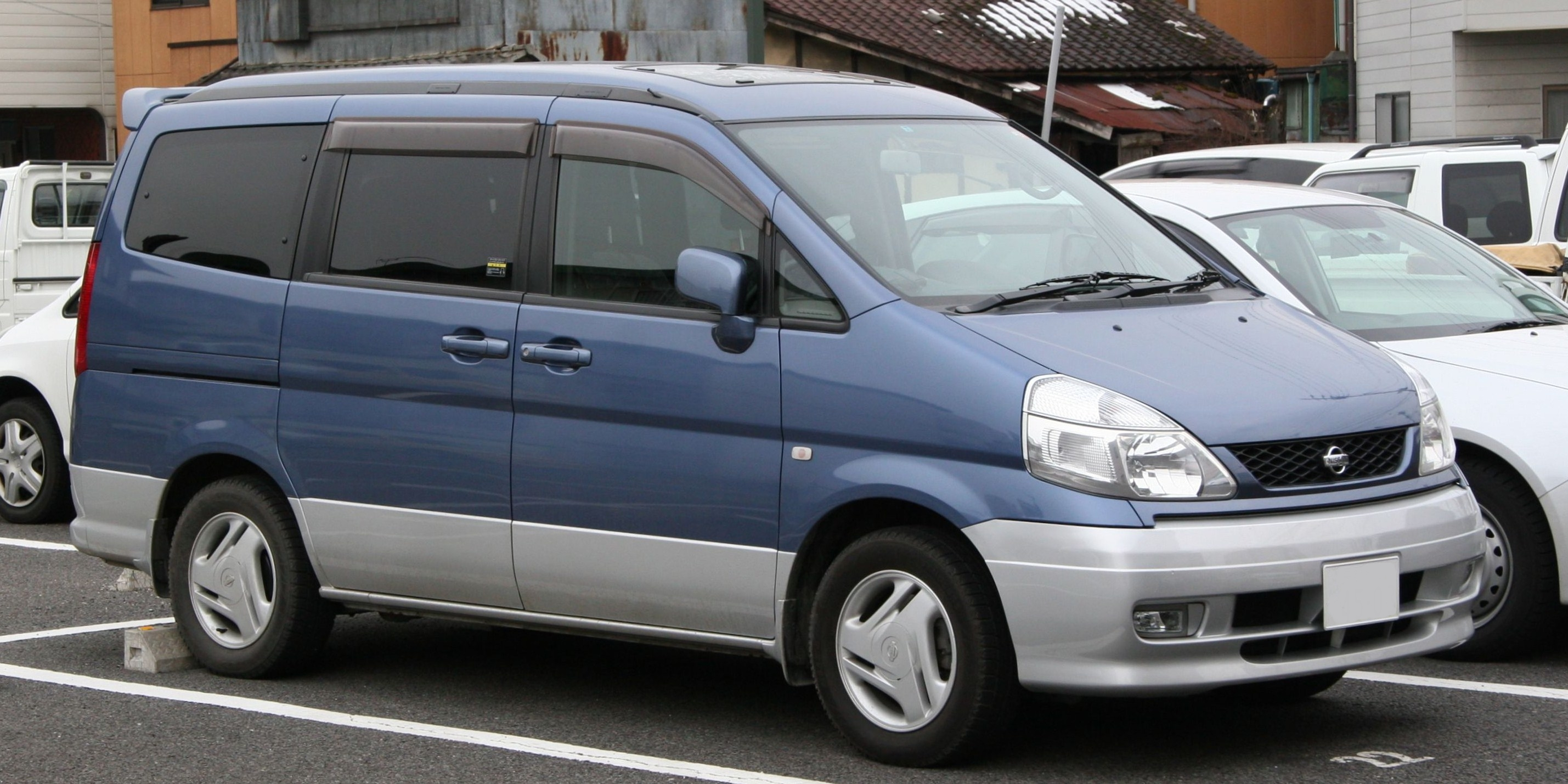
- Pre-facelift model (1999-2002)

Overview
- Model code: C24
- Also called: Dongfeng Yuxuan (China); Dongfeng Succe (China)
- Production: 1999–2005 (Japan); 2001–2012 (Taiwan); 2001–2012 (Malaysia, Philippines); 2004–2012 (Indonesia); 2007–2020 (China)
- Assembly: Japan: Yokosuka, Kanagawa (Oppama Plant); China: Zhengzhou, Henan (Zhengzhou Nissan); Indonesia: Purwakarta (Nissan Motor Indonesia); Malaysia: Kuala Lumpur (TCMA); Philippines: Manila (2002–2003); Santa Rosa City (2003–September 2012); Taiwan: Miaoli

Body and chassis
- Body style: 5-door minivan
- Layout: Front-engine, front-wheel-drive Front-engine, four-wheel-drive
- Platform: Nissan MS platform
- Related: Dongfeng Yumsun; ZNA Succe

Powertrain
- Engine: 1.5 L 4A15 I4; 2.0 L SR20DE I4; 2.0 L QR20DE I4; 2.5 L YD25DDTi I4; 2.5 L QR25DE I4
- Transmission: 5-speed manual; Hyper CVT; 4-speed automatic

Dimensions
- Wheelbase: 2,695 mm (106.1 in)
- Length: 4,590 mm (180.7 in); 4,731 mm (186.3 in) (Taiwan)
- Width: 1,695 mm (66.7 in)
- Height: 1,825 mm (71.9 in)
- Curb weight: 1,580 kg (3,483 lb)

The second-generation Serena was launched in Japan in June 1999, ditched the rear-wheel drive layout in favour of front-wheel drive construction. These versions had a facelift with a wider variety of engines and colours. From December 2001 onwards (the time of the facelift) the Serena used the QR20DE and QR25DE. The pre-facelift C24 Serenas all have a 2.0 L engine, with the optional 2.5 L engine becoming available from 2002. With the partnership between Nissan and Renault having been implemented, Nissan MPVs were withdrawn from Europe where Renault products, like the Renault Espace and Renault Scénic were sold and better accepted.

Facelifted model was released in December 2001. The rear design of the standard roof model underwent significant changes, with the addition of a tailgate lining, larger rear combination lamps, and aluminum vapor-cooling, resulting in a robust and powerful design. Remote-controlled automatic sliding doors were added to the existing sliding doors on both sides, improving comfort. Starting with this latest model, the logo was changed to the design used since 2001, the model name logo was changed to NE-01, and the rear model name emblem was moved from the top of the garnish to the left. The license plate was also moved from the center of the tailgate to the inside of the lower garnish.

Indonesian-market cars use the 2.0 L QR20DE inline-four petrol engine. The trims available in Indonesia are Comfort Touring, Highway Star, and Autech. The Comfort Touring trim-level does not come equipped with electric sliding door and reverse camera, while the Highway Star and the Autech do. The C24 Serena was also manufactured by Edaran Tan Chong Motor Sdn Bhd in Kuala Lumpur, Malaysia.

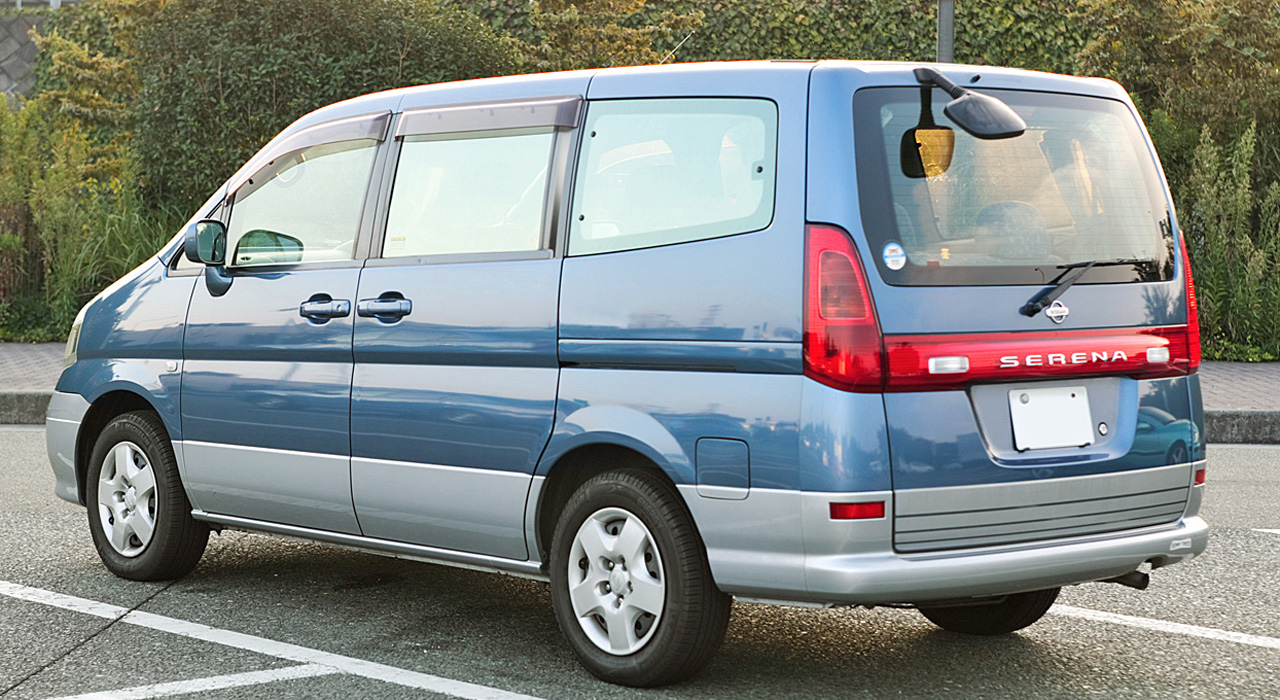
Japanese-market Serena pre-facelift rear

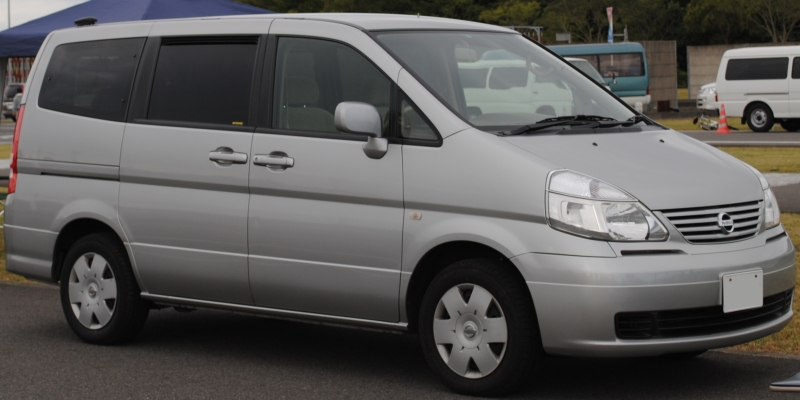
Japanese-market Serena post-facelift

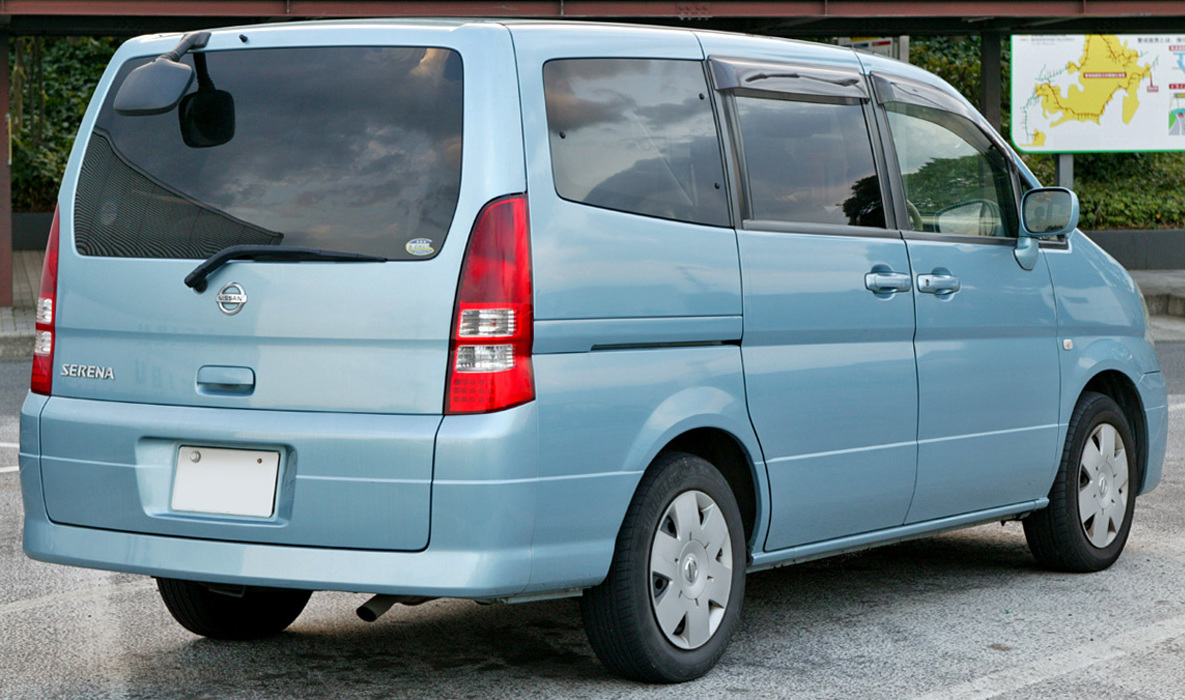
Japanese-market Serena post-facelift rear

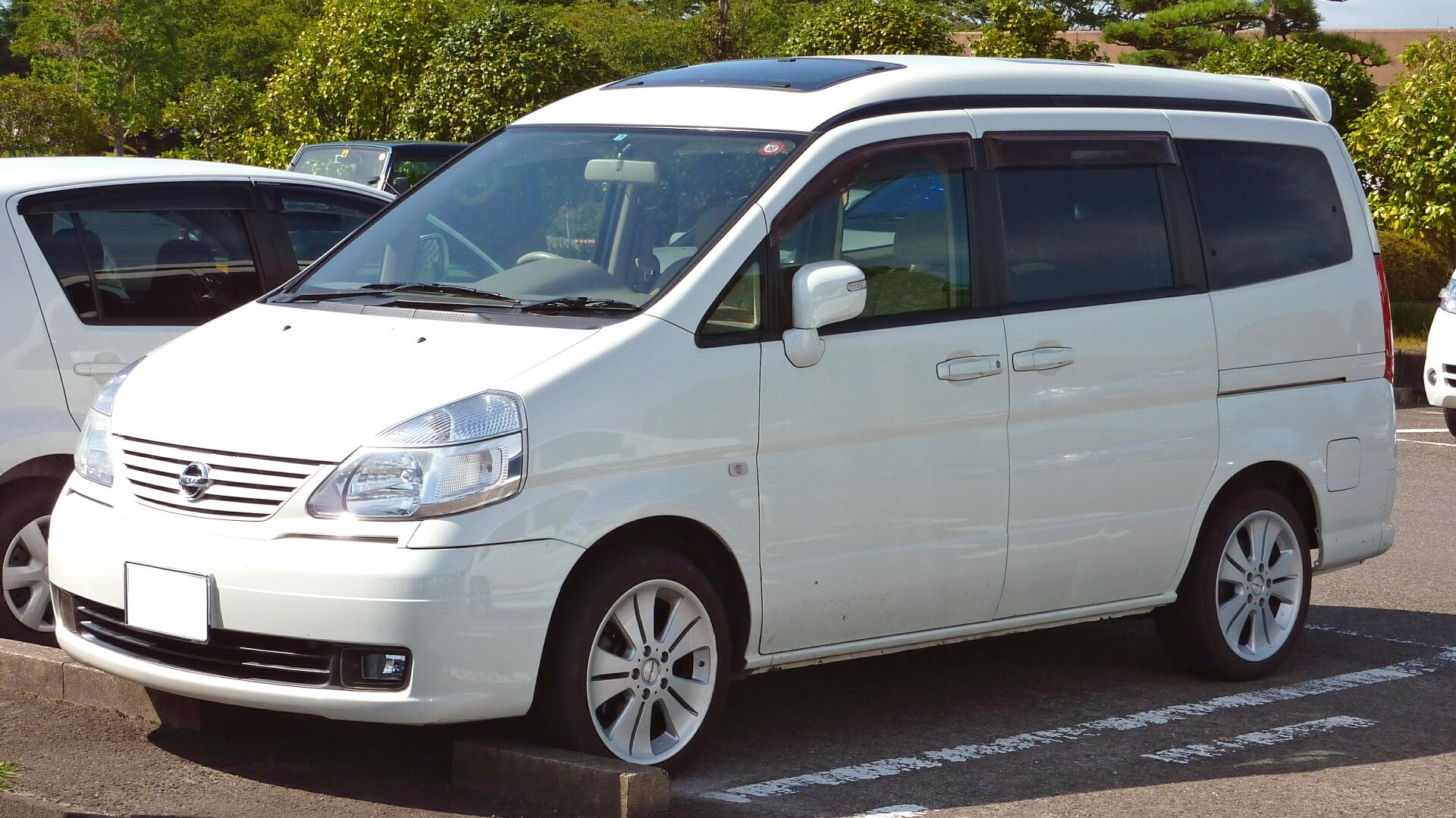
Japanese-market Serena High Roof post-facelift rear

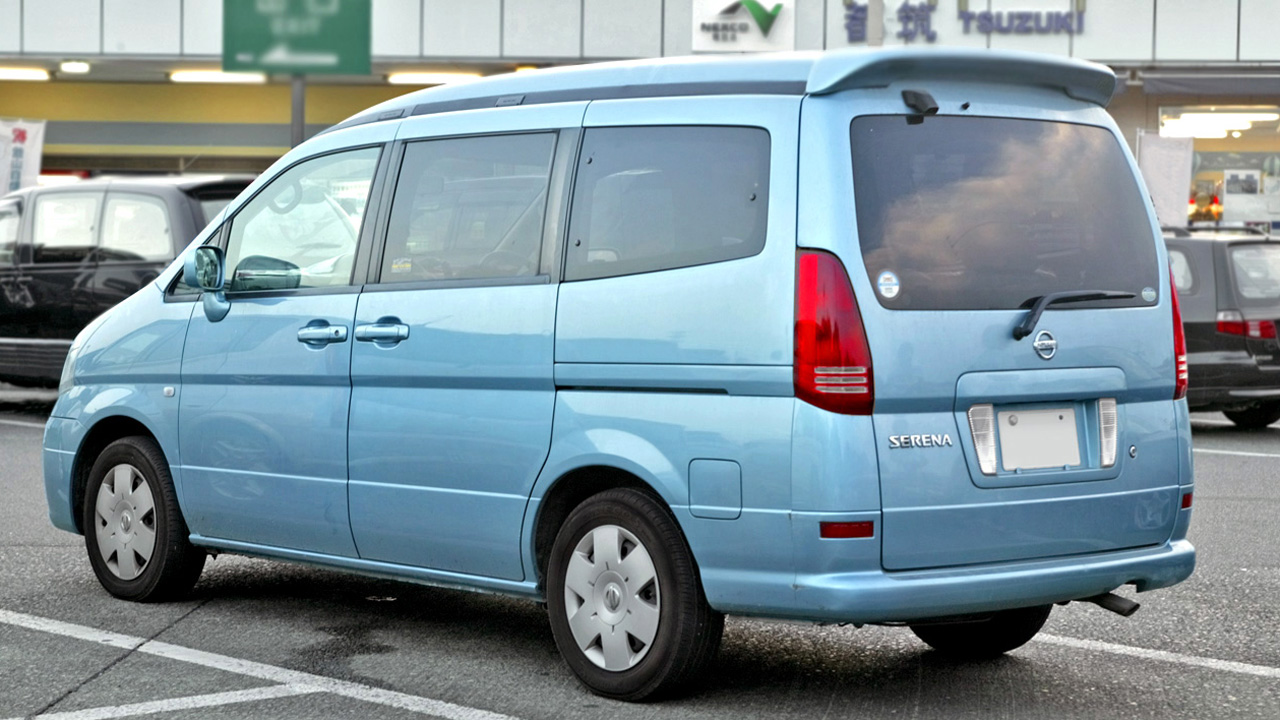
Japanese-market Serena High Roof post-facelift rear

Serena Highway Star

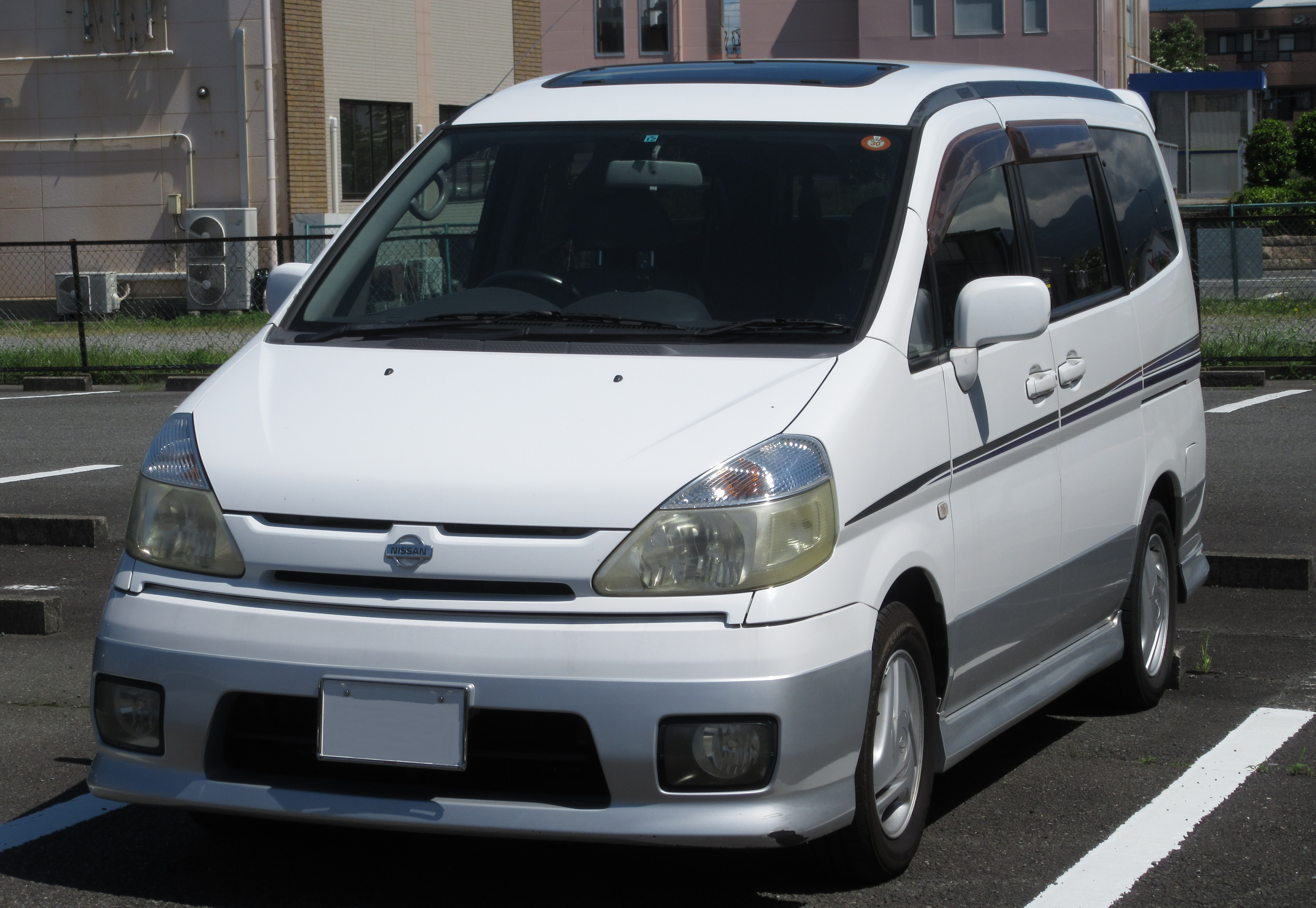
Japanese-market Serena Highway Star pre-facelift

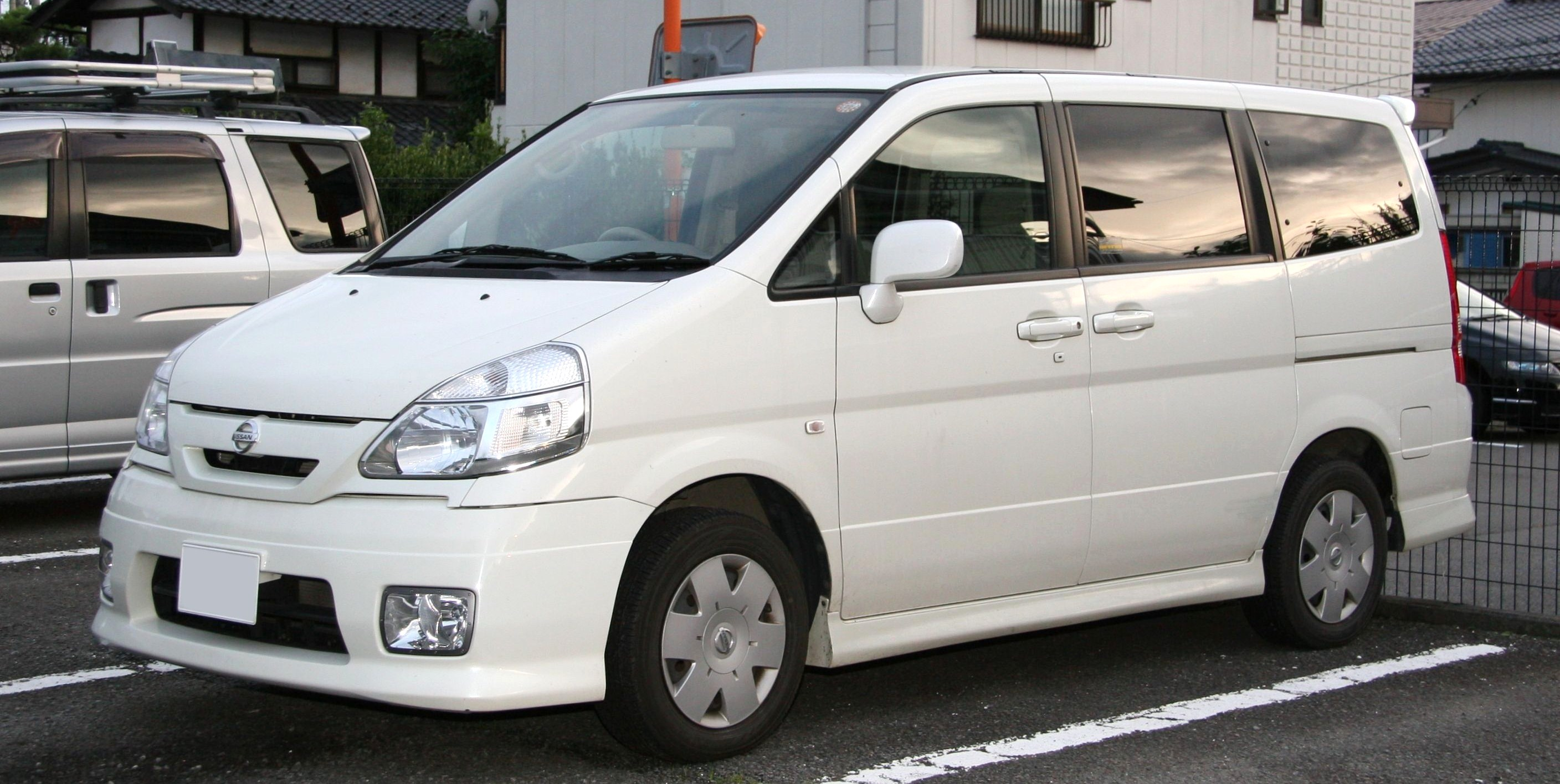
Japanese-market Serena Highway Star post-facelift

Serena Rider

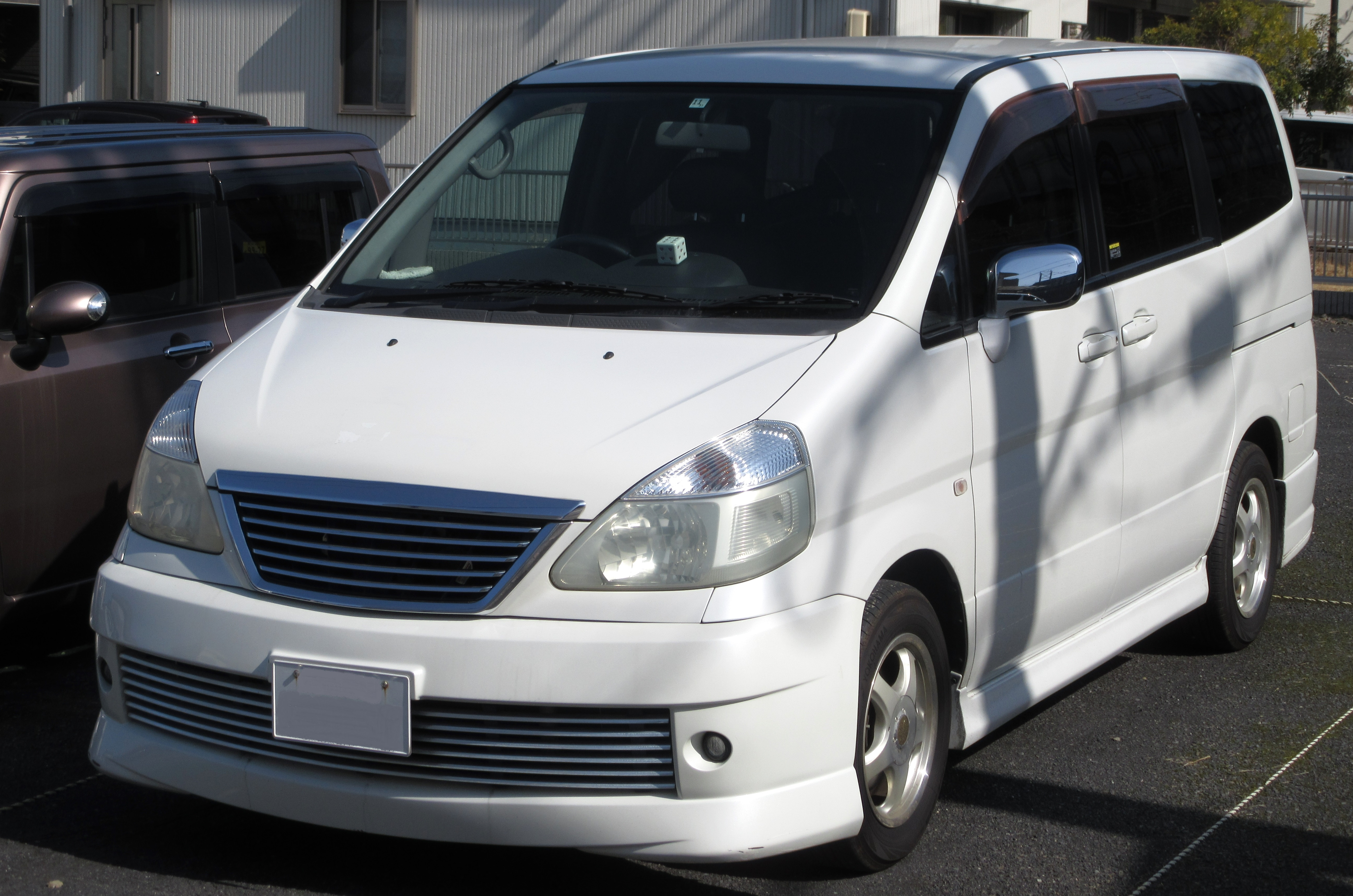
Japanese-market Serena Rider pre-facelift

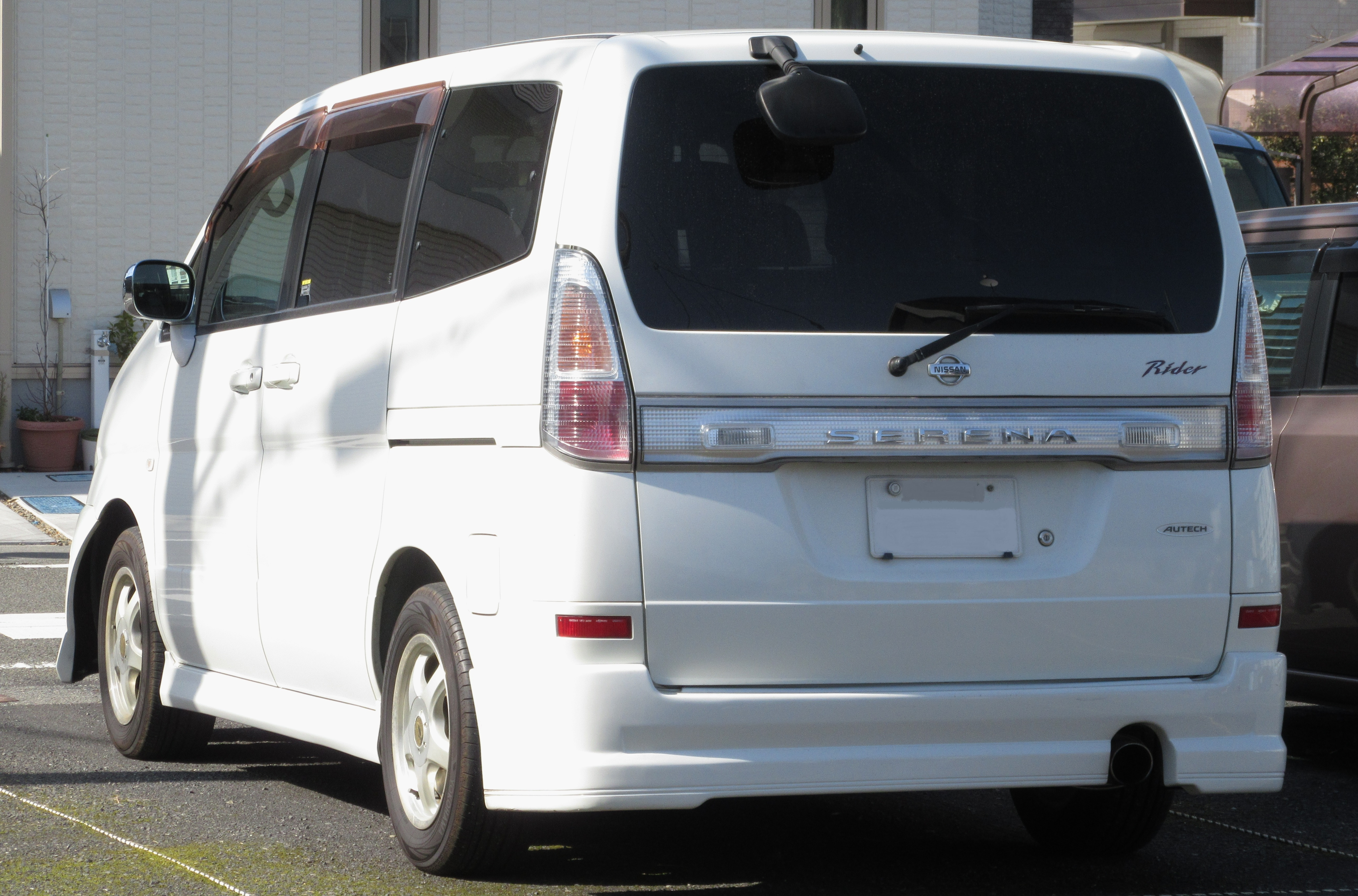
Japanese-market Serena Rider pre-facelift rear

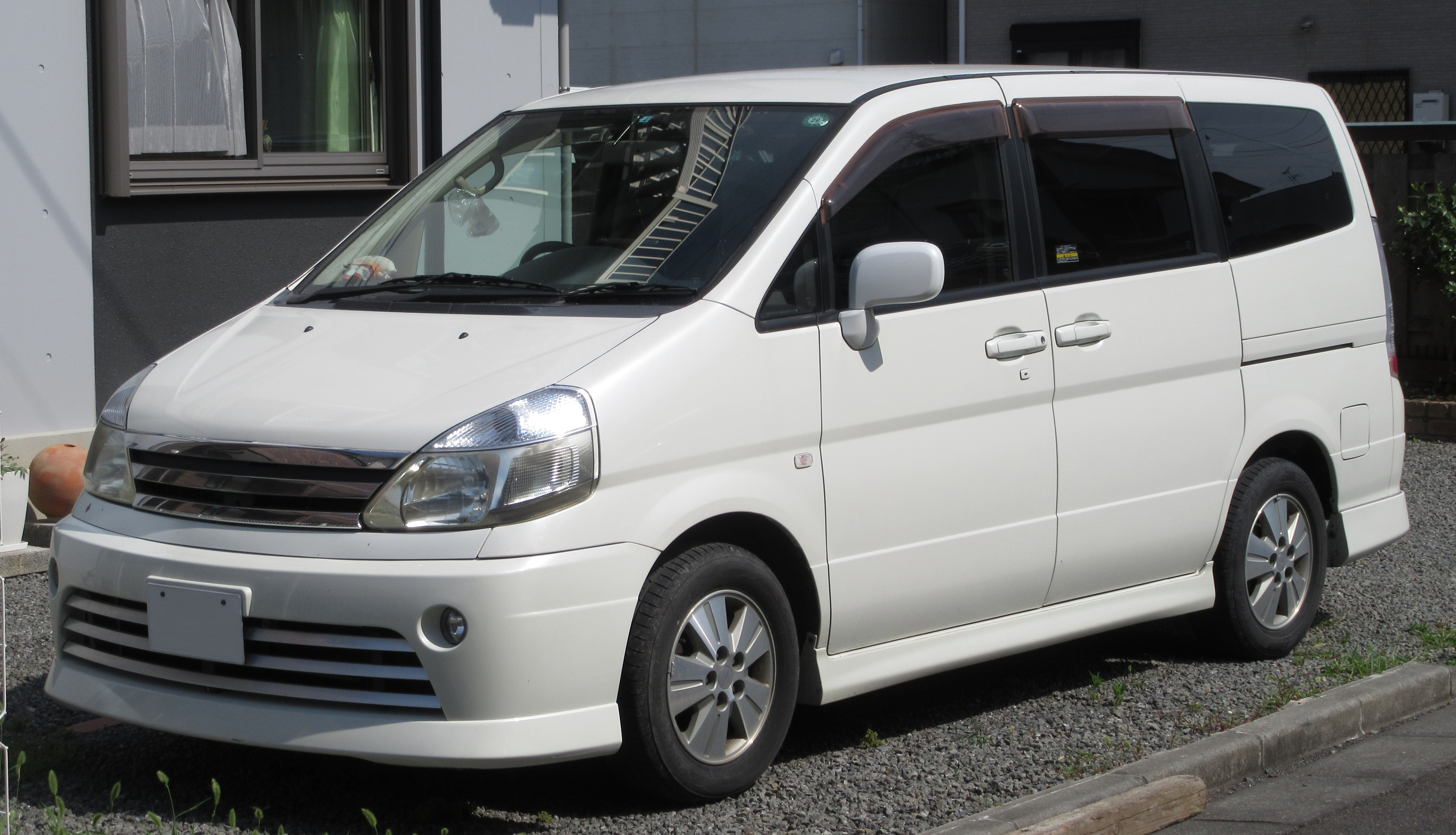
Japanese-market Serena Rider post-facelift

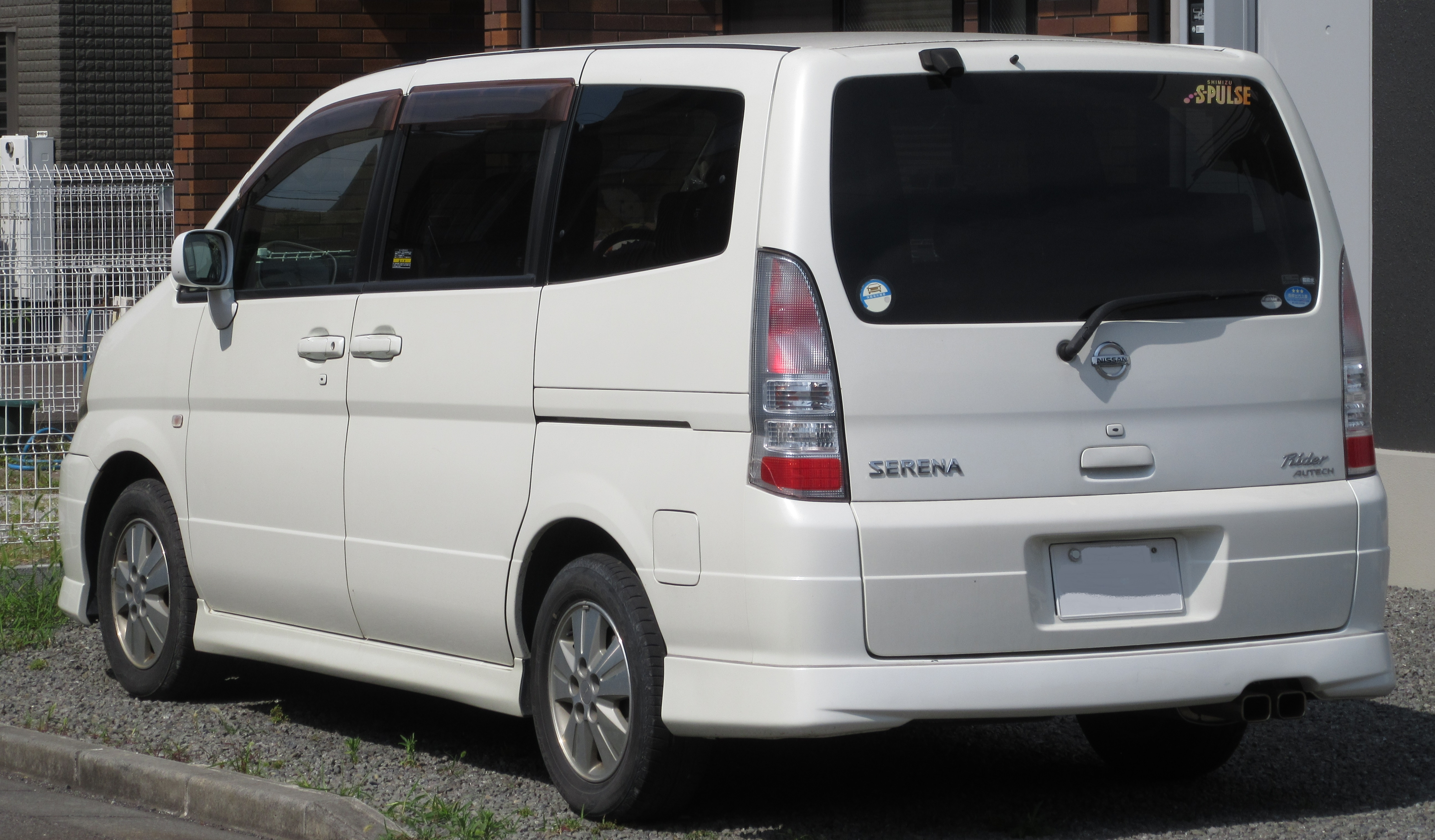
Japanese-market Serena Rider post-facelift rear

=== Taiwanese version ===
In Taiwan, a lengthened version of the Serena C24 has been manufactured by Yulon under the Nissan label. The Taiwanese Serena is 141 mm (5.6 in) longer than the original, all behind the C-pillar. The Taiwanese version was in production until 2012 and following the 2006 facelift was only available with the 160 PS (118 kW) 2.5-litre QR25DE engine joined to a 5-speed manual or 4-speed automatic.

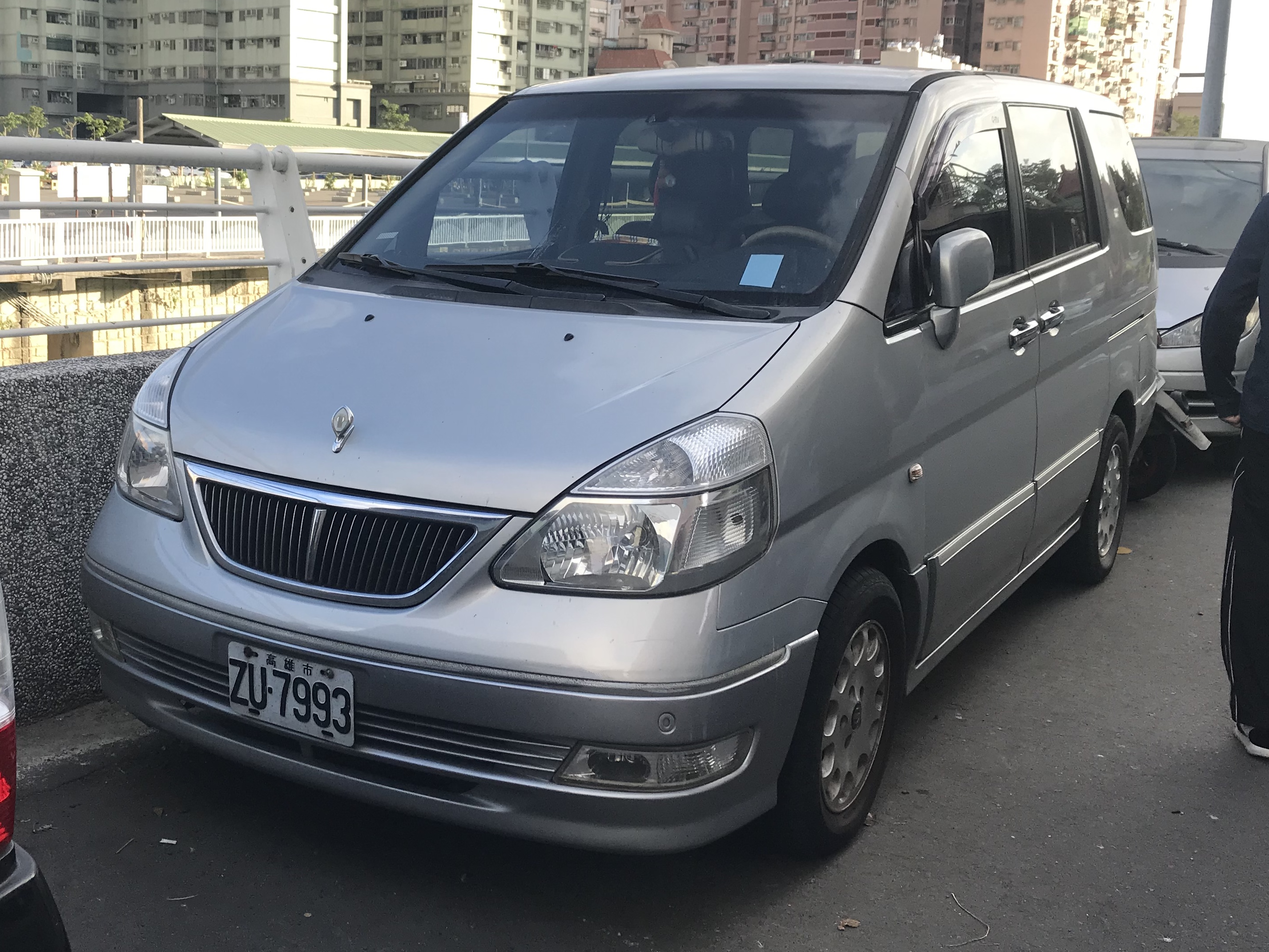
Taiwanese-market Serena pre-facelift

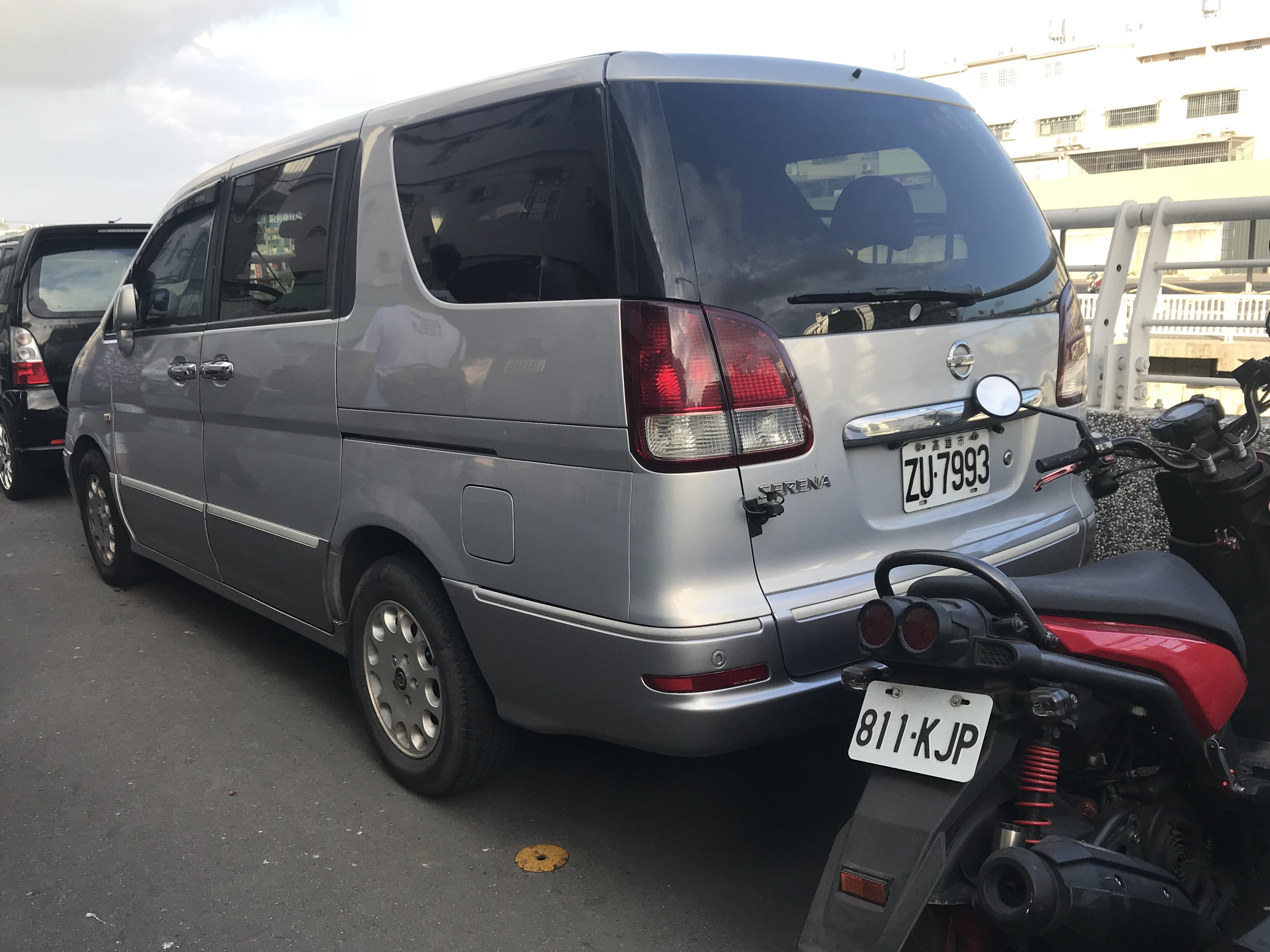
Taiwanese-market Serena pre-facelift

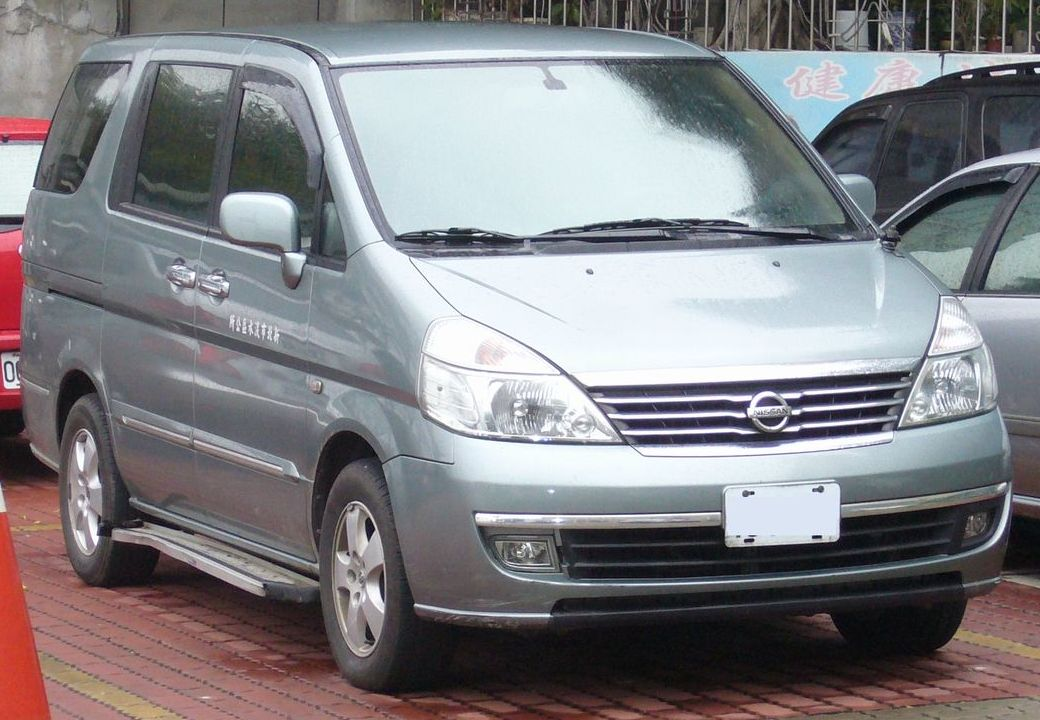
Taiwanese-market Serena post-facelift

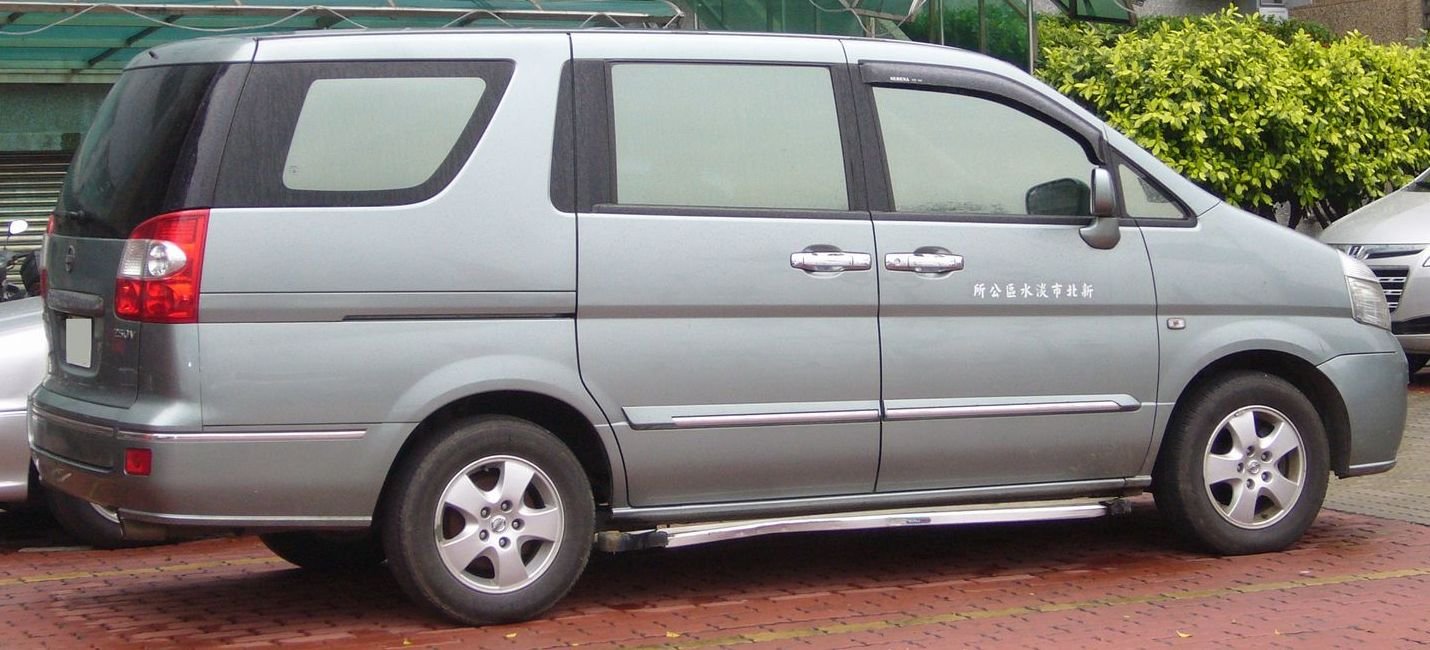
Taiwanese-market Serena post-facelift

=== Chinese version ===
In the People's Republic of China, the Serena Mk. II was sold by Zhengzhou Nissan Automobile in the form of the Taiwanese Yulon version while being rebadged to Yuxuan or Yumsun under the Dongfeng brand.

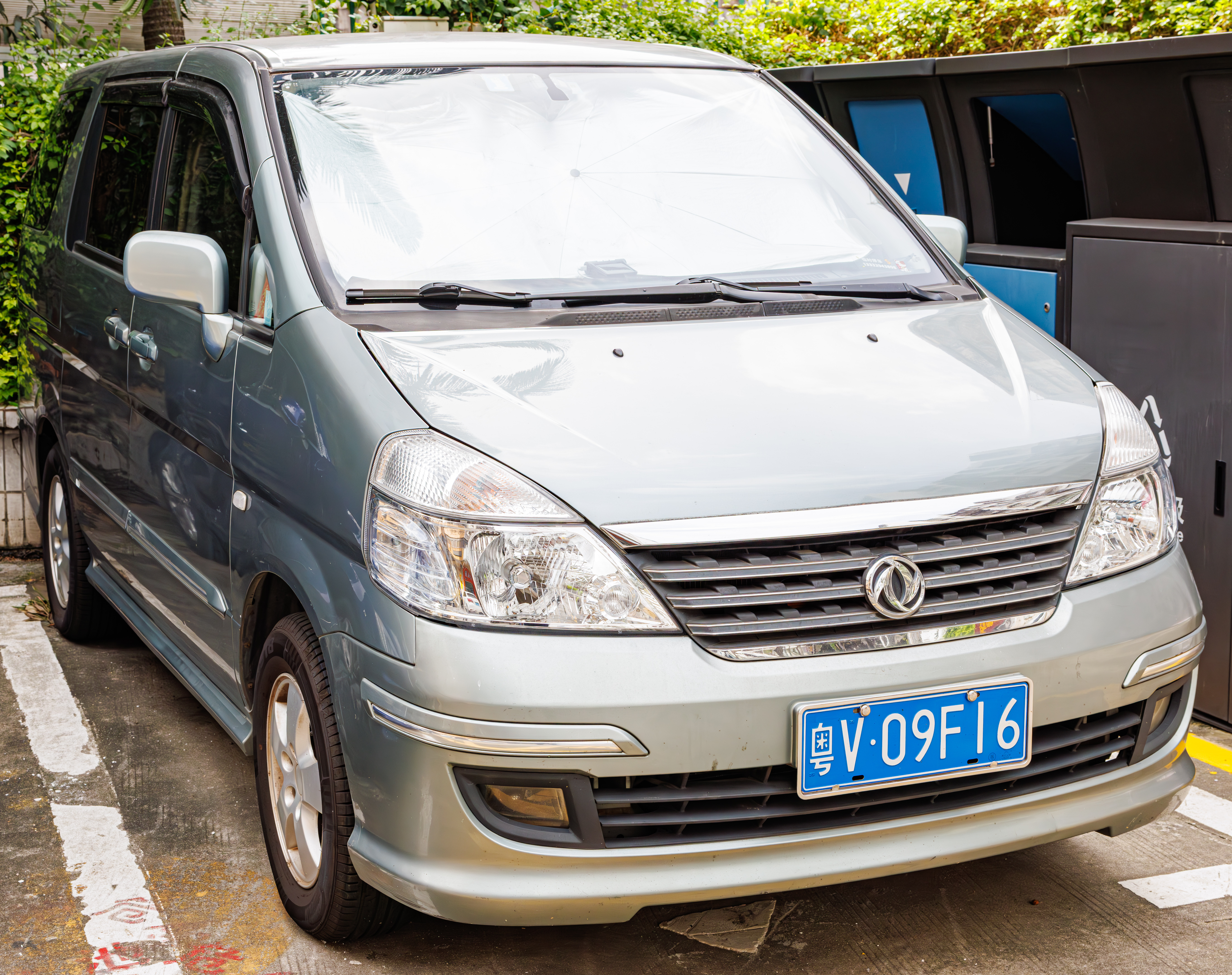
Dongfeng Yuxuan (Yumsun)

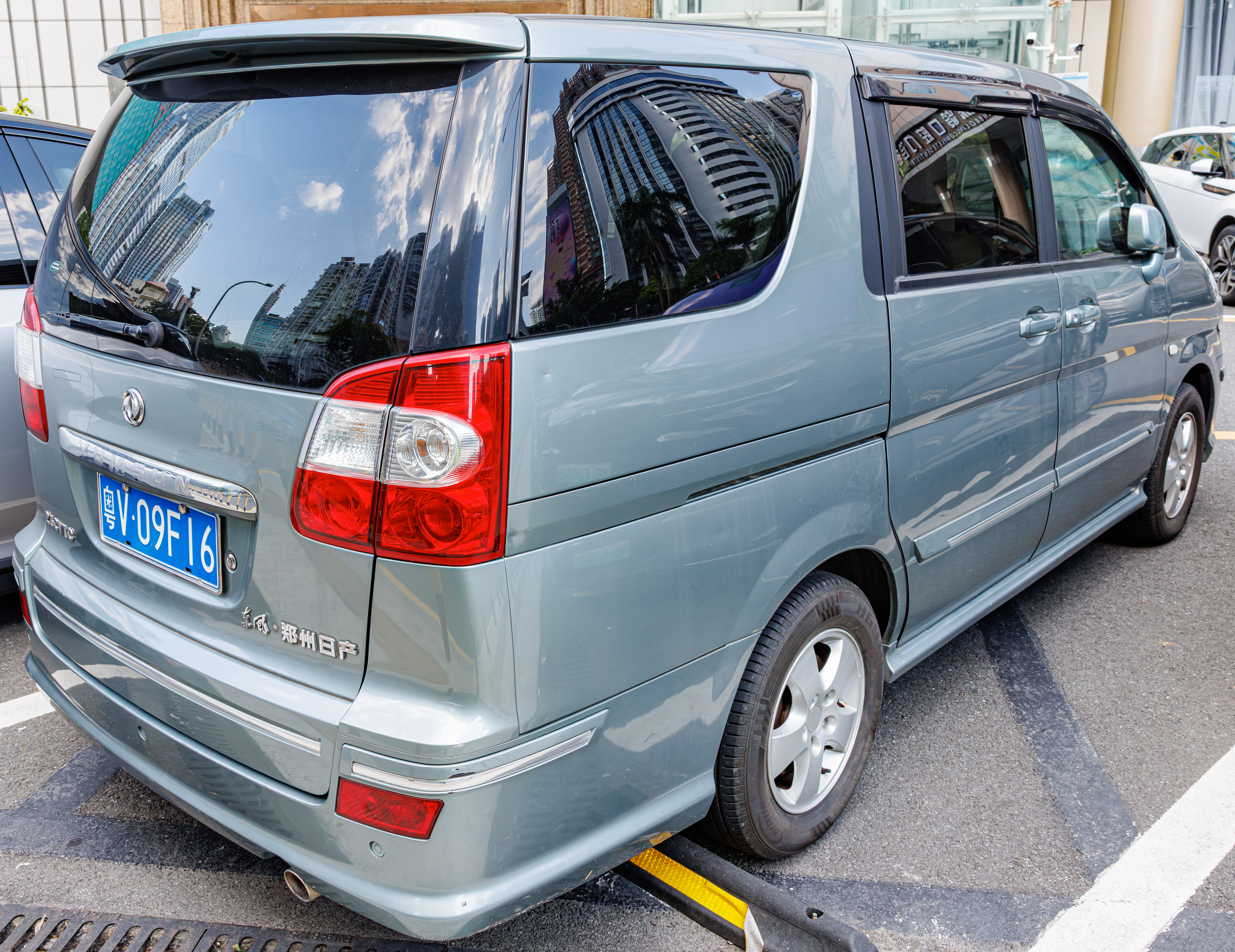
Dongfeng Yuxuan rear

Another restyled, rebadged, and renamed version called the Dongfeng Succe and is also produced by their subsidiary Zhengzhou Nissan Automobile.

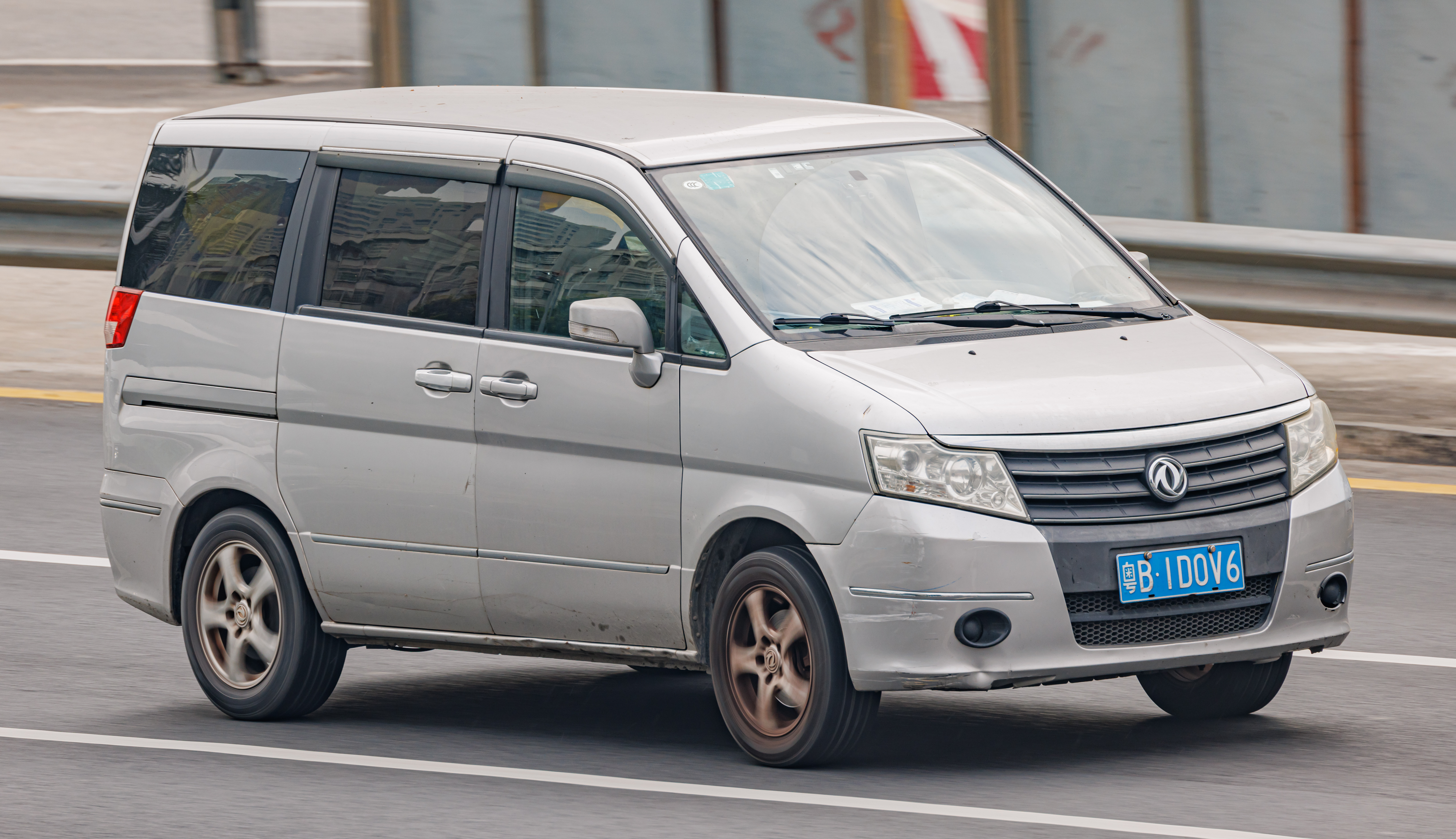
Dongfeng Succe pre-facelift

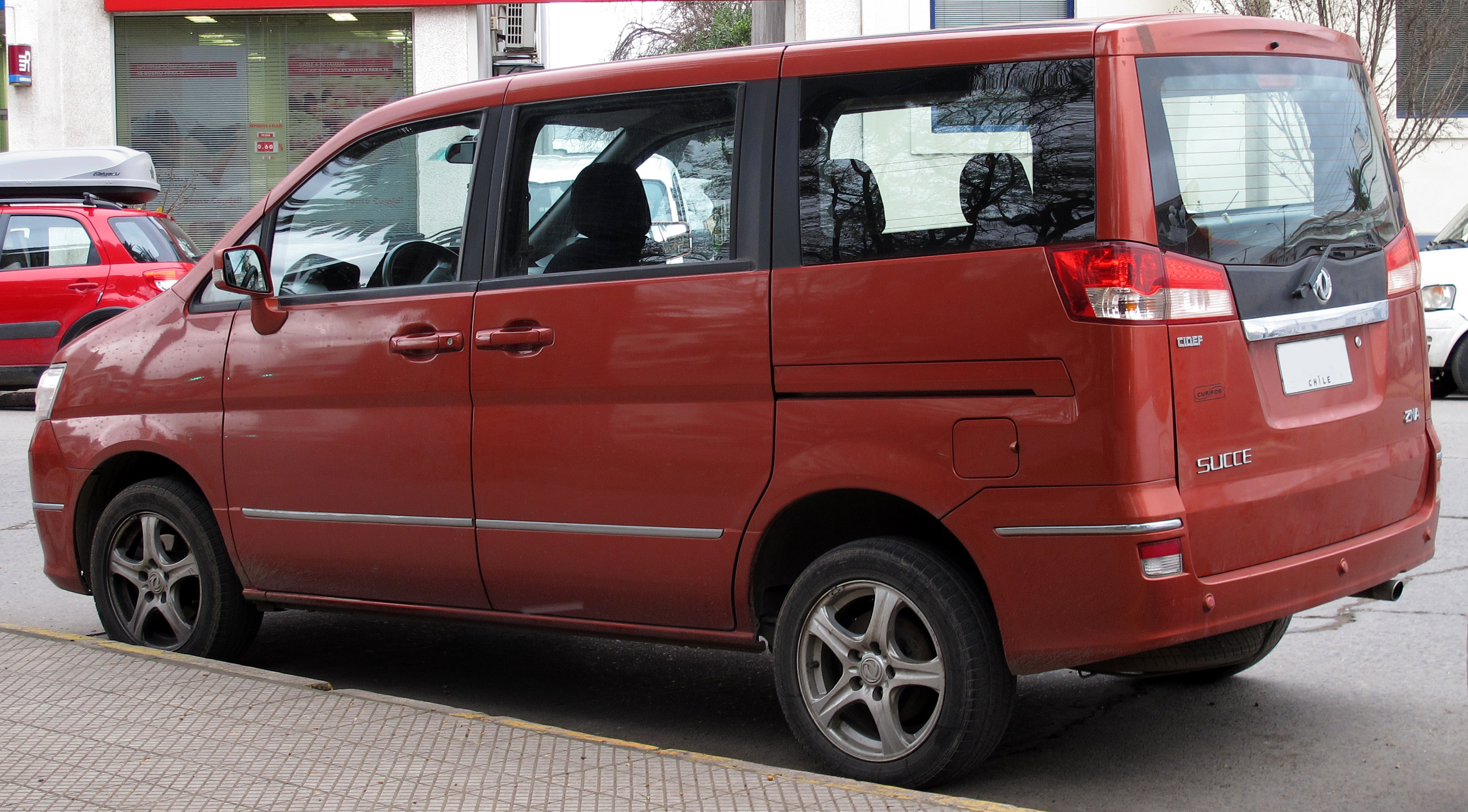
2012 Dongfeng ZNA Succe 1.6 pre-facelift

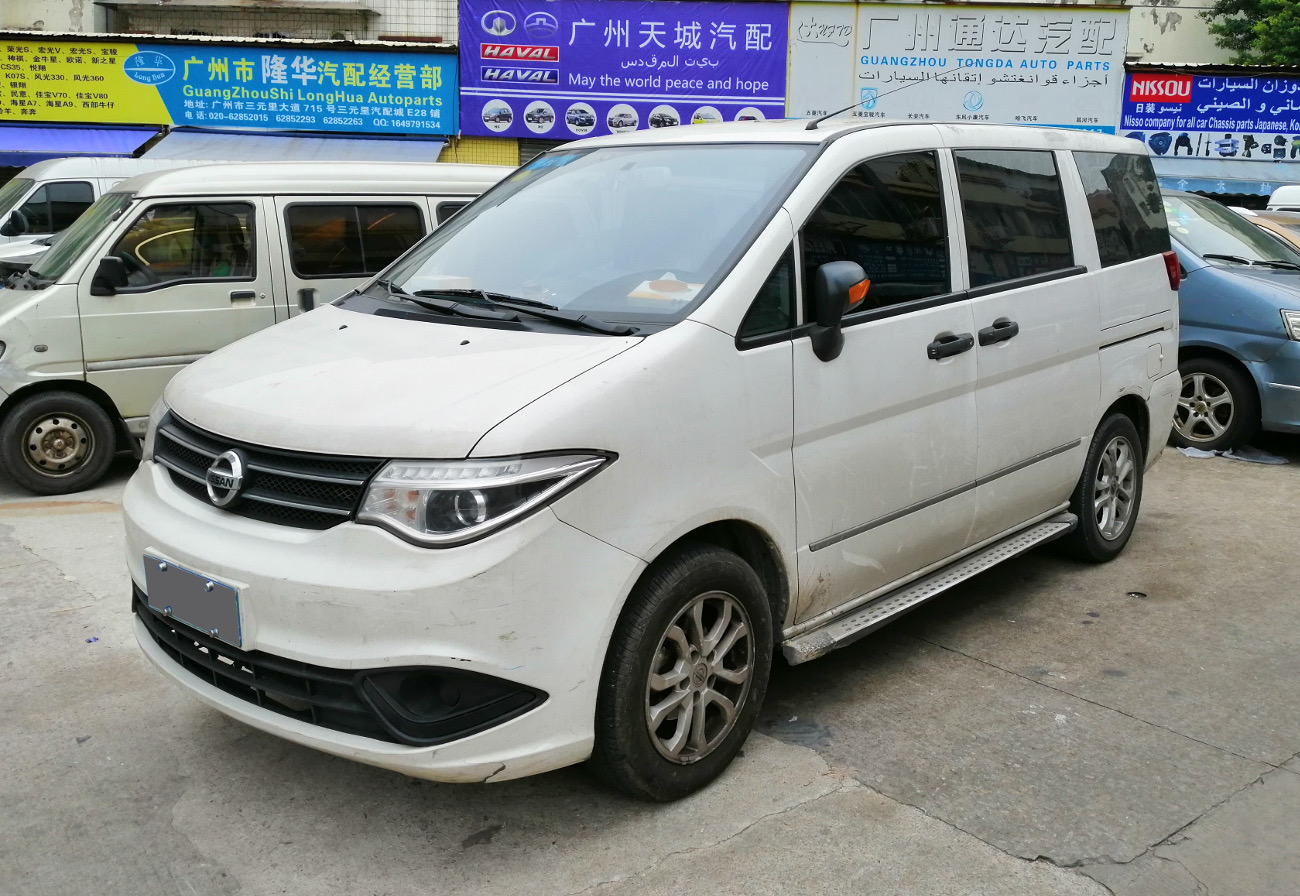
Chinese-market Dongfeng Succe post-facelift

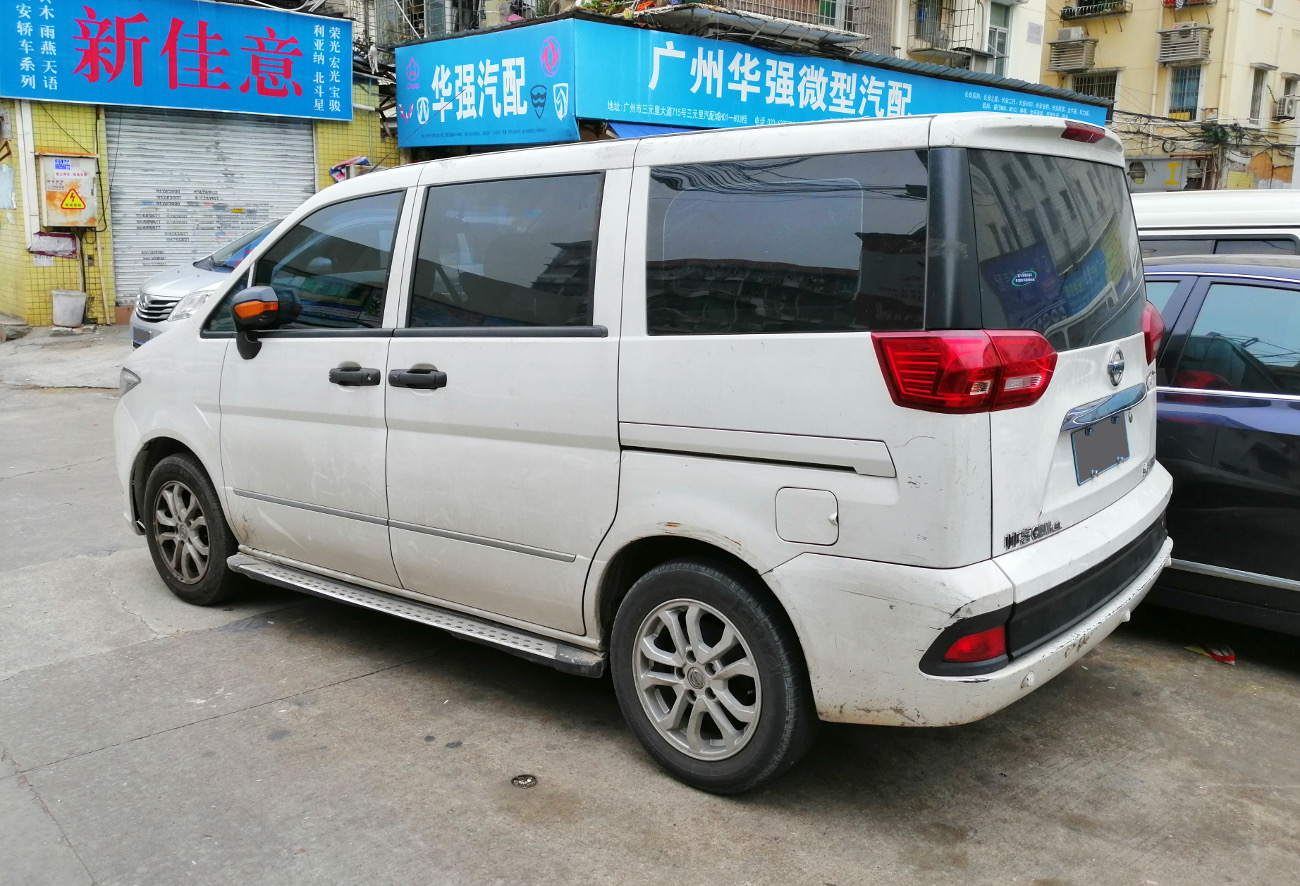
Chinese-market Dongfeng Succe post-facelift

== Third generation (C25; 2005) ==
Third generation
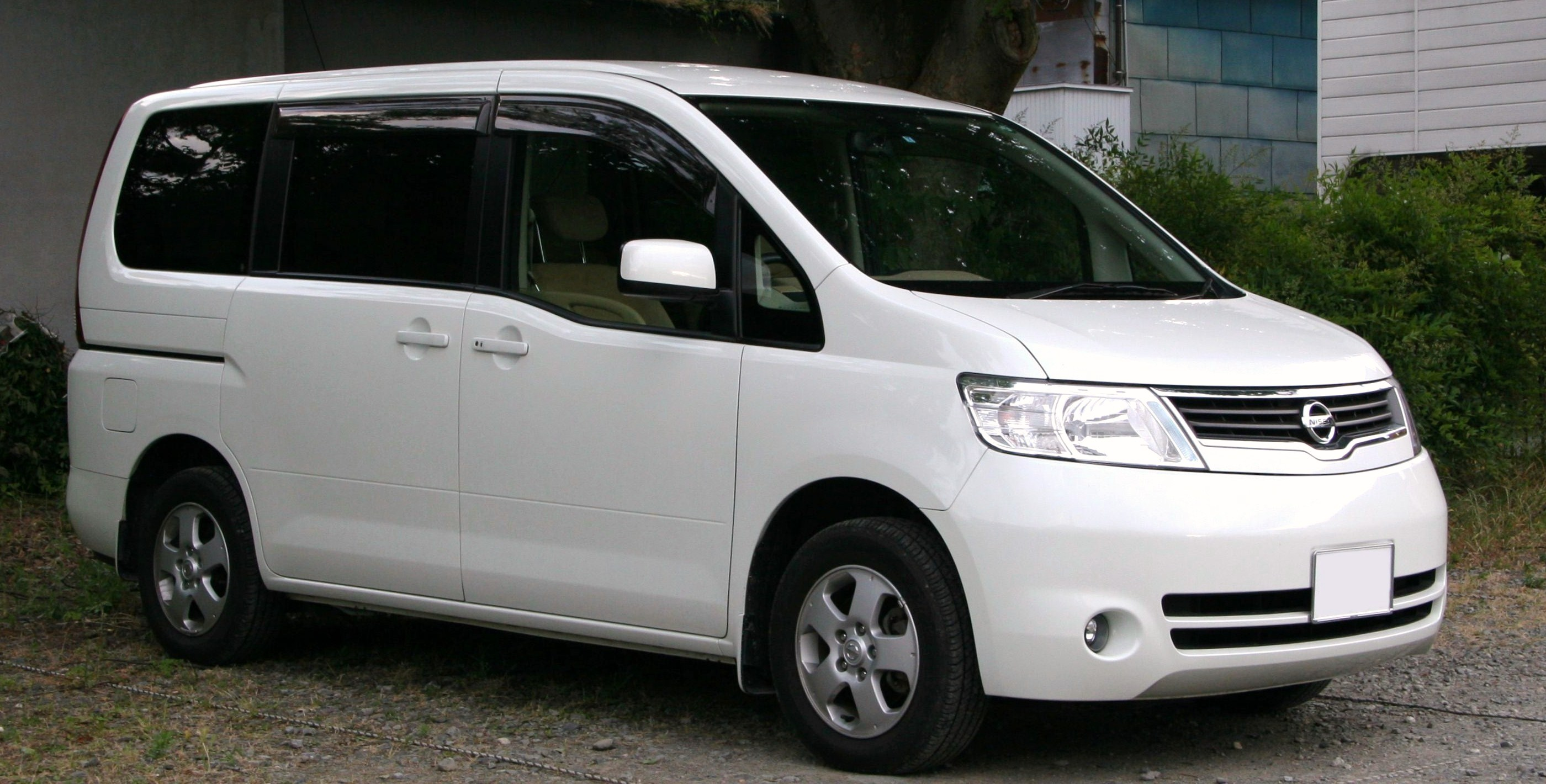

Overview
- Model code: C25
- Also called: Suzuki Landy
- Production: 2005–2010
- Assembly: Japan: Hiratsuka, Kanagawa (Nissan Shatai)

Body and chassis
- Body style: 5-door minivan
- Layout: Front-engine, front-wheel-drive Front-engine, four-wheel-drive

Powertrain
- Engine: 2.0 L MR20DE DI I4
- Transmission: Xtronic CVT

Dimensions
- Wheelbase: 2,860 mm (112.6 in)
- Length: 4,650–4,725 mm (183.1–186.0 in)
- Width: 1,695–1,725 mm (66.7–67.9 in)
- Height: 1,840–1,850 mm (72.4–72.8 in)
- Curb weight: 1,610–1,700 kg (3,549–3,748 lb)

The third generation debuted in Japan in May 2005. This model was officially sold in Japan and Hong Kong, and also sold through parallel imports in Singapore, Indonesia and Brunei.

In 2007, 2008 and 2009, the Serena C25 was the best selling minivan in Japan.

In Japan, Nissan started supplying OEM products to Suzuki under the name Suzuki Landy in 2007. Overall it is the same as the original, but the only changes are the front grille, and the emblem. A practice that is continued with the fourth and fifth generation Serena.

The third generation was discontinued in Japan in late 2010 and in Hong Kong in 2011.

=== Gallery ===
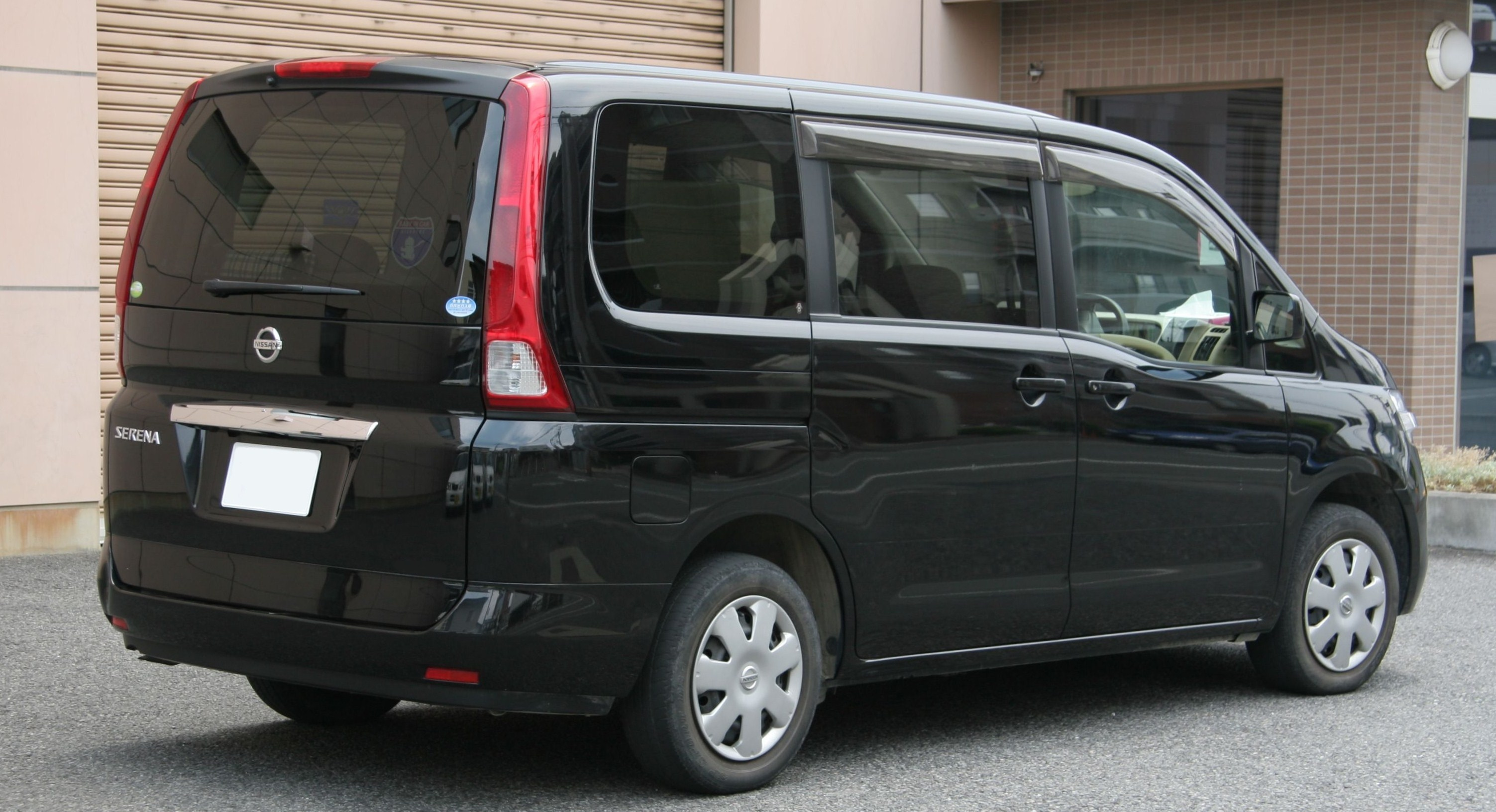
Nissan Serena C25 pre-facelift rear

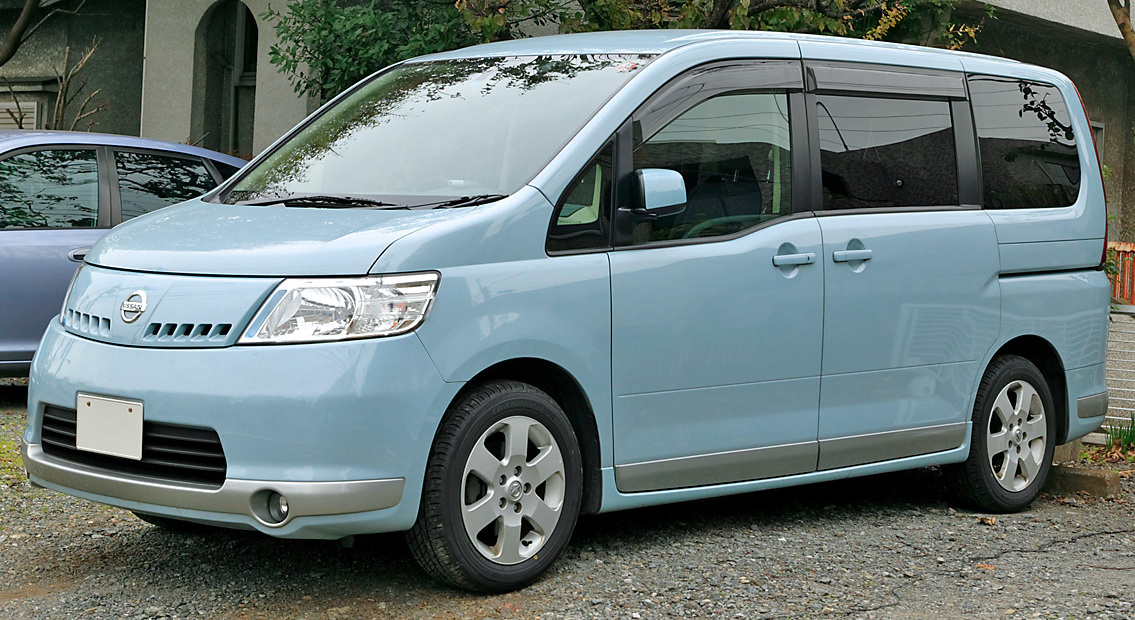
Nissan Serena C25 20RS/RX pre-facelift

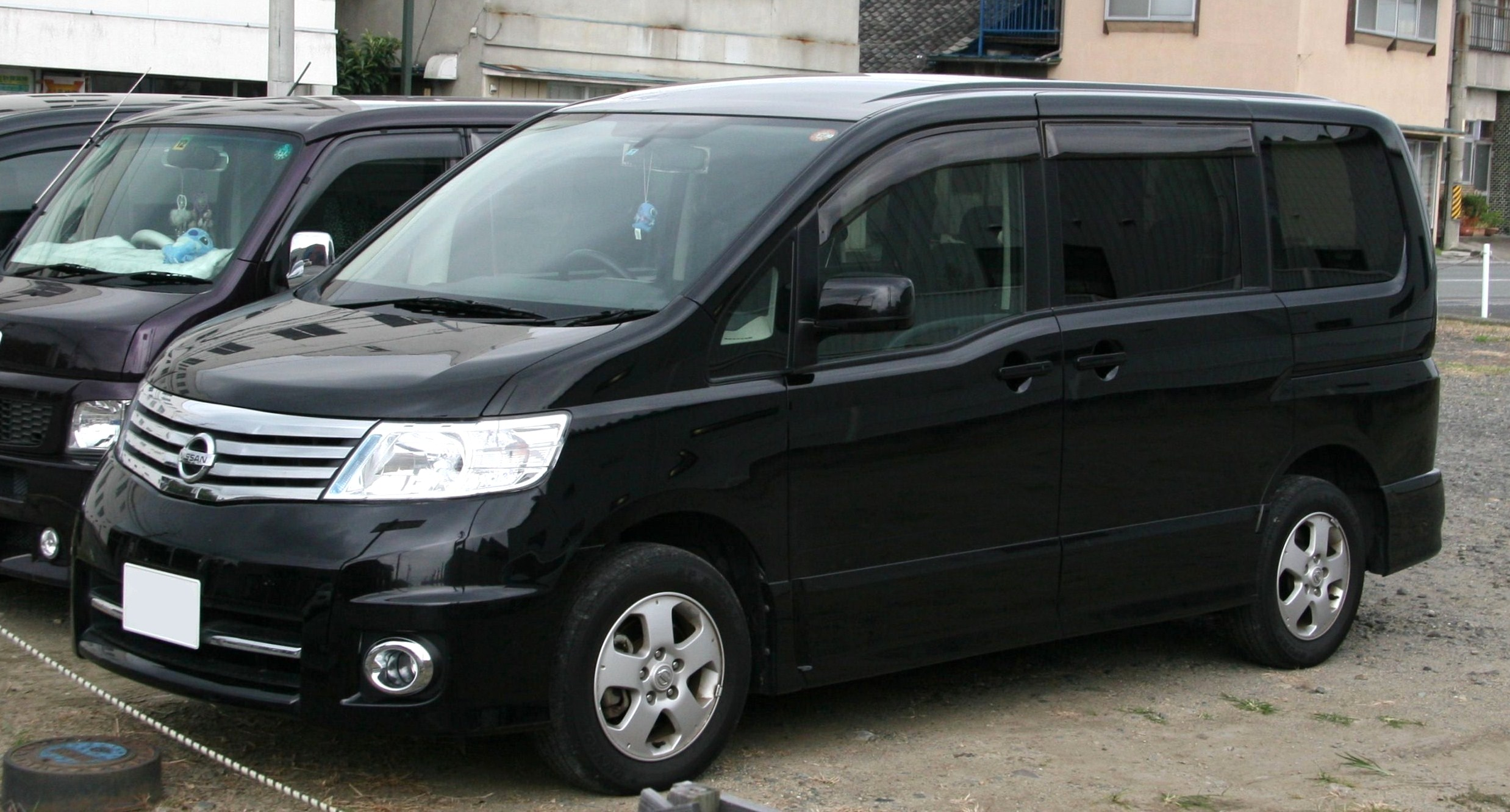
Nissan Serena C25 Highway Star pre-facelift

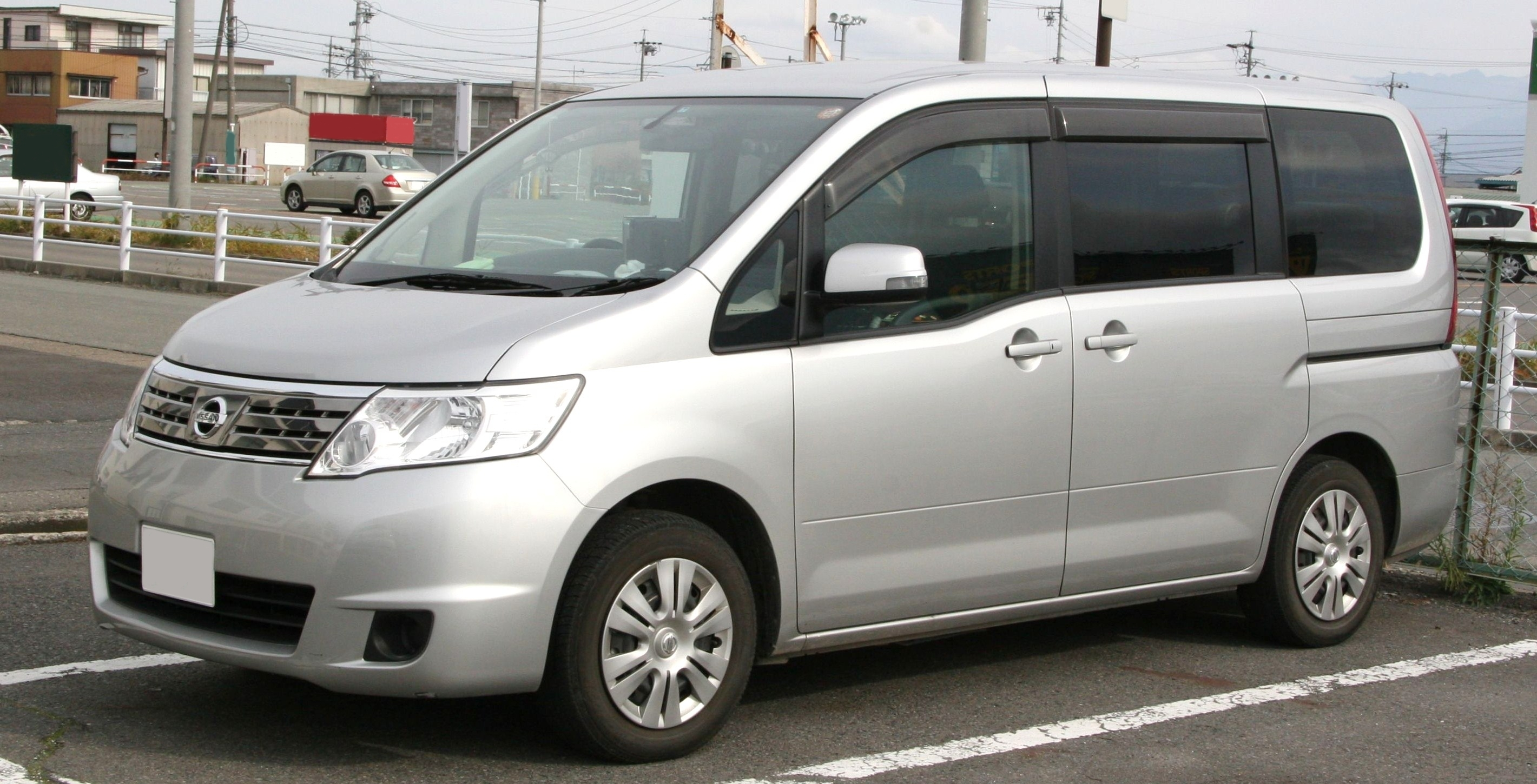
Nissan Serena C25 post-facelift

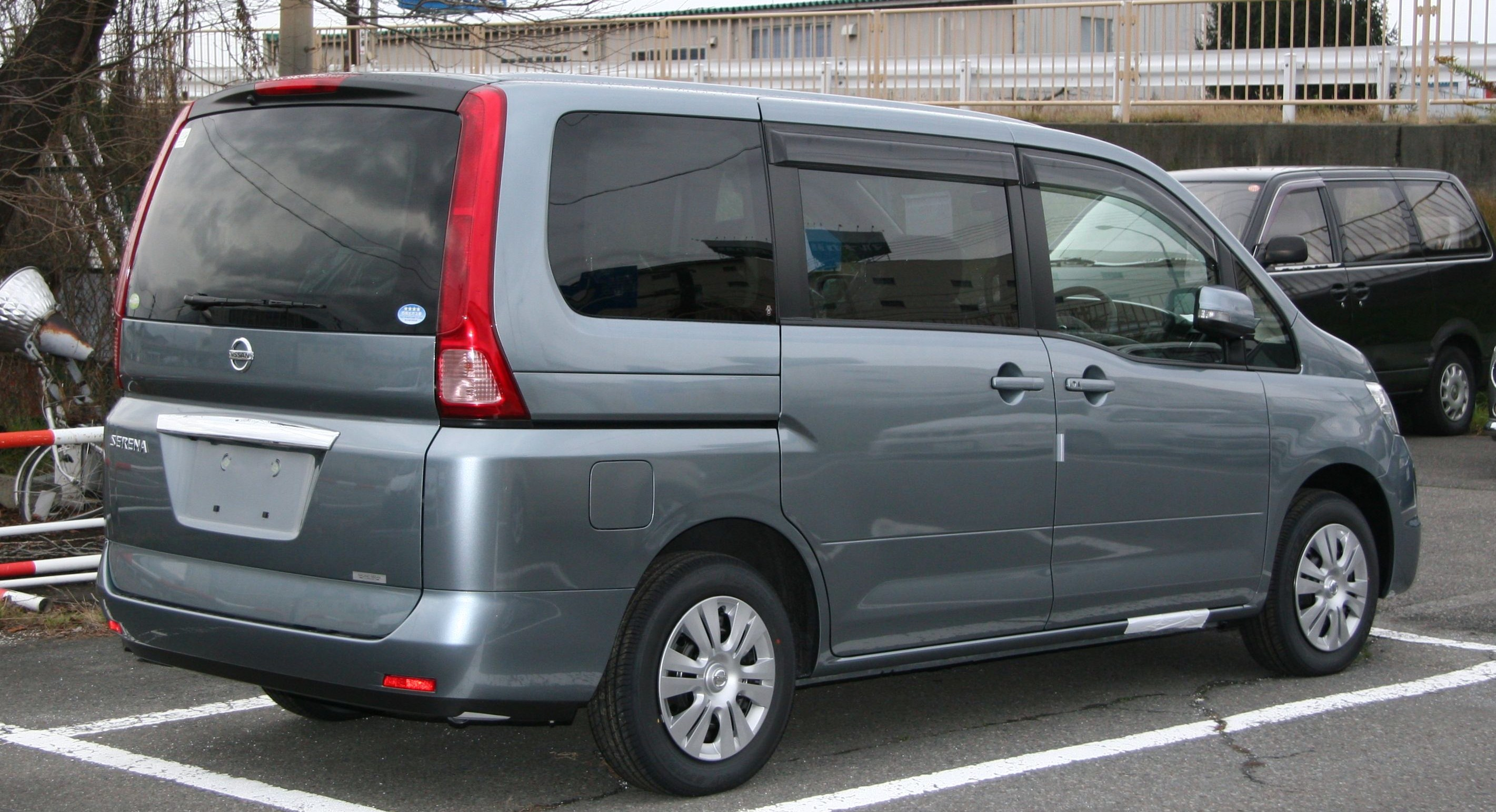
Nissan Serena C25 post-facelift rear

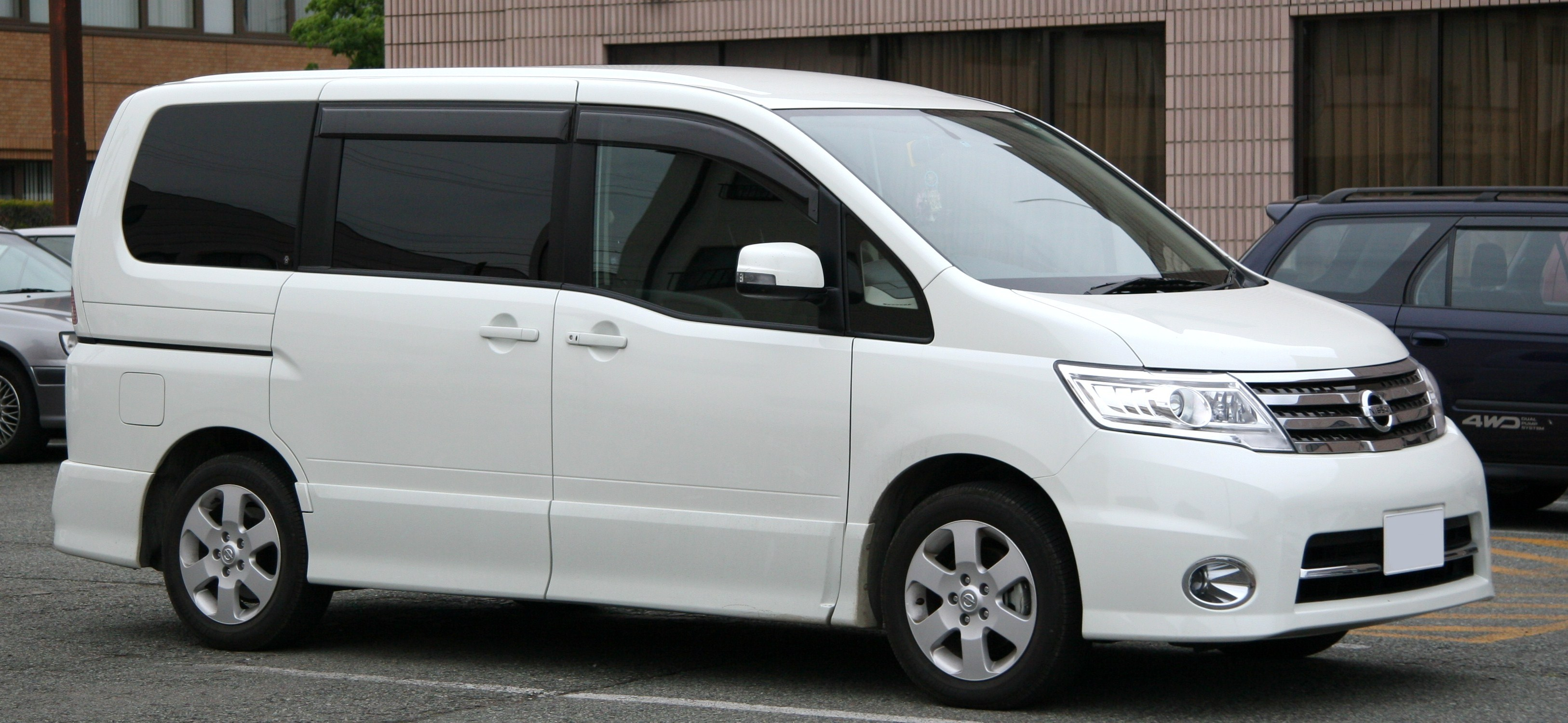
Nissan Serena C25 Highway Star post-facelift

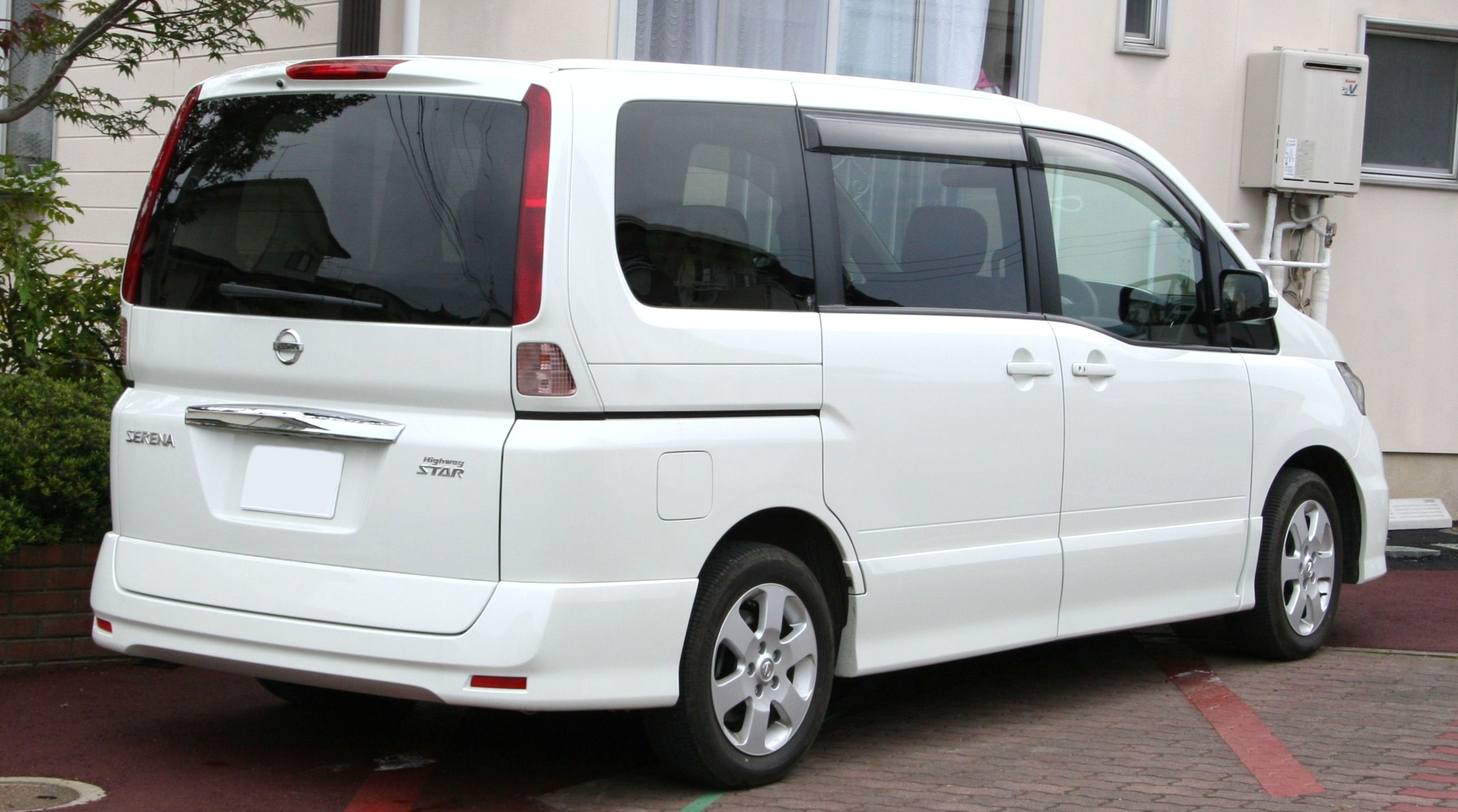
Nissan Serena C25 Highway Star post-facelift rear

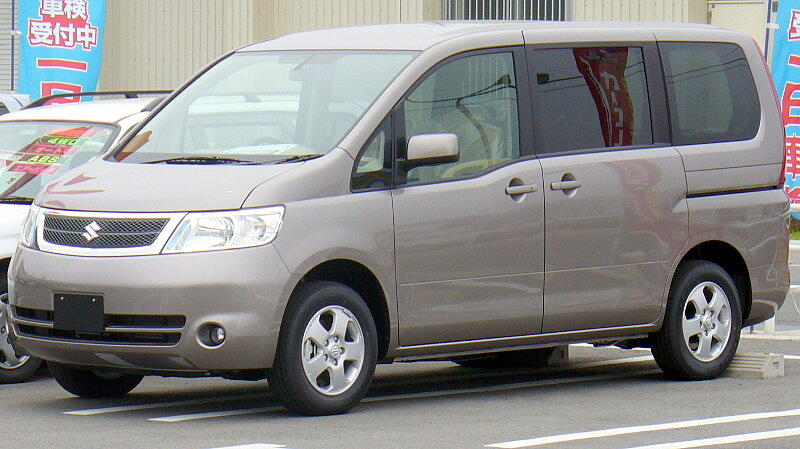
Suzuki Landy pre-facelift

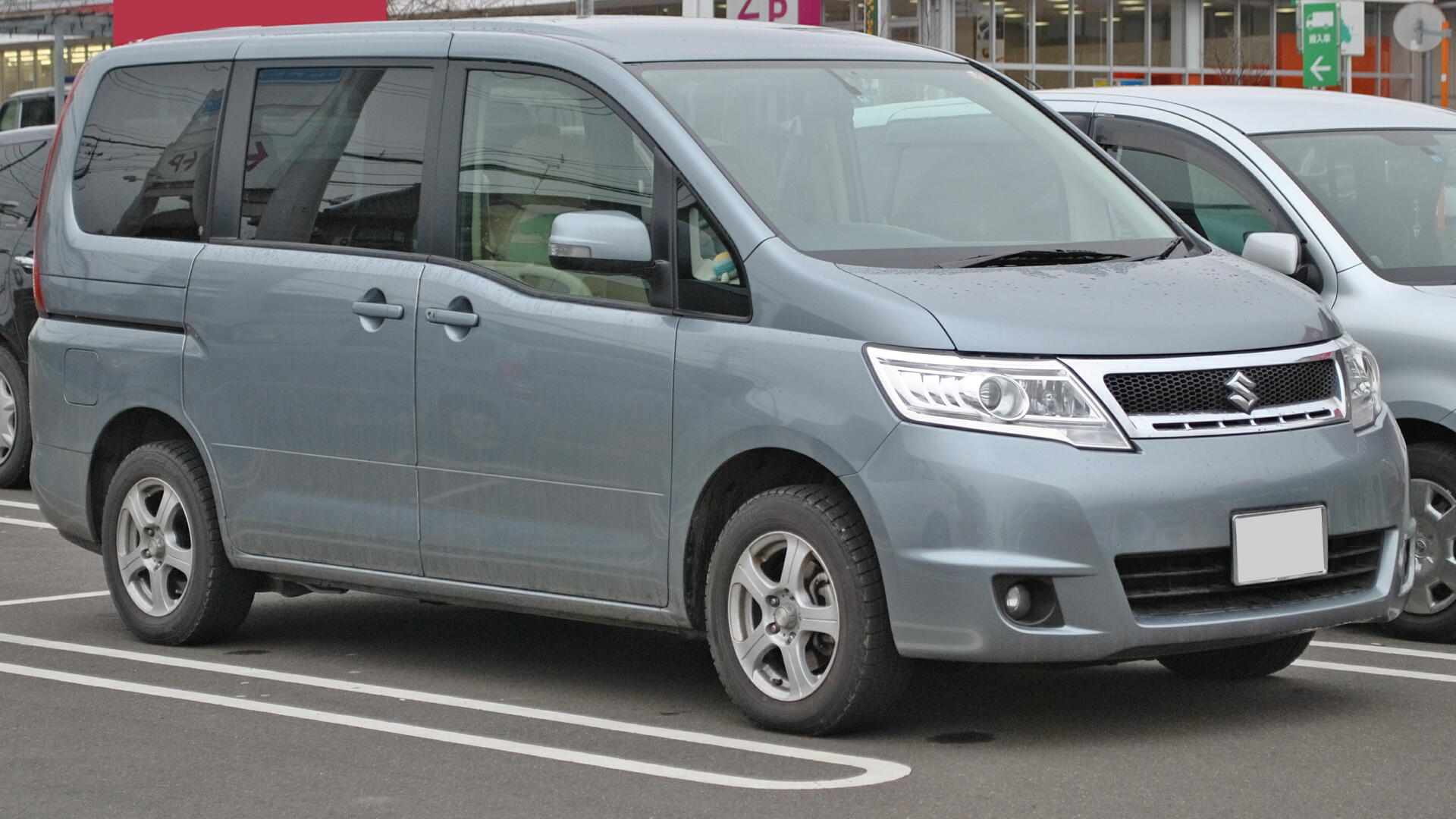
Suzuki Landy post-facelift

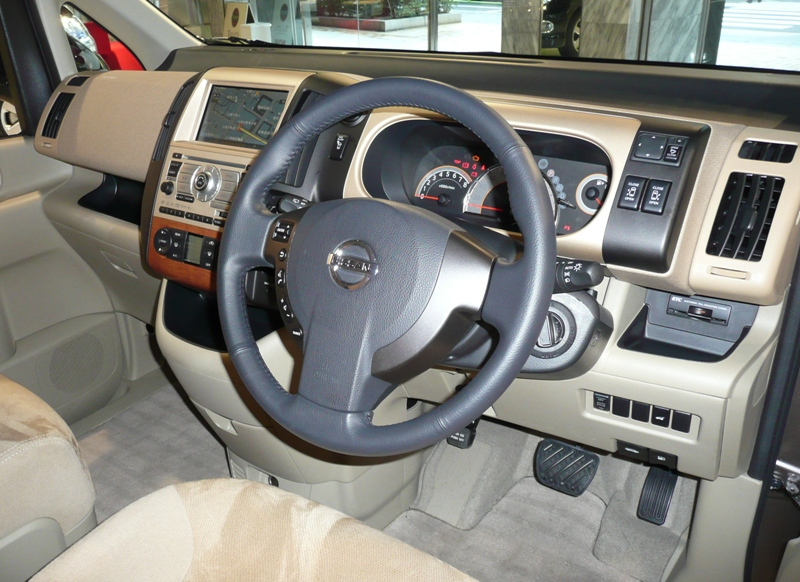
Nissan Serena interior

== Fourth generation (C26; 2010) ==
Fourth generation
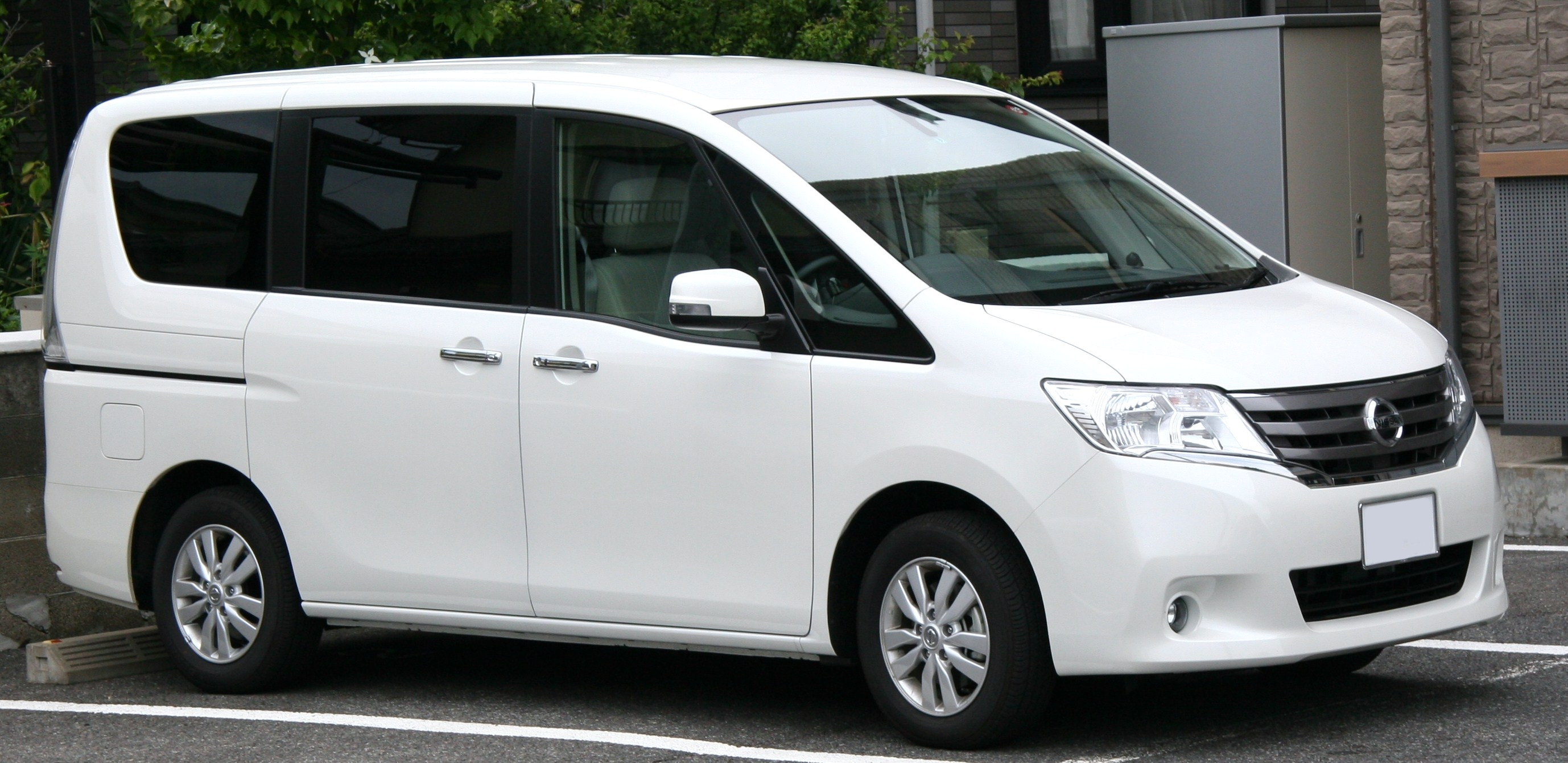

Overview
- Model code: C26
- Also called: Suzuki Landy
- Production: 2010–2016 (Japan); 2012–2019 (Indonesia); 2014–2018 (Malaysia)
- Assembly: Japan: Kanda, Fukuoka (Nissan Motor Kyushu); Indonesia: Purwakarta (NMI); Malaysia: Serendah (TCMA)

Body and chassis
- Body style: 5-door minivan
- Layout: Front-engine, front-wheel-drive Front-engine, four-wheel-drive

Powertrain
- Engine: 2.0 L MR20DD DI I4; 2.0 L MR20DD S-Hybrid DI I4
- Transmission: Xtronic CVT

Dimensions
- Wheelbase: 2,860 mm (112.6 in)
- Length: 4,685–4,770 mm (184.4–187.8 in)
- Width: 1,695–1,735 mm (66.7–68.3 in)
- Height: 1,865–1,875 mm (73.4–73.8 in)
- Curb weight: 1,600–1,720 kg (3,527–3,792 lb)

The 2011 Nissan Serena was released in late November 2010 to the Japanese market, equipped with a new 2.0-litre MR20DD direct injection inline-four petrol engine. This model was sold in Japan, Hong Kong, Malaysia and Indonesia.

In August 2012, Nissan added their newly developed simple hybrid system called Smart Simple Hybrid or S-Hybrid. The Nissan Serena C26 S-HYBRID has its regeneration capacity and output power of the Eco Motor, which is an alternator that is used for Nissan's Serena having an idling stop mechanism and capable of restarting an engine, upgraded. Nissan added a lead sub-battery in the engine room for extended energy regeneration capacity. The Serena has a fuel economy of 15.2 km/L (approx 35.8 mpg) under the JC08 test mode.

In Indonesia, the C26 Serena was locally assembled and went on sale on 8 January 2013. The Autech version of the Highway Star trim was added in September 2013. The facelift version of the C26 Serena was launched on 13 March 2015. It was locally assembled until 2019

In Malaysia, Tan Chong launched Nissan Serena S-Hybrid in July 2013 being fully imported from Japan and only available in one trim level: Highway Star. In November 2014, the facelift version was launched, being locally assembled in Malaysia and available in two trim levels: Highway Star and Premium Highway Star. In July 2016, Impul versions were made available.

=== Gallery ===
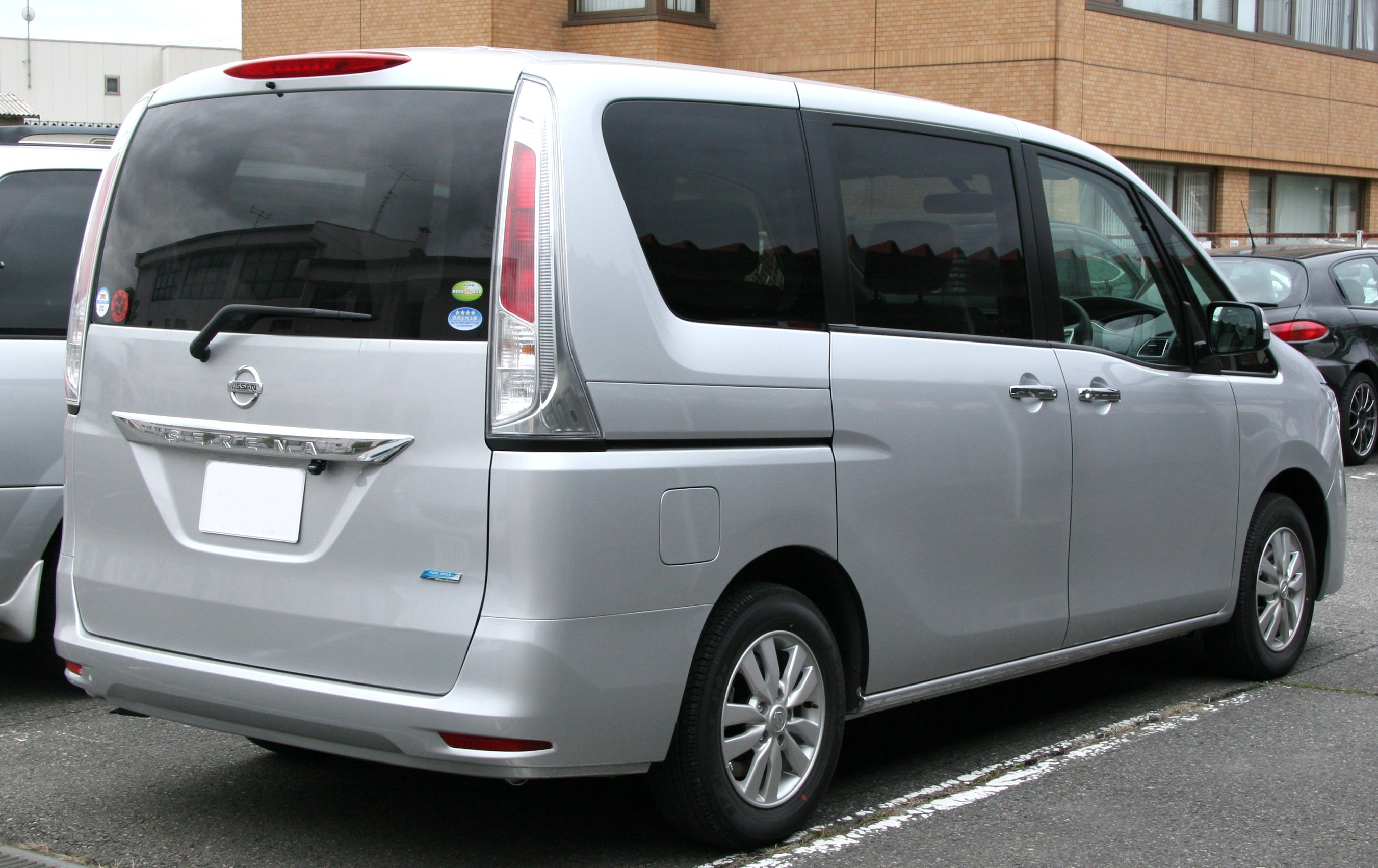
Nissan Serena C26, pre-facelift rear

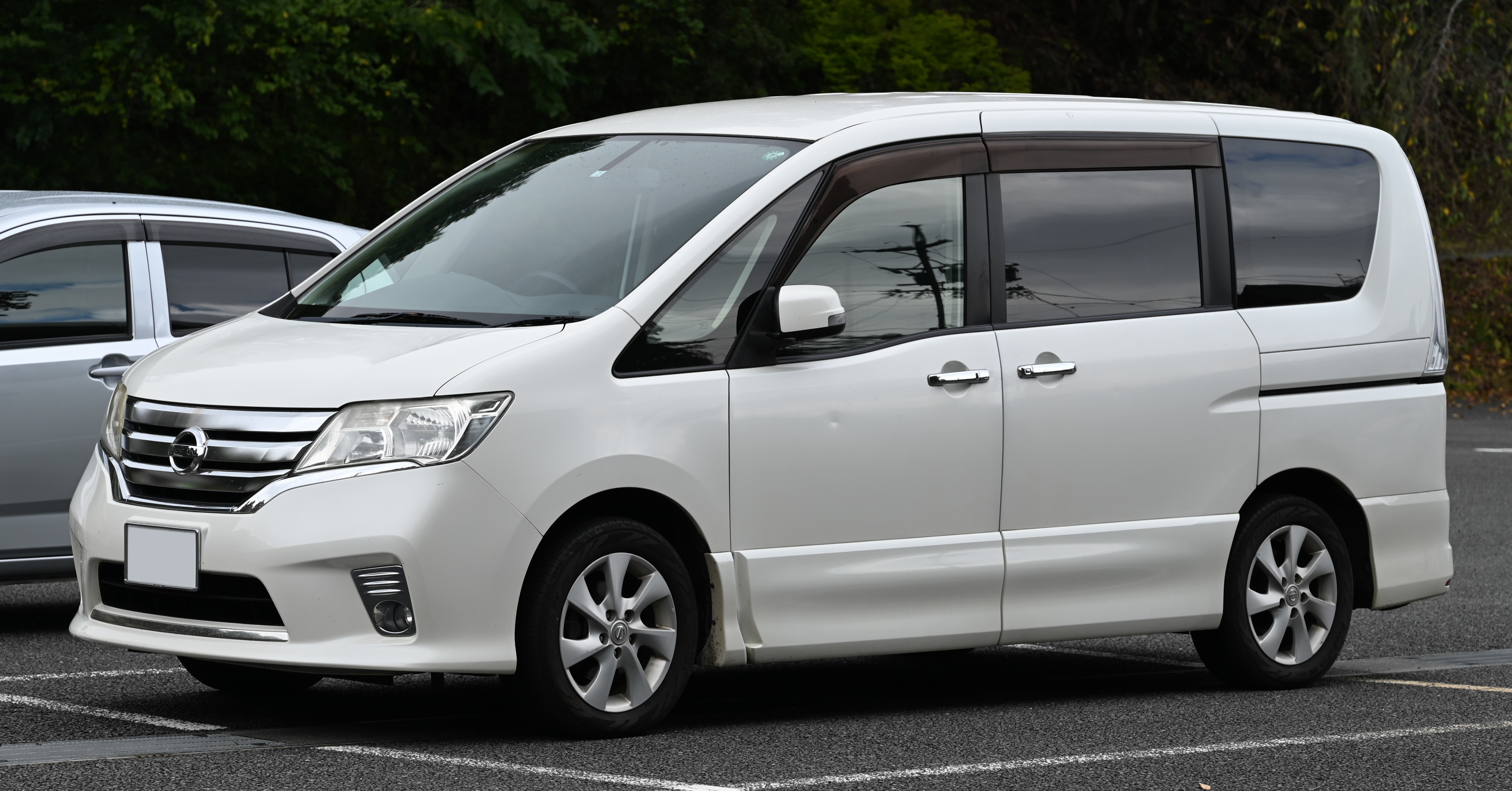
Nissan Serena Highway Star, pre-facelift

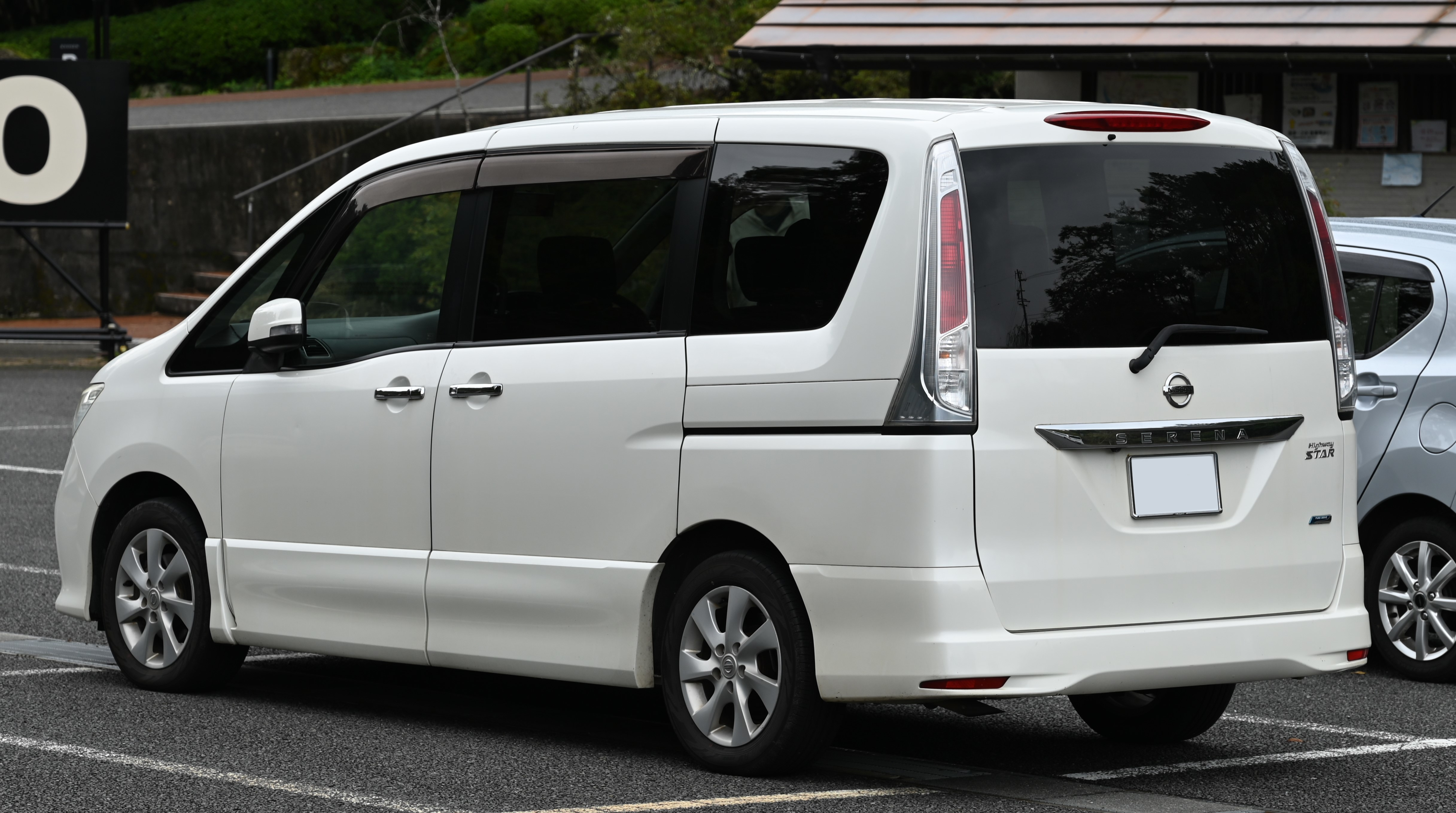
Nissan Serena Highway Star, pre-facelift rear

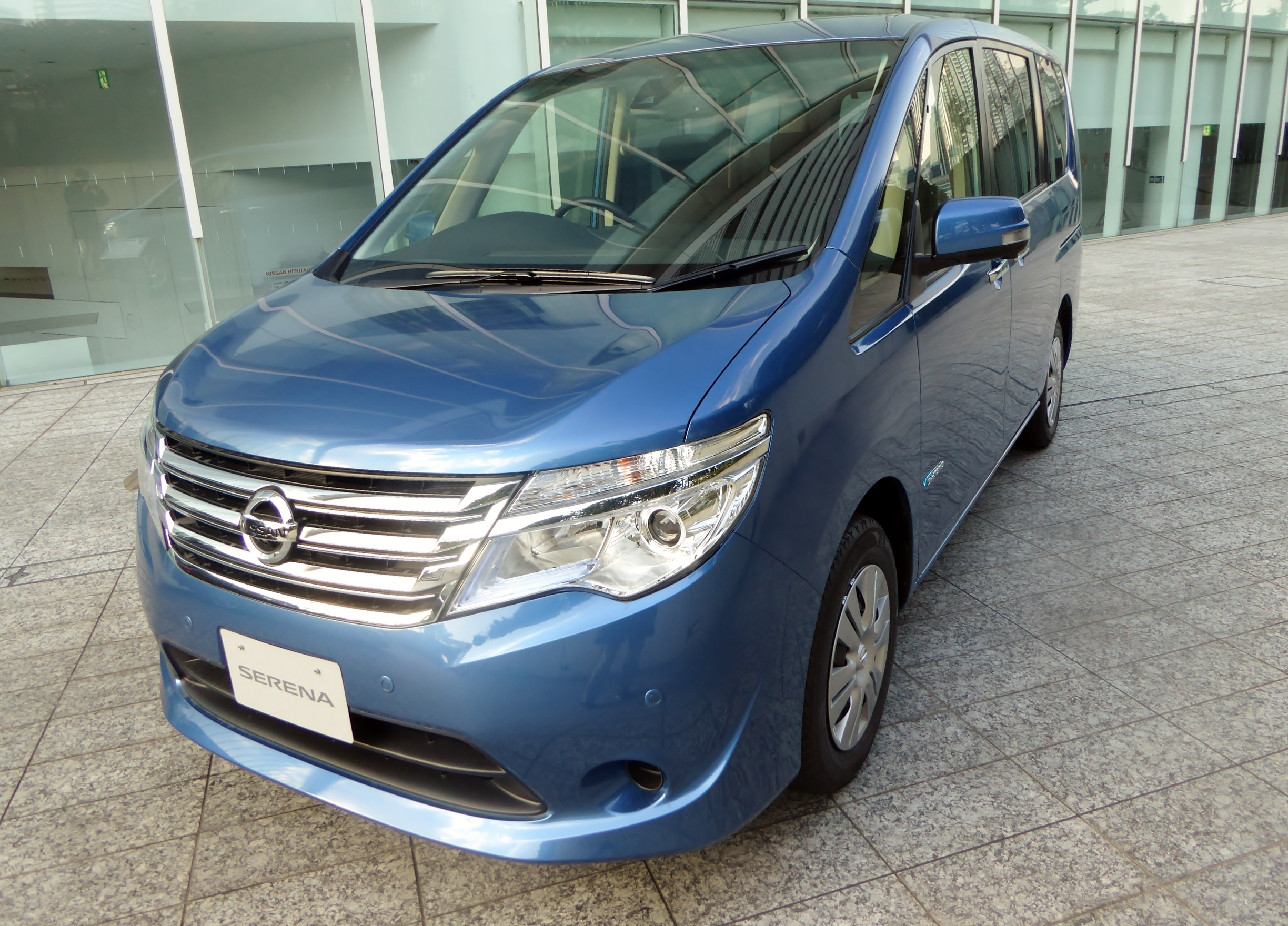
Nissan Serena S-Hybrid (facelift)

Nissan Serena Highway Star S-Hybrid (facelift)

Nissan Serena Highway Star S-Hybrid, facelift rear

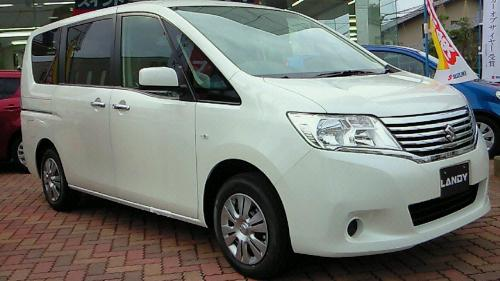
Suzuki Landy pre-facelift

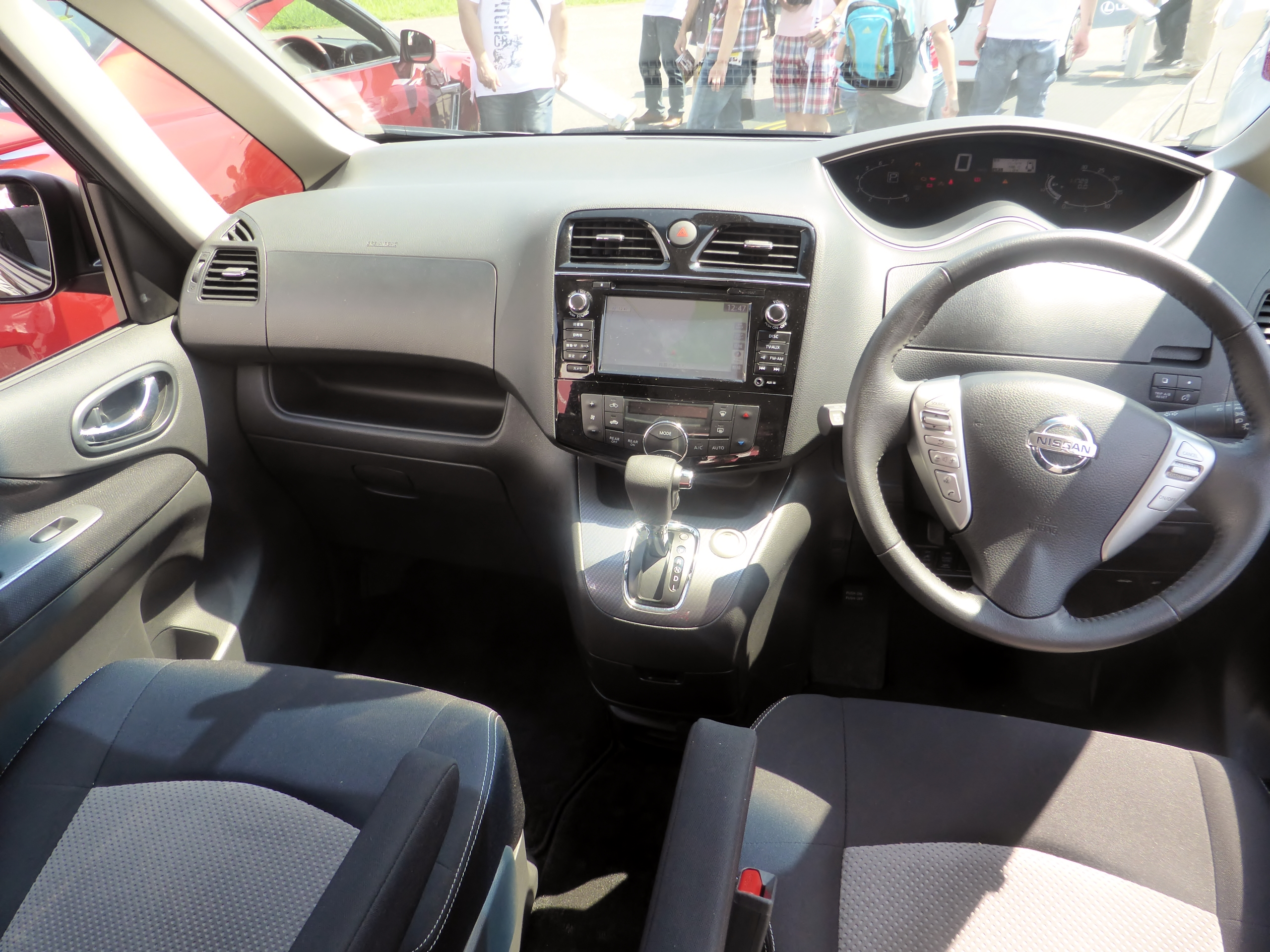
Nissan Serena interior

== Fifth generation (C27; 2016) ==
Fifth generation
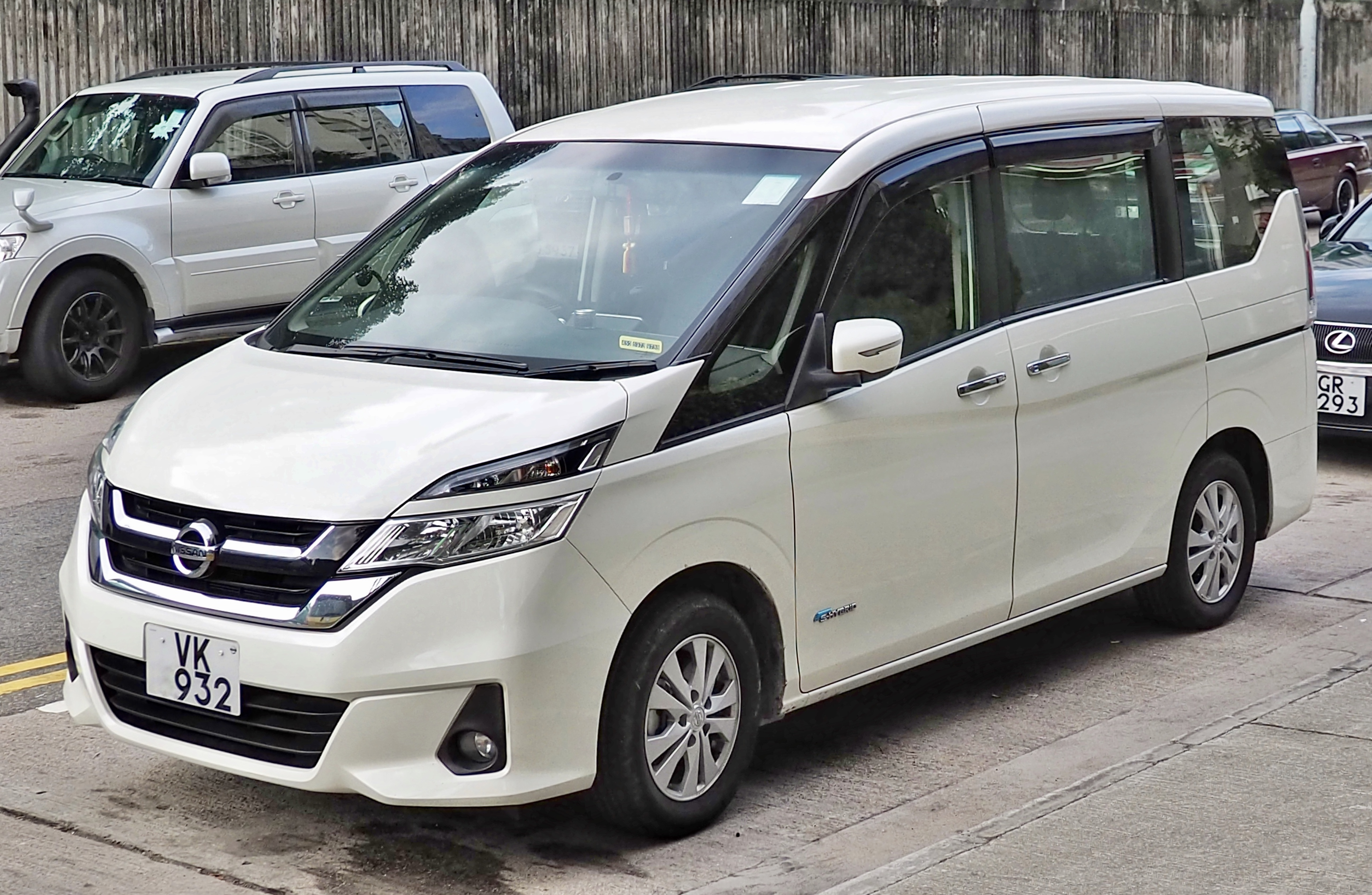
- 2016 Nissan Serena X (C27; pre-facelift, Hong Kong)

Overview
- Model code: C27
- Also called: Suzuki Landy
- Production: 2016–2022; 2018–2026 (Malaysia)
- Assembly: Japan: Kanda, Fukuoka (Nissan Motor Kyushu); Malaysia: Serendah (TCMA)
- Designer: Kensuke Sugimatsu (facelift)

Body and chassis
- Body style: 5-door minivan
- Layout: Front-engine, front-wheel-drive Front-engine, four-wheel-drive

Powertrain
- Engine: 1.2 L HR12DE EFI I3 (generator only; e-Power Hybrid); 2.0 L MR20DD DI I4 (MHEV; S-Hybrid)
- Electric motor: 2x EM57 High Power 96 kW (129 hp), 254 N⋅m (187 lb⋅ft) AC Synchronous electric motor (Serena e-Power)
- Transmission: Xtronic CVT
- Hybrid drivetrain: Mild hybrid (Serena S-Hybrid); Series hybrid (Serena e-Power)
- Battery: 1.57 kWh lithium-ion (Serena e-Power)

Dimensions
- Wheelbase: 2,860 mm (112.6 in)
- Length: 4,685–4,770 mm (184.4–187.8 in)
- Width: 1,695–1,740 mm (66.7–68.5 in)
- Height: 1,865 mm (73.4 in)
- Curb weight: 1,710 kg (3,770 lb)

Nissan unveiled the fifth generation Serena on 6 July 2016, and sales began in Japan on 24 August 2016. The all-new Serena received the ProPilot technology, which does lane centering. The system is designed for highway use, and will only be used in single-lane traffic as a means to keep a car between the lines of a lane on the highway. Nissan's system is operational at speeds between 30 km/h (19 mph) and 100 km/h (62 mph), and is designed to hold the vehicle in the middle of a lane by reading markers and controlling steering. Propilot can follow curves, and it automatically controls the distance between the vehicle ahead.

The Serena e-Power went on sale in March 2018. It is a series hybrid with no plug-in capability powered by the HR12DE straight-three engine.

The C27 Serena debuted in Hong Kong in April 2017.

In Malaysia, the C27 Nissan Serena S-Hybrid was launched on 14 May 2018 as a 7-seater locally assembled MPV and available in two trim levels: Highway Star and Premium Highway Star.

In Singapore, an e-Power powered C27 Nissan Serena was displayed during the 2019 Singapore Motor Show.

The NISMO variant was released in November 2017. This variant includes a redesigned front fascia, 17-inch aluminum wheels, and red accents, and powered by a 2.0L MR20DD. Despite being a NISMO variant, the Serena NISMO focuses on accessories only, and there are no mechanical changes.

In Indonesia, the C27 Serena was launched on 19 February 2019 and is fully imported from Japan. It was offered in Highway Star and X trims.

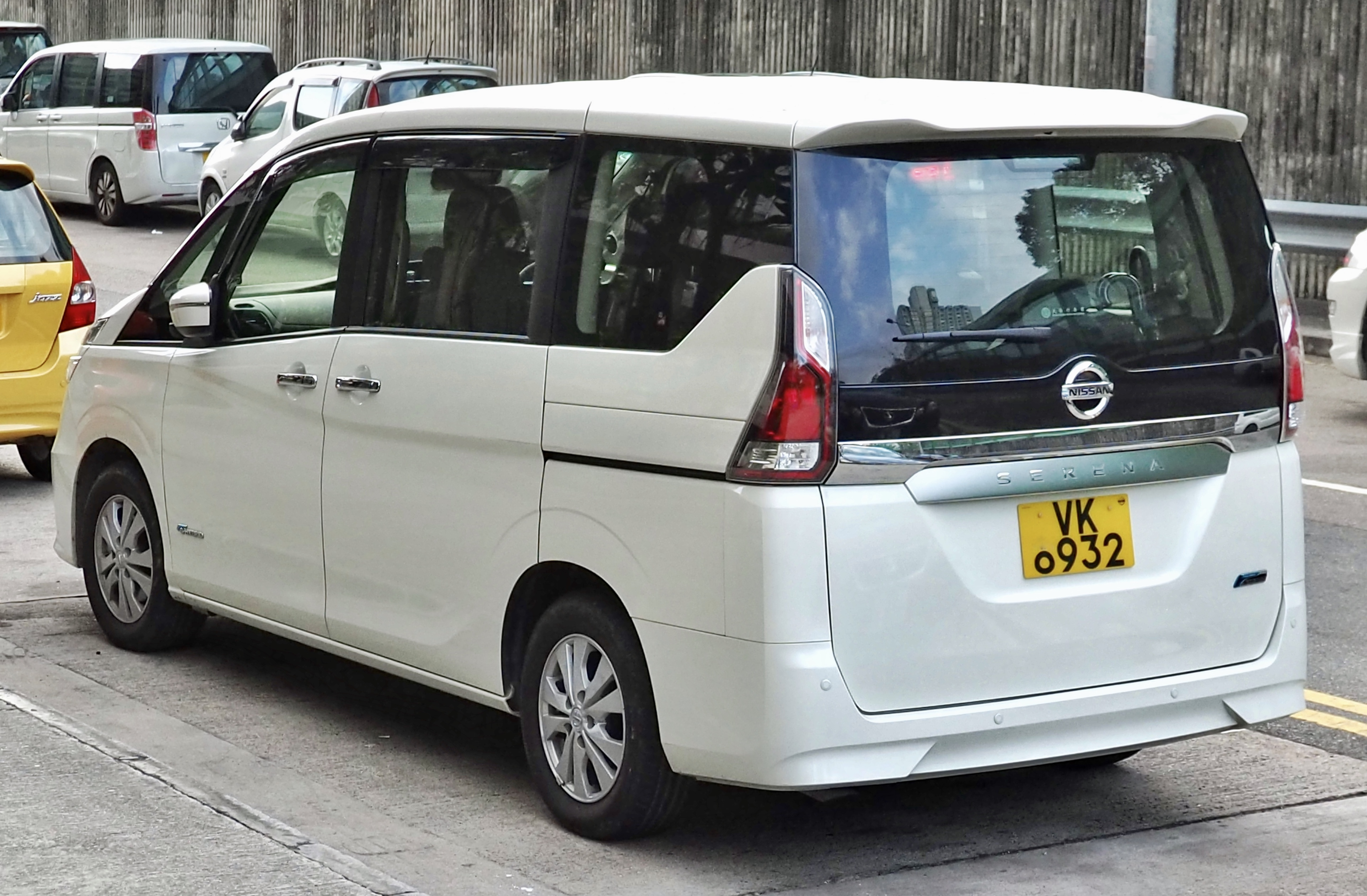
2016 Nissan Serena X (C27; pre-facelift, Hong Kong)

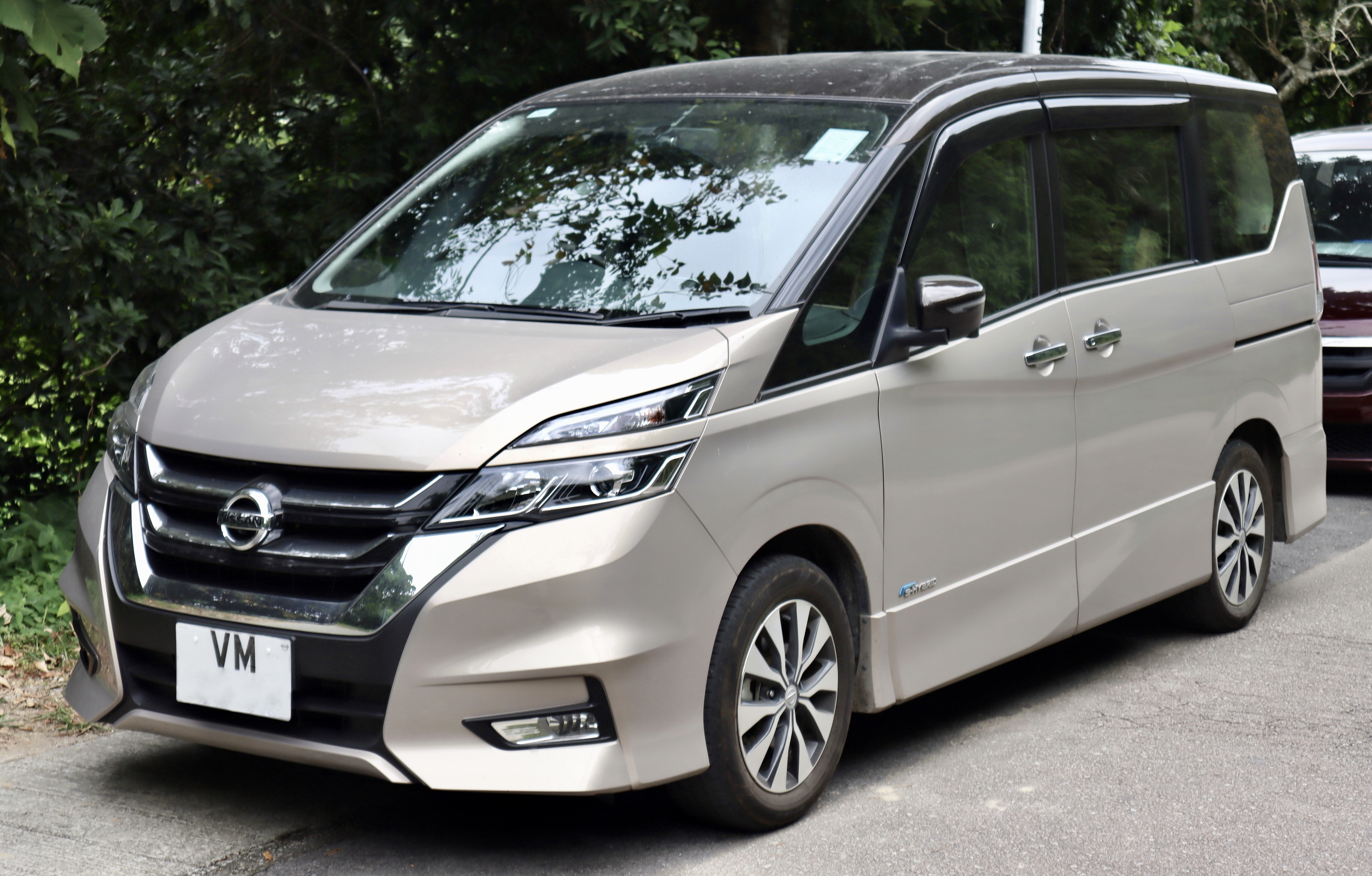
2016 Nissan Serena Highway Star VIP (C27; pre-facelift, Hong Kong)

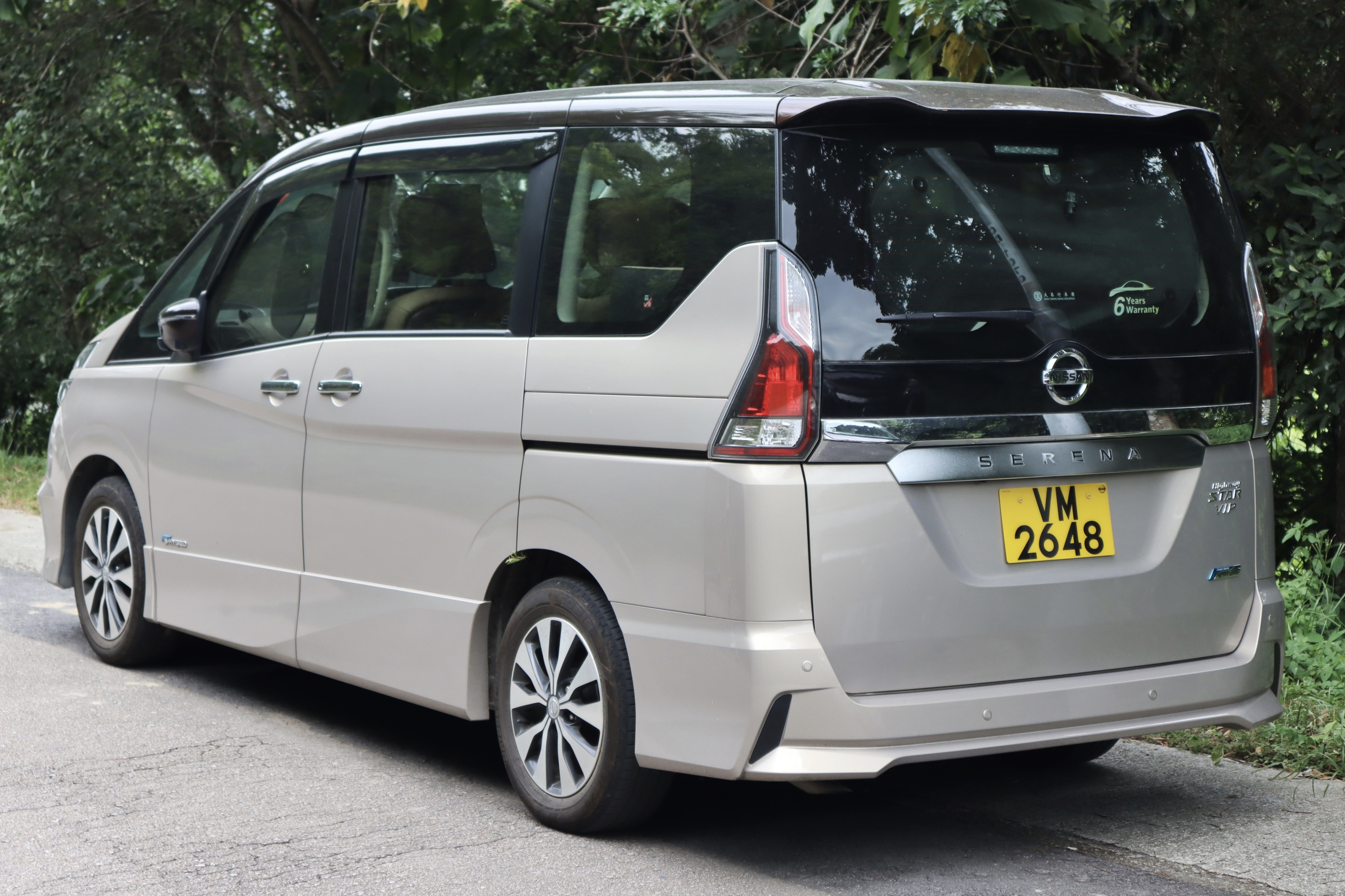
2016 Nissan Serena Highway Star VIP (C27; pre-facelift, Hong Kong)

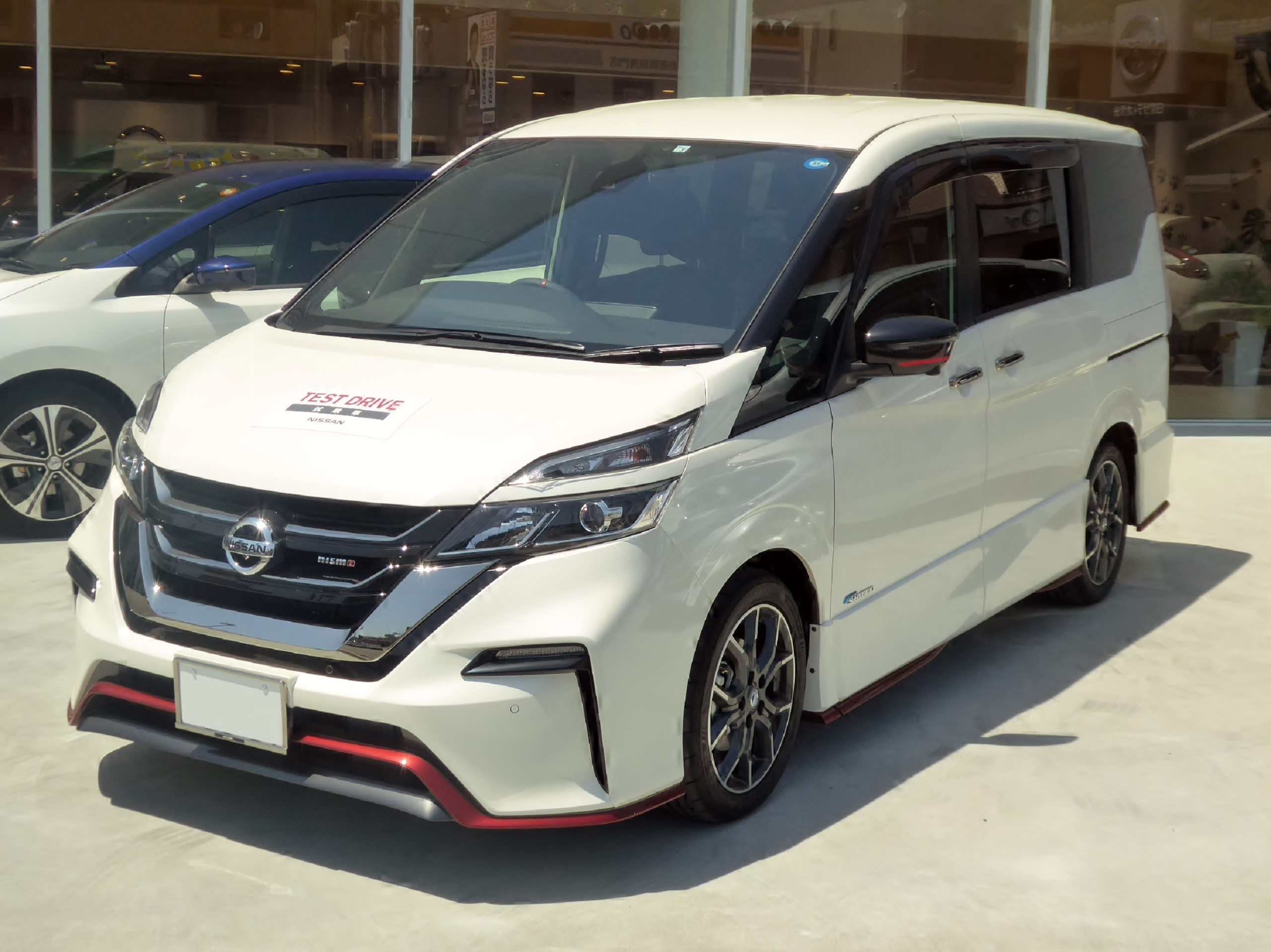
2018 Nissan Serena Nismo

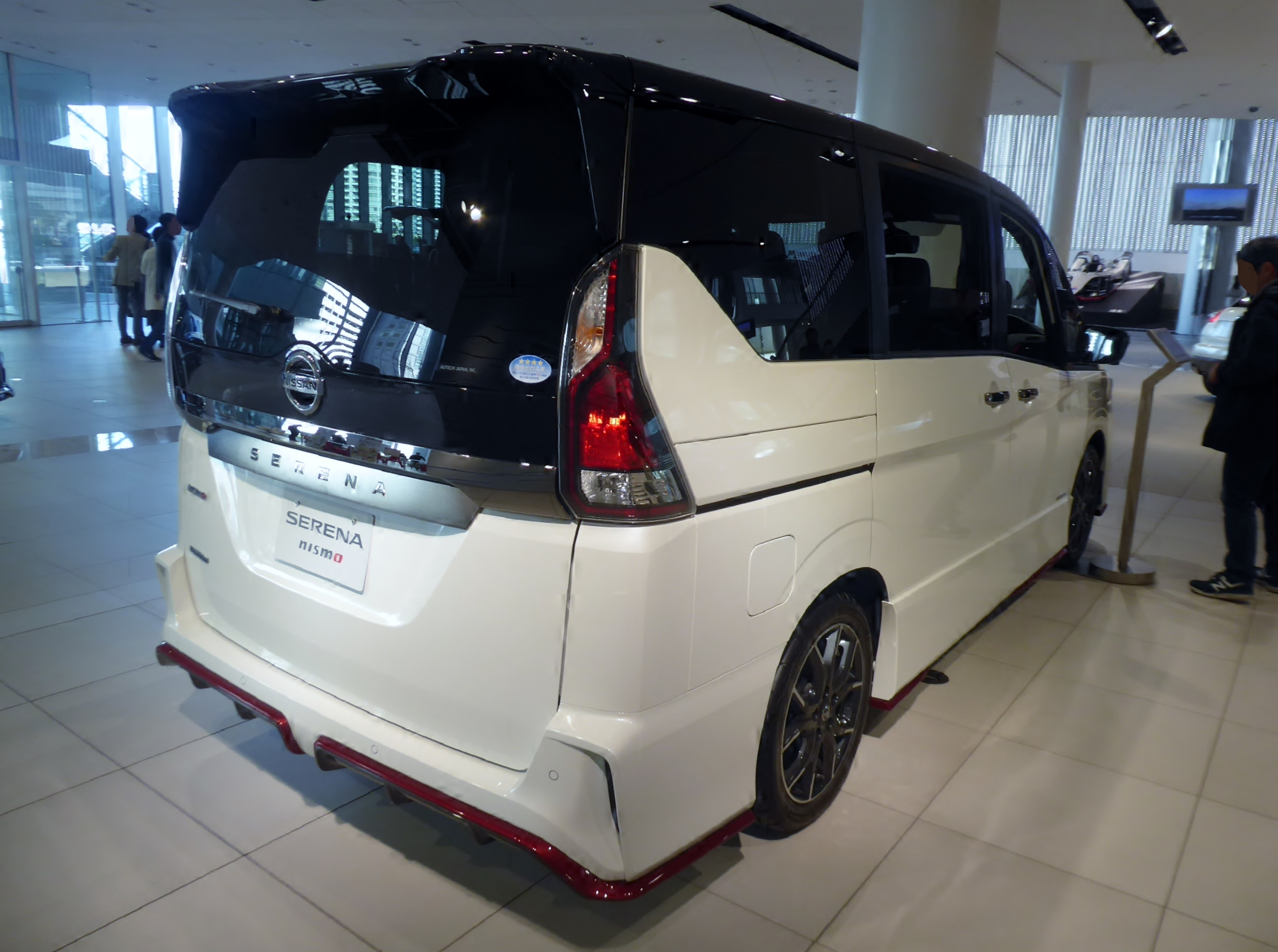
2018 Nissan Serena Nismo

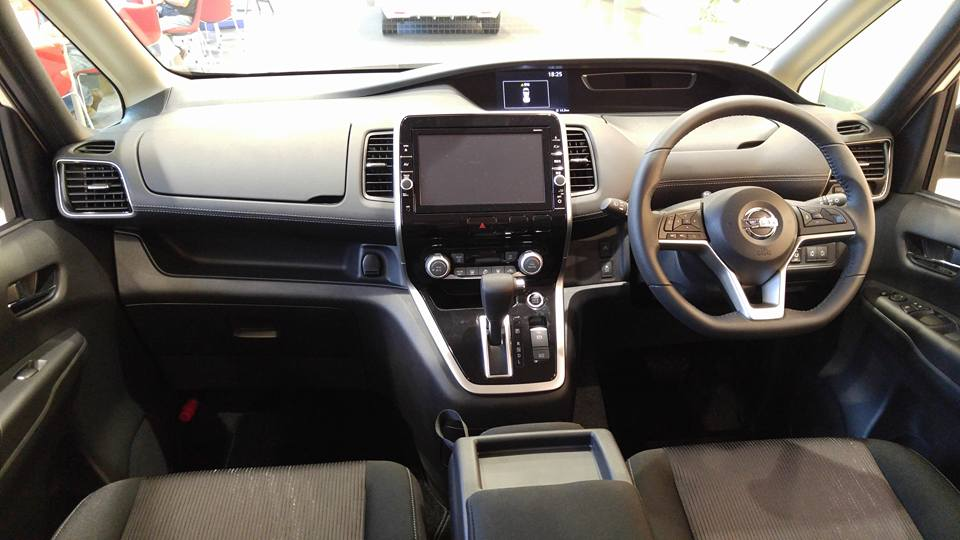
Nissan Serena interior

=== Facelift ===
The C27 Serena received a facelift in Japan on 1 August 2019 with redesigned front grille, front and rear bumpers, and omnidirectional driving support.

In Malaysia, the facelifted C27 Serena S-Hybrid was launched on 6 July 2022.

In Thailand, the facelifted C27 Serena S-Hybrid was launched on 28 November 2024.

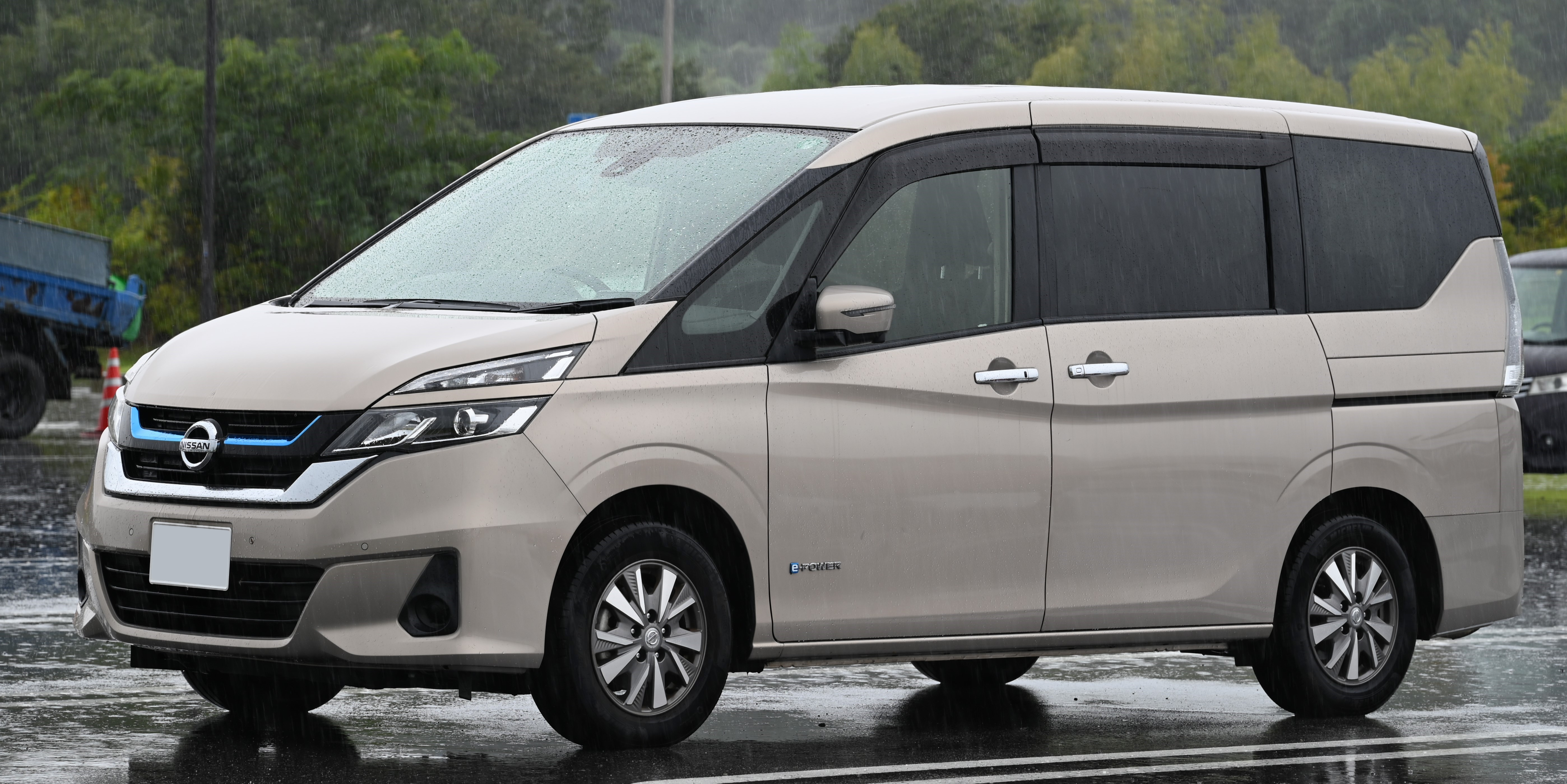
Nissan Serena e-Power X (facelift)

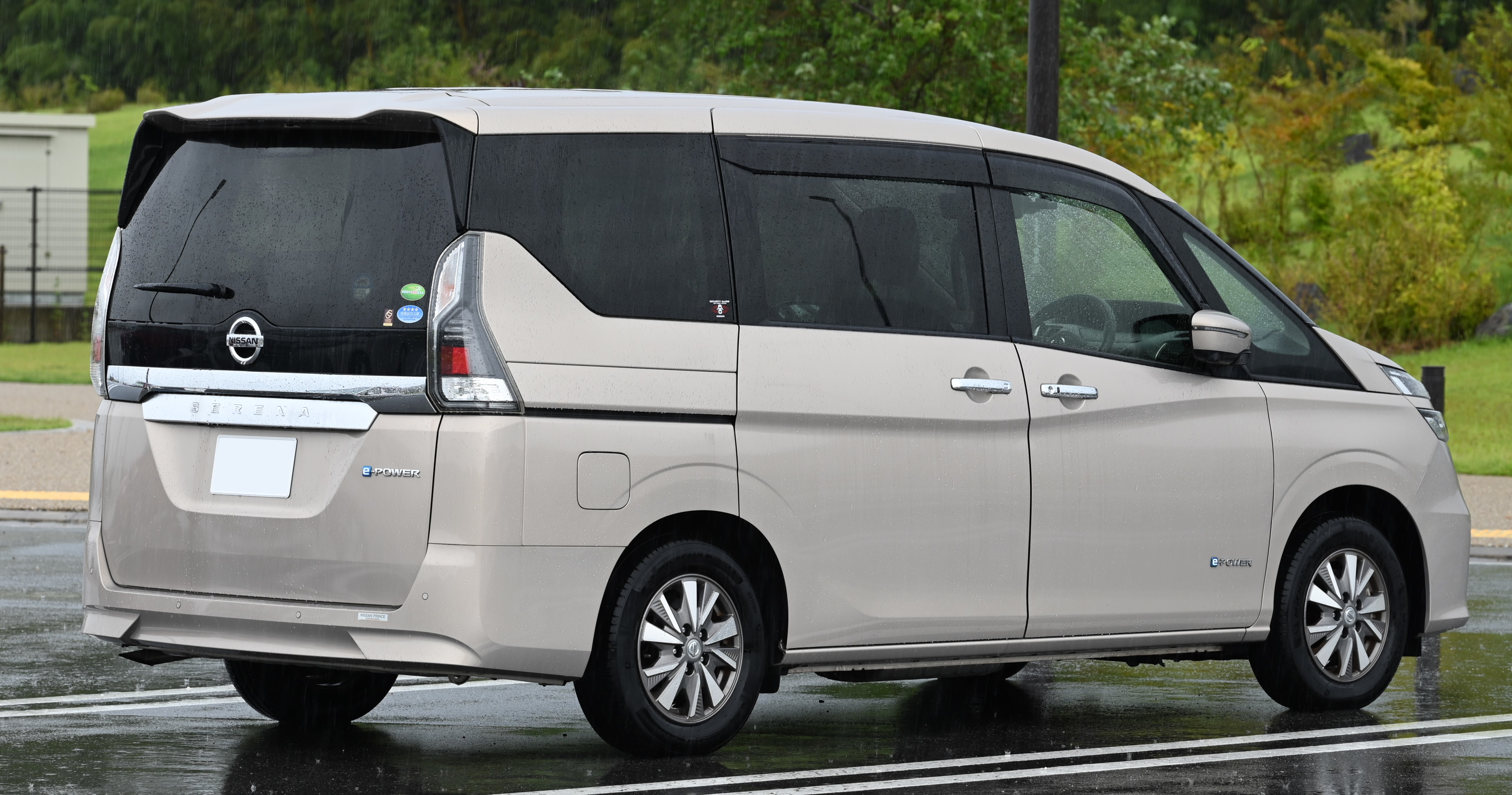
Nissan Serena e-Power X (facelift)

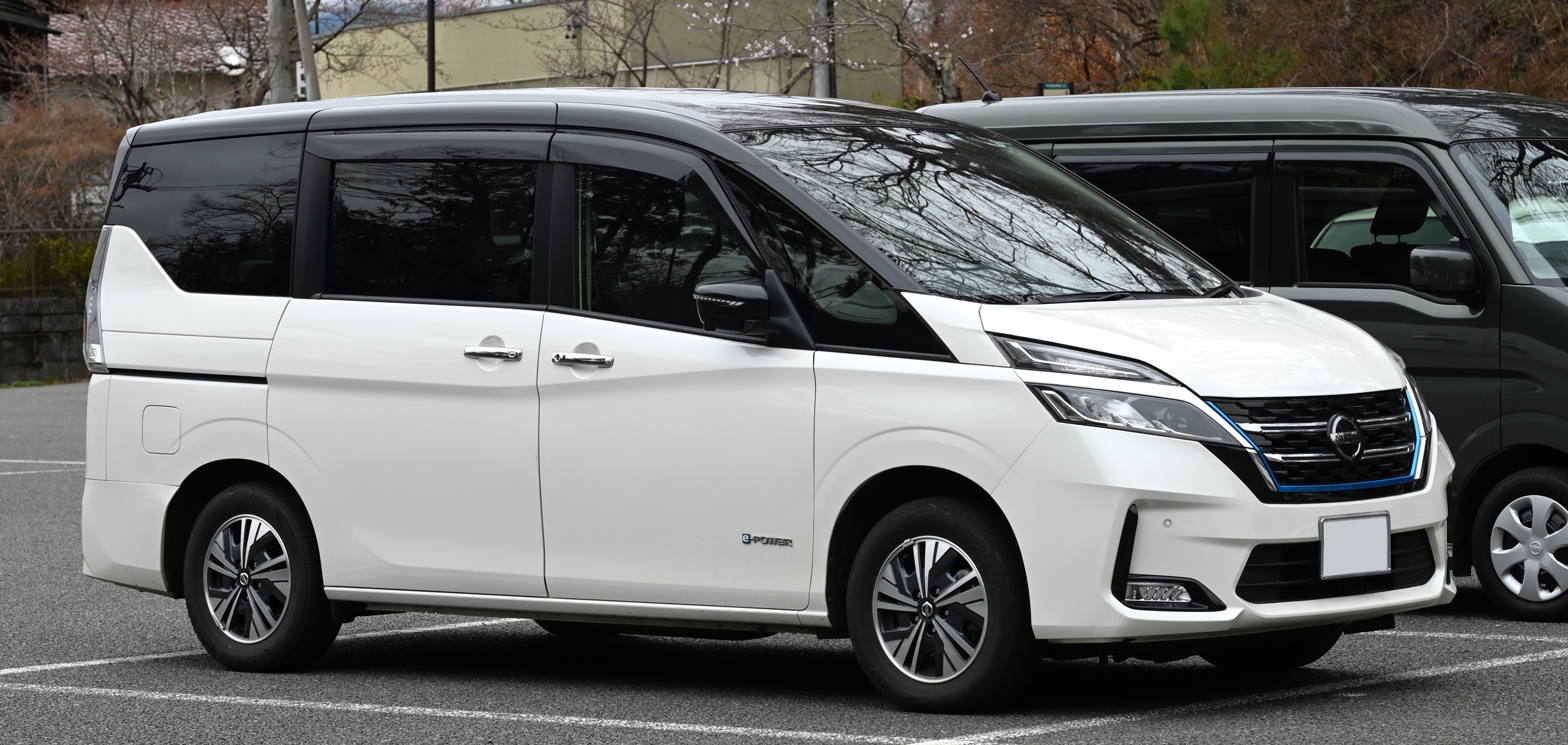
Nissan Serena e-Power XV (HFC27; facelift, Japan)

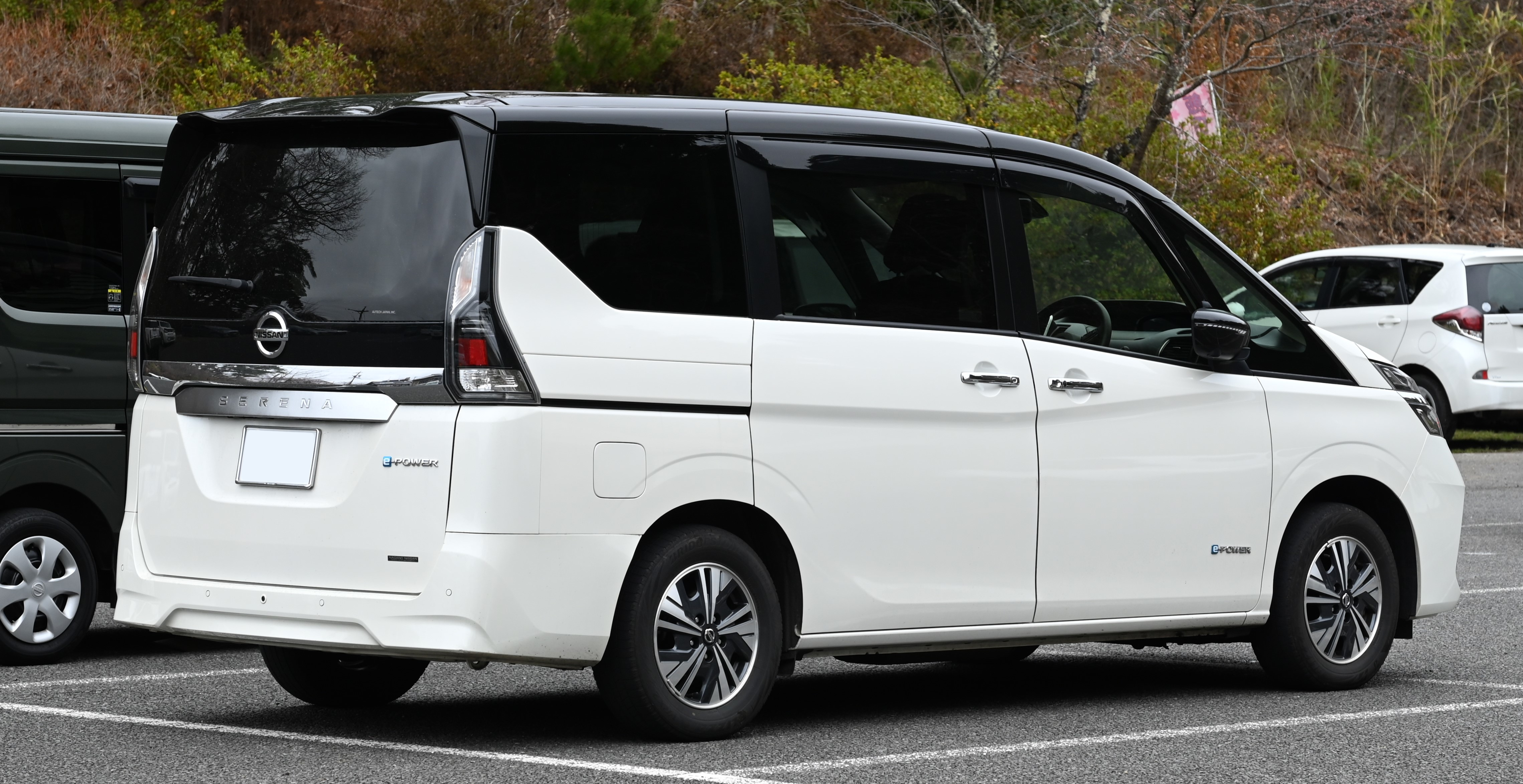
Nissan Serena e-Power XV, rear (HFC27; facelift, Japan)

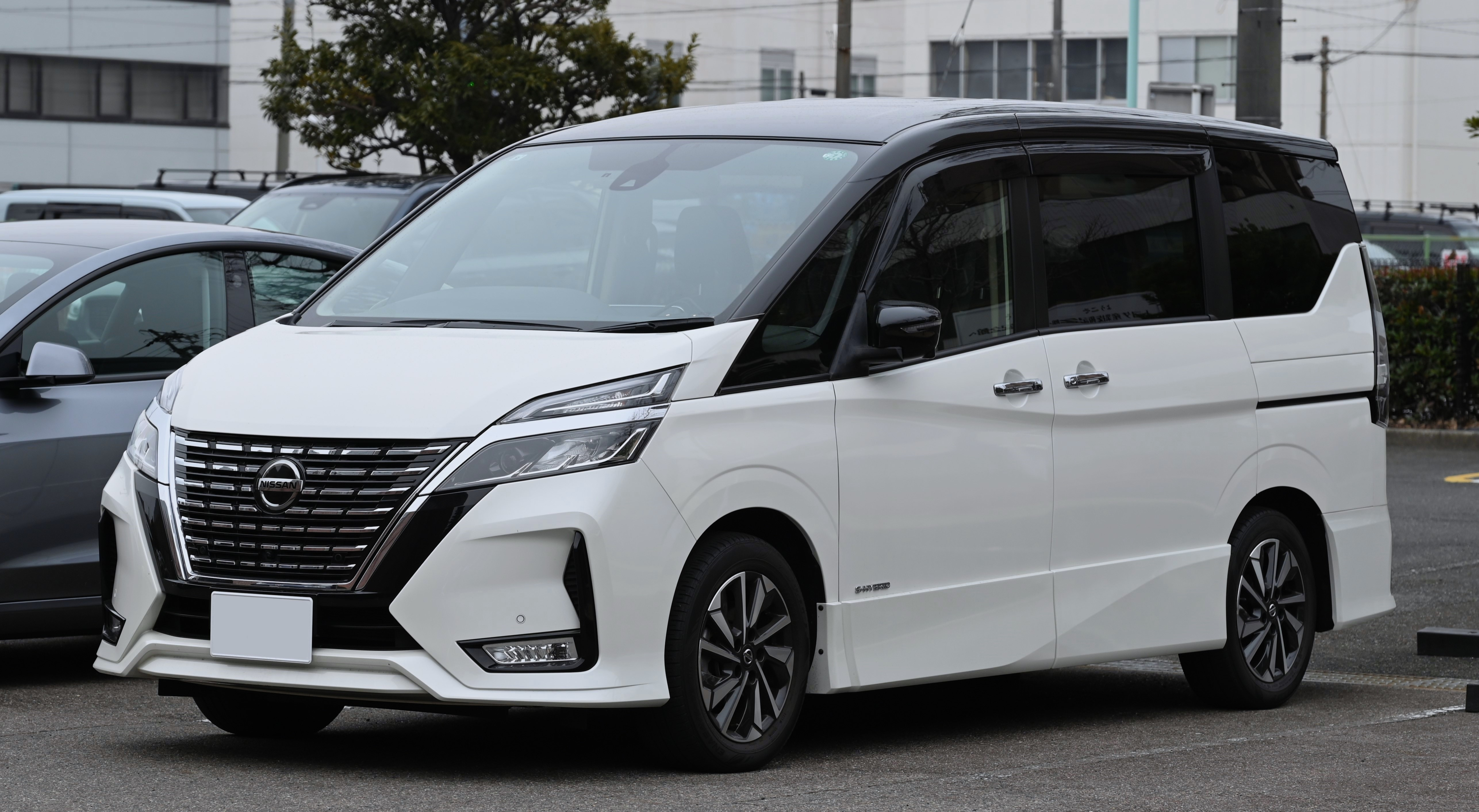
Nissan Serena Highway Star V (GFC27; facelift, Japan)

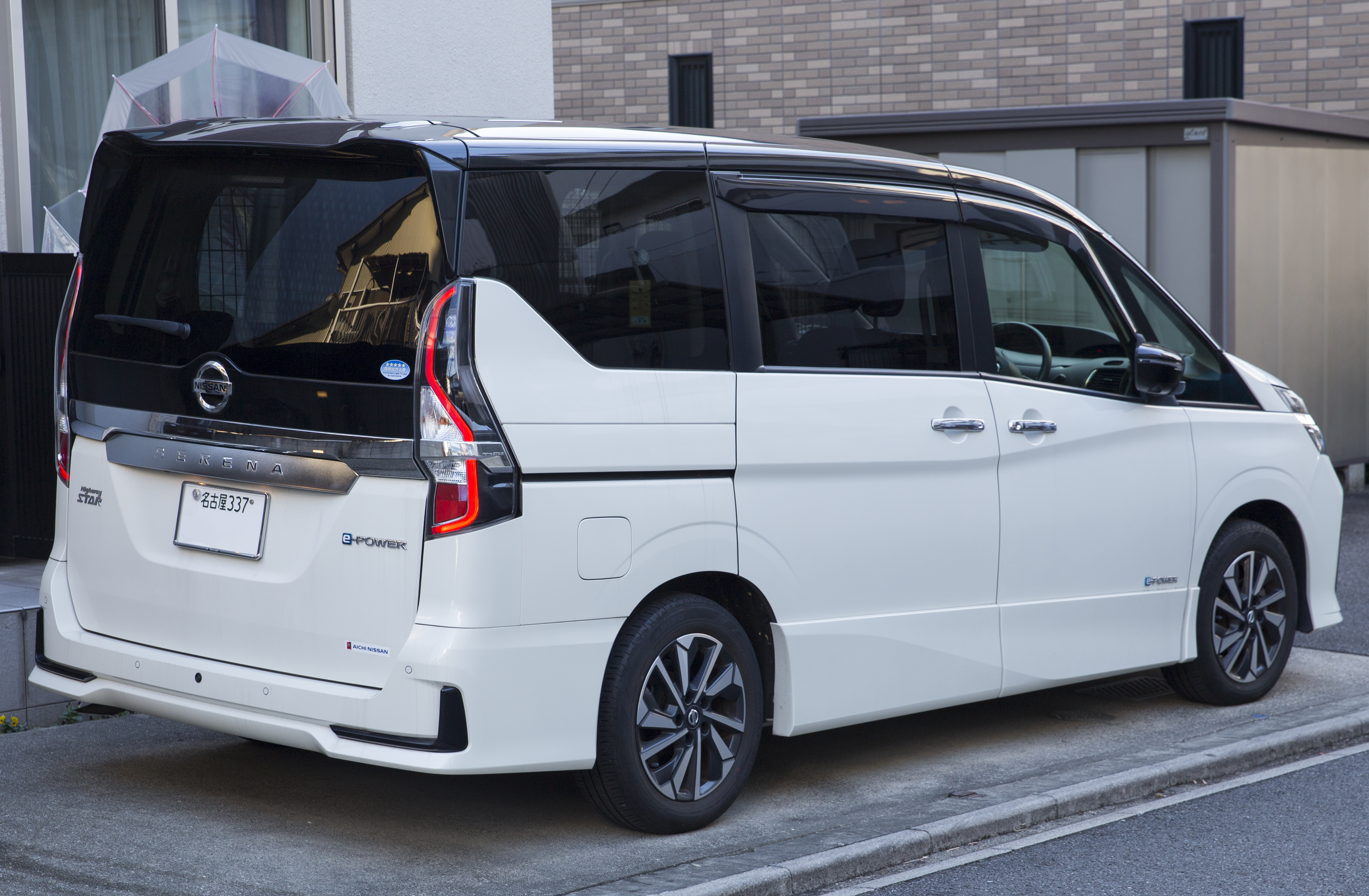
Nissan Serena e-Power Highway Star V, rear (HFC27; facelift, Japan)

=== Specifications ===
==== Engines ====
Petrol-electric hybrid
| Model | Years | Type | Power, torque@rpm |
|---|---|---|---|
| Serena 2WD (5AA-GC27, 5AA-GFC27) | 2018- | 1997 cc I4 (Nissan MR20DD) | 110 kW (150 PS; 148 hp) at 6000 rpm, 200 N⋅m (148 lb⋅ft; 20 kg⋅m) at 4400 rpm |
| Serena 4WD (5AA-GNC27, 5AA-GFNC27) | 2018- | AC synchronous motor (Nissan SM24) | 1.9 kW (2.6 PS; 2.5 hp), 4.8 N⋅m (3.5 lb⋅ft; 0.5 kg⋅m) |
| Serena e-POWER 2WD (6AA-HC27, 6AA-HFC27) | 2018- | 1198 cc I3 (Nissan HR12DE) | 62 kW (84 PS; 83 hp) at 6000 rpm, 103 N⋅m (76 lb⋅ft; 11 kg⋅m) at 3200-5200 rpm |
| Serena e-POWER 2WD (6AA-HC27, 6AA-HFC27) | 2018- | AC synchronous motor (Nissan EM57) | fixed output: 70 kW (95 PS; 94 hp), 320 N⋅m (236 lb⋅ft; 33 kg⋅m) maximum output: 100 kW (136 PS; 134 hp), 320 N⋅m (236 lb⋅ft; 33 kg⋅m) |

==== Transmission ====
Petrol-electric hybrid
| Model | Years | Type |
|---|---|---|
| Serena 2WD (5AA-GC27, 5AA-GFC27) | 2018- | Xtronic CVT |
| Serena 4WD (5AA-GNC27, 5AA-GFNC27) | 2018- | Xtronic CVT |
| Serena e-POWER 2WD (6AA-HC27, 6AA-HFC27) | 2018- | Single Speed Planetary Gear |

== Sixth generation (C28; 2022) ==
Sixth generation
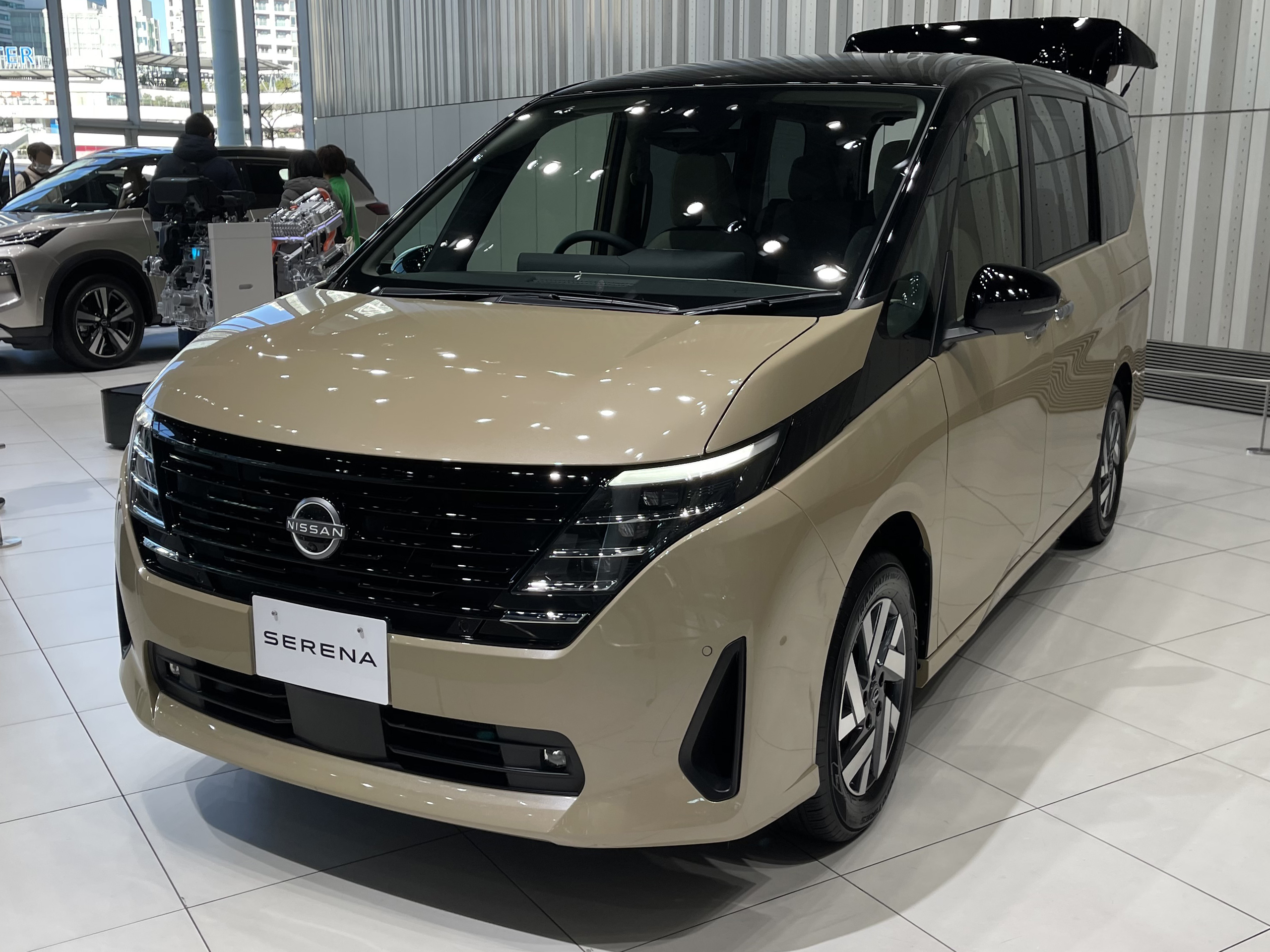
- 2022 Nissan Serena e-Power XV (GC28, Japan)

Overview
- Model code: C28
- Production: November 2022 – present
- Assembly: Japan: Kanda, Fukuoka (Nissan Motor Kyushu); Malaysia: Serendah (TCMA)

Body and chassis
- Layout: Front-engine, front-wheel-drive; Front-engine, four-wheel-drive

Powertrain
- Engine: Petrol: 2.0 L MR20DD I4; Petrol hybrid: 1.4 L HR14DDe I3
- Electric motor: EM57 AC synchronous (1.4 L e-Power hybrid)
- Power output: 110 kW (148 hp; 150 PS) (MR20DD); 72 kW (97 hp; 98 PS) (HR14DDe); 120 kW (161 hp; 163 PS) (EM57 electric motor)
- Transmission: Xtronic CVT (2.0 L petrol); Single speed constant ratio (e-Power)
- Hybrid drivetrain: Series (e-Power)
- Battery: Lithium-ion

Dimensions
- Wheelbase: 2,870 mm (113.0 in)
- Length: 4,690–4,765 mm (184.6–187.6 in)
- Width: 1,695–1,715 mm (66.7–67.5 in)
- Height: 1,870–1,895 mm (73.6–74.6 in)
- Kerb weight: 1,670–1,850 kg (3,681.7–4,078.6 lb)

=== Overview ===
The sixth-generation Serena (C28) was unveiled in Japan on 28 November 2022 as the successor to the C27 series.

=== Design ===
The C28 Serena adopted Nissan's contemporary V-Motion Shield front-end design, characterised by a wide, upright grille, slim LED headlamps integrated into the front fascia, and a more upright MPV-oriented body intended to maximise interior space.

=== Interior and technology ===
The C28 Serena's interior was redesigned around a clean, family-focused layout, with a 2-2-3 seven-seat configuration on e-POWER models, flexible second- and third-row seating, captain's chairs and personal tables on higher grades, tri-zone automatic climate control, ambient lighting, and large sliding doors for easier access. Technology included an available 12.3-inch digital instrument cluster, a 12.3-inch NissanConnect touchscreen with wireless Apple CarPlay and wireless Android Auto, a wireless charging pad, USB Type-A and Type-C ports, and an Intelligent Around View Monitor. Driver-assistance equipment ranged from ProPILOT with navigation-linked functions to ProPILOT 2.0, an emergency stop assist system, blind-spot intervention, and ProPILOT Parking on selected variants.

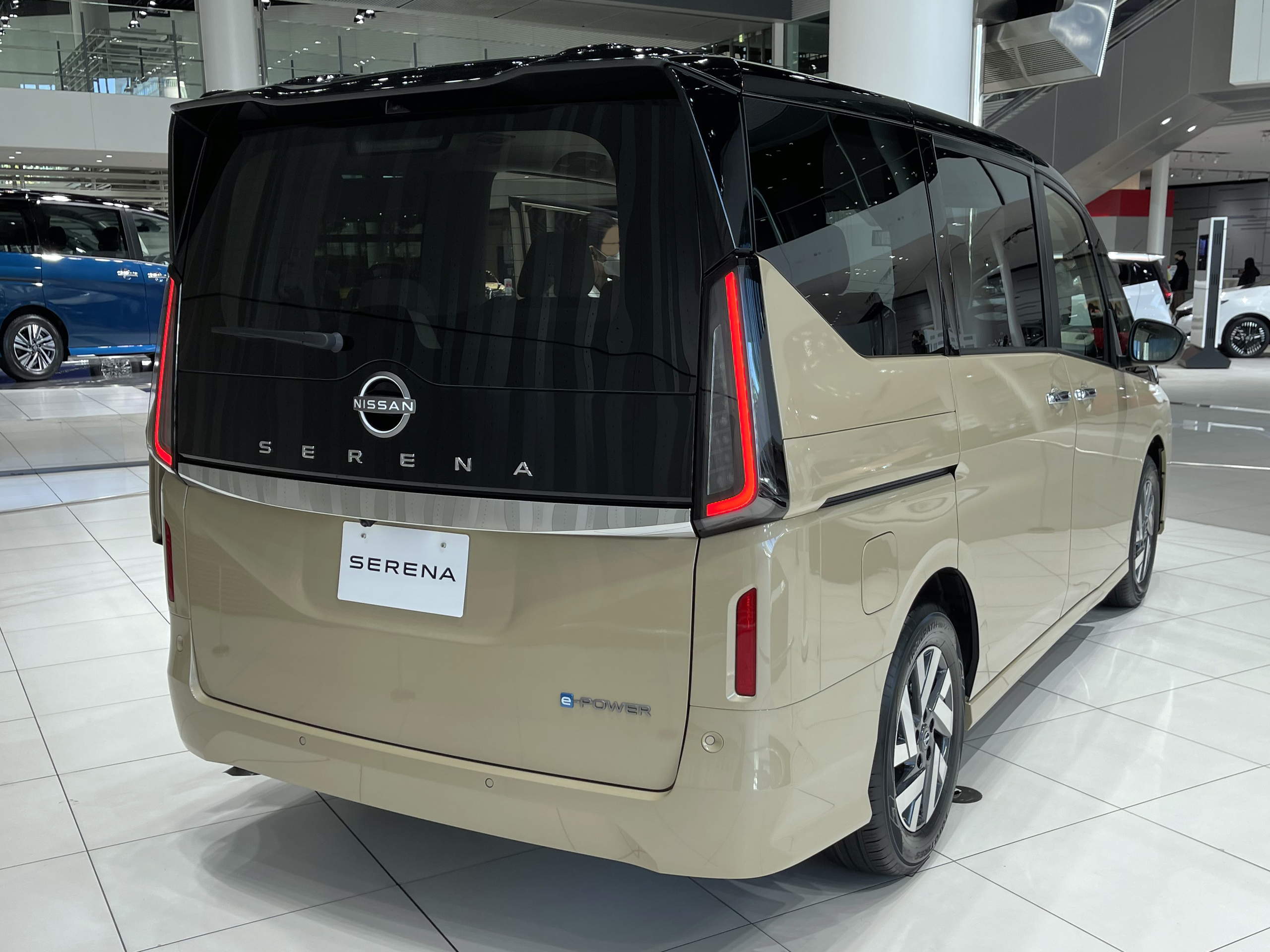
2022 Nissan Serena e-Power XV (GC28, Japan)

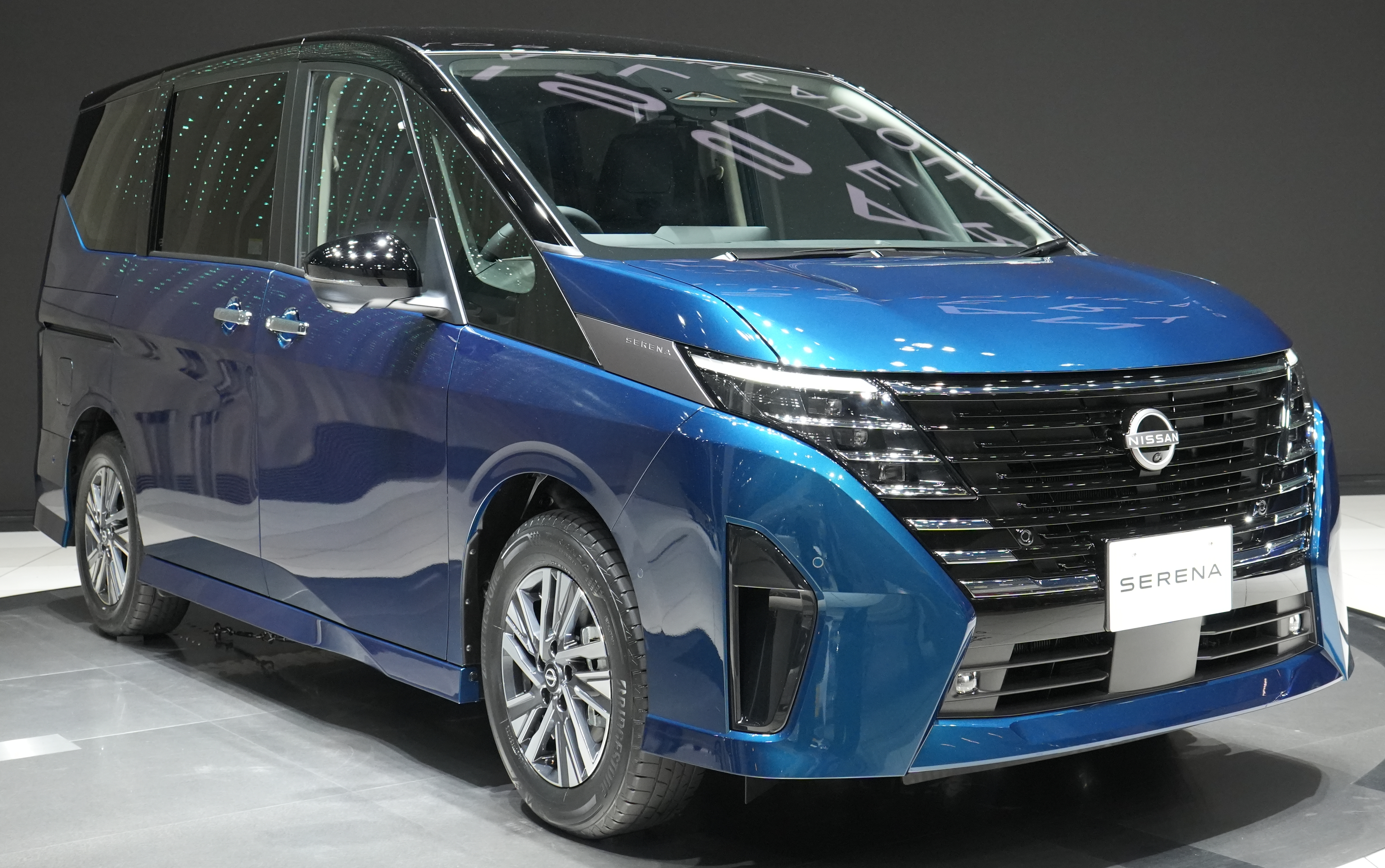
2022 Nissan Serena e-Power Luxion (GFC28, Japan)

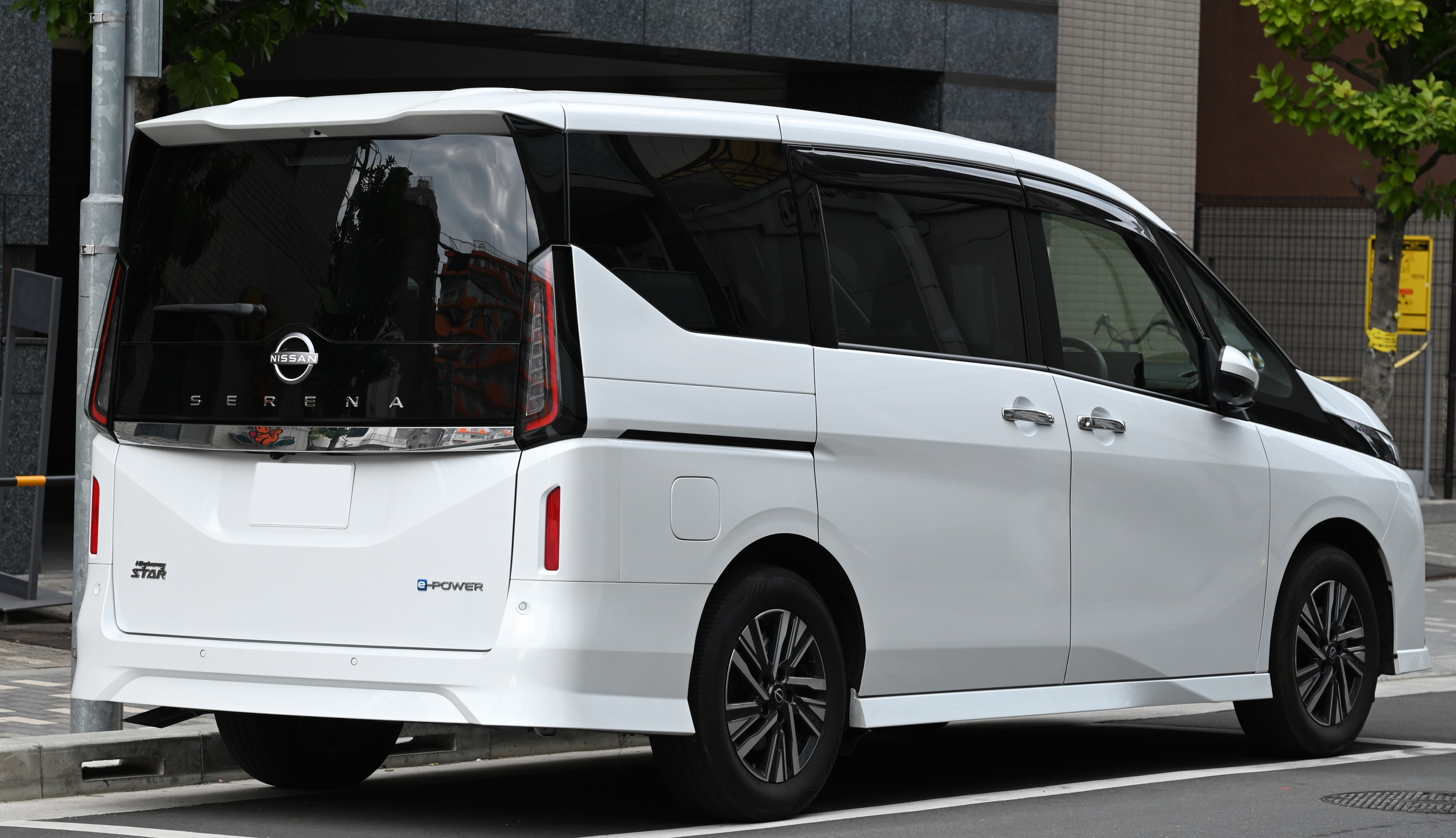
2022 Nissan Serena e-Power Highway Star V (GFC28, Japan)

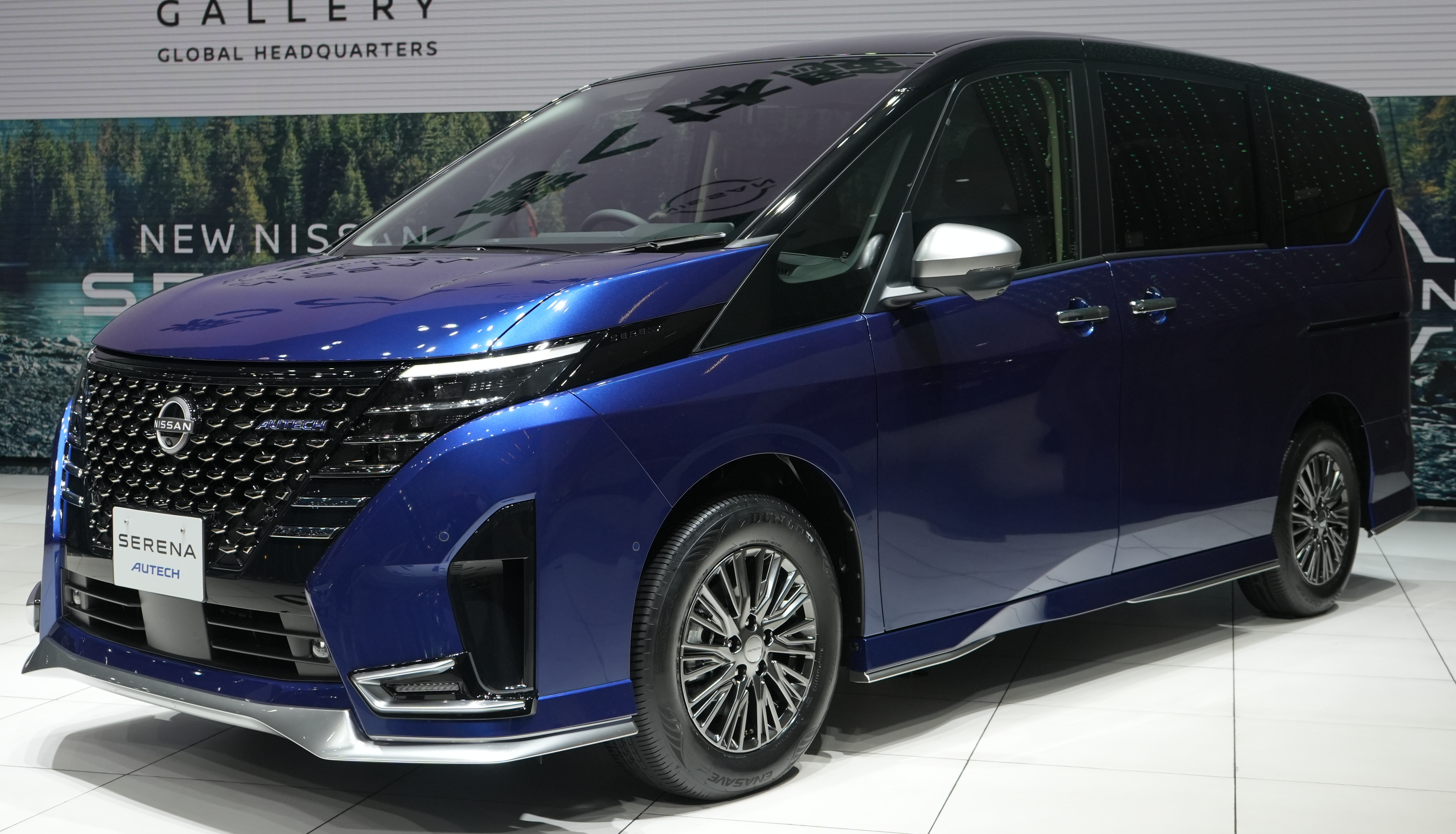
2022 Nissan Serena e-Power Autech (GFC28, Japan)

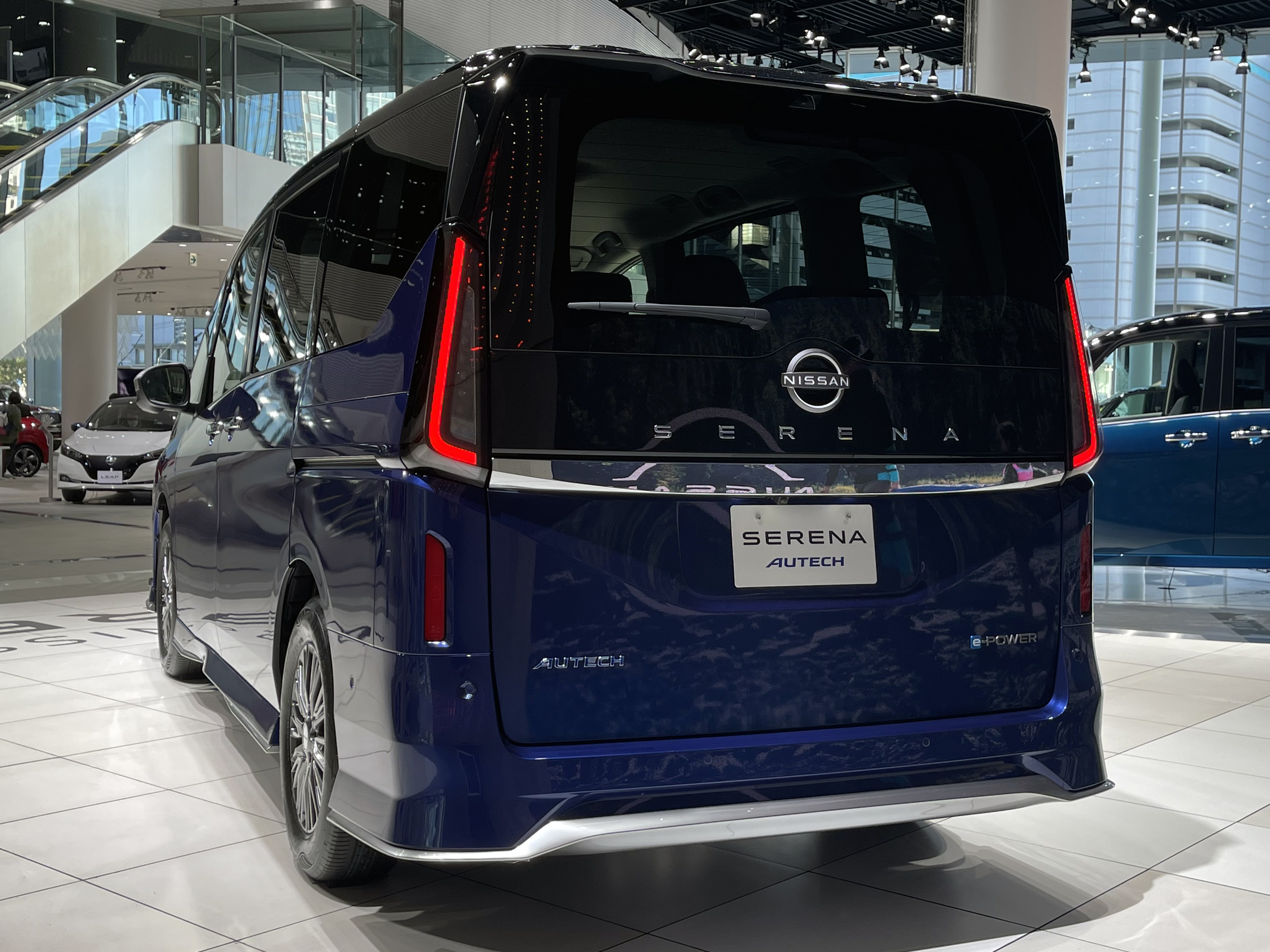
2022 Nissan Serena e-Power Autech (GFC28, Japan)

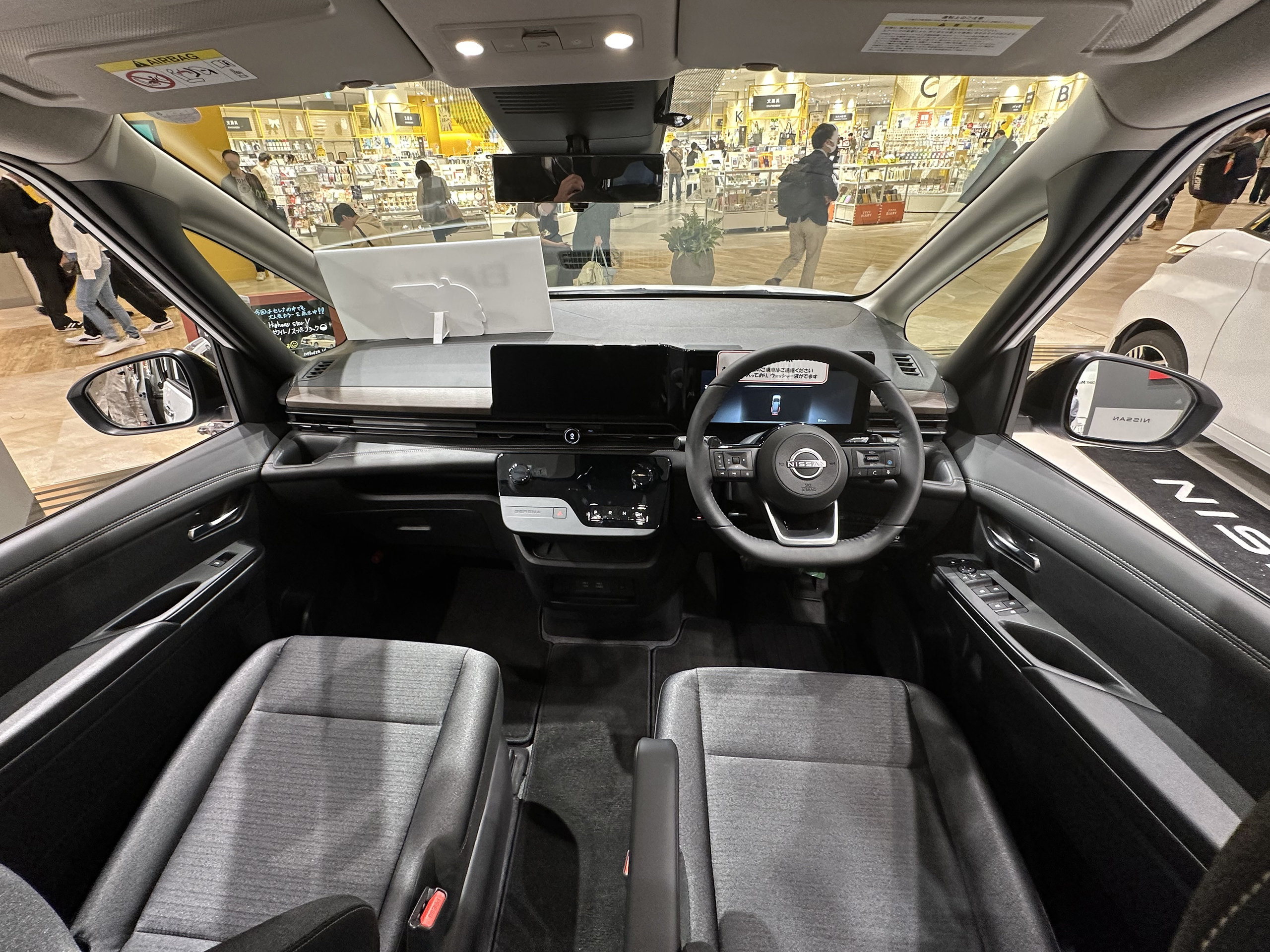
Interior

=== Specifications ===
In Japan, the sixth-generation Serena is offered in four grades levels; X, XV, Highway Star V and Luxion. Two engine options were available; the carried-over 2.0-litre MR20DD petrol, and the newly developed 1.4-litre HR14DDe e-Power. Seating capacity can be configured in either a 7- or 8-seater.

While the X, XV and Highway Star V were returning grades from the previous generation, the Luxion grade was new for the sixth-generation. Based on the Highway Star V and only available as a 7-seater e-Power model, the Luxion is equipped with Nissan's ProPILOT 2.0 technology system, which features hands-free driving during highway speeds of 40 km/h (25 mph) or above. Other grades outside the Luxion were equipped with the older ProPILOT system.

While e-Power models were initially front-wheel-drive at launch, an optional “e-4ORCE” four-wheel-drive option became available since October 2024 for all grades except the Luxion.

=== Facelift (2026) ===
The Serena received a facelift unveiled on 18 December 2025 and launched in Japan in February 2026, featuring a redesigned front fascia with an asymmetrical V-pattern grille, revised headlamps and alloy wheels, plus Google-based NissanConnect infotainment and an enhanced Intelligent Around View Monitor. The Highway Star V Black Edition grade was added on 5 November 2026, to commemorate the 35th Annivesary Serena nameplate.

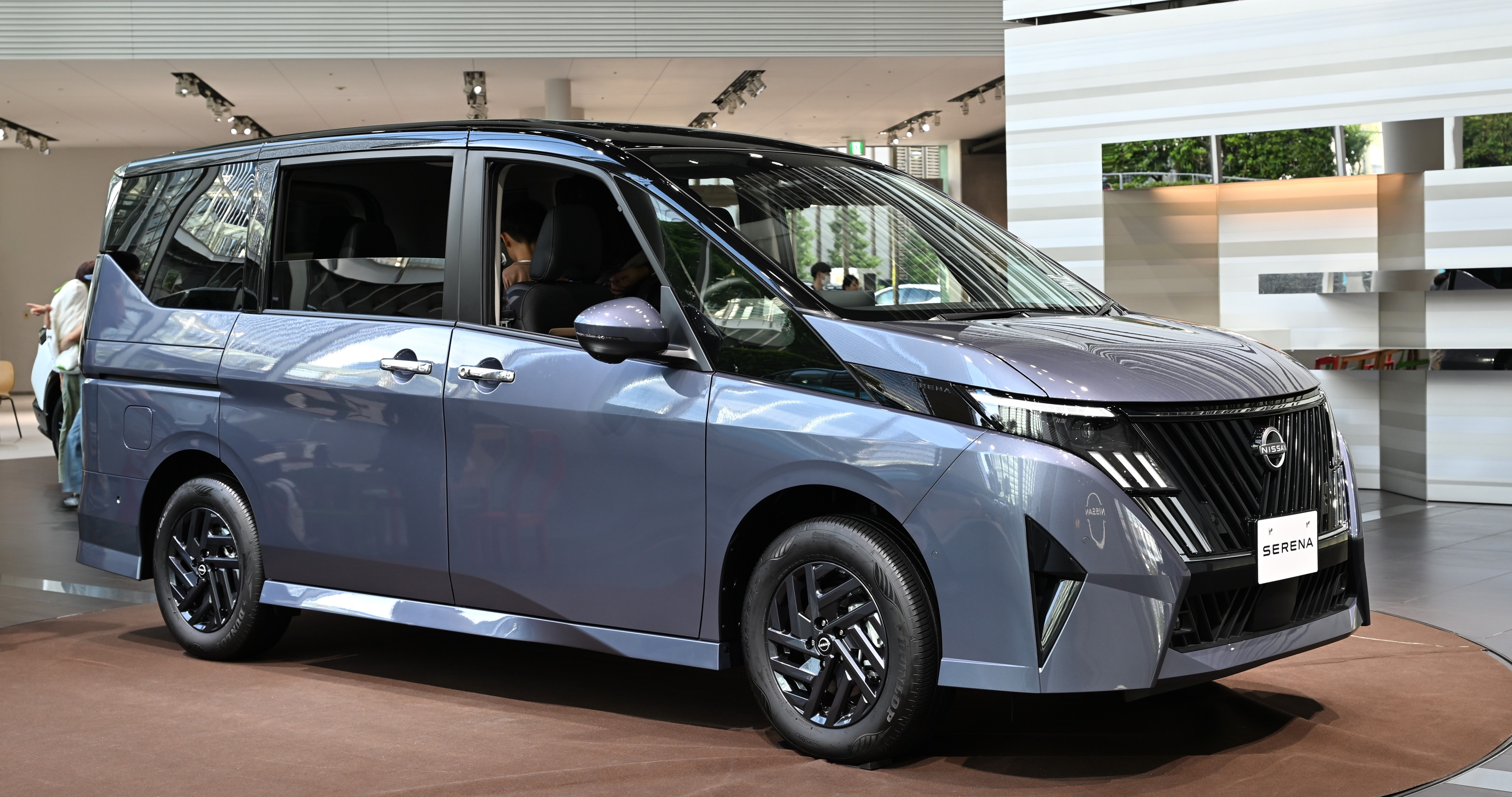
2026 Nissan Serena Highway Star V (facelift)

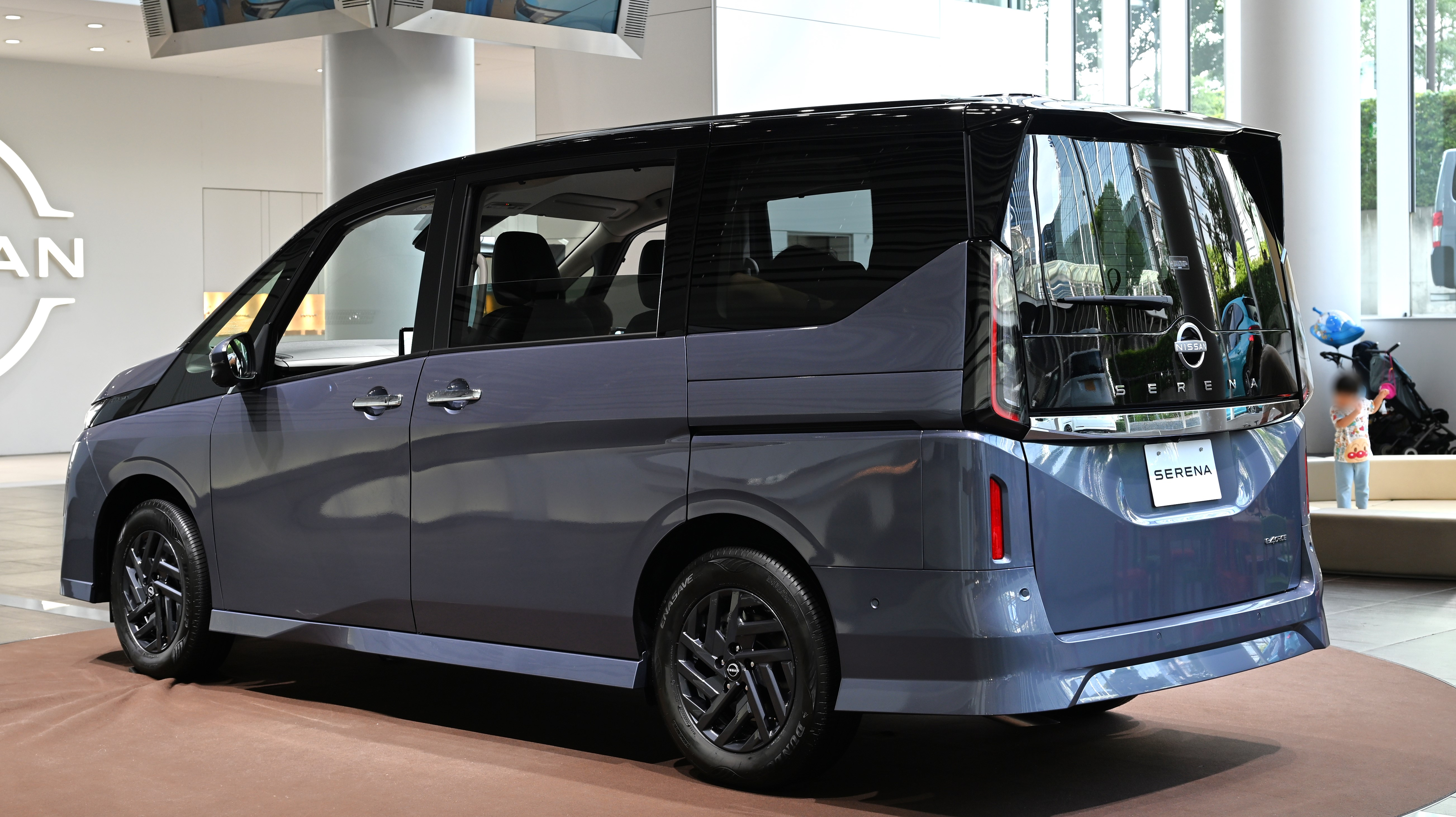
2026 Nissan Serena Highway Star V (facelift)

=== Export markets ===
==== Indonesia ====
The sixth-generation Serena was launched for the Indonesian market in July 2024 at the 31st Gaikindo Indonesia International Auto Show. A Japanese Luxion model was previously showcased in August 2023 at the previous year's GIIAS to mark its initial Indonesian debut. It is offered with the sole variant returning from the previous generation; Highway Star. For the sixth-generation, the Indonesian market Serena is only available with the e-Power series hybrid powertrain.

==== Malaysia ====
The sixth-generation Serena was previewed in Malaysia in December 2025, and later launched on 3 March 2026. In Malaysia, it is available with five variants: X, X Plus, Highway Star, Premium Highway Star, and Shiro Premium Highway Star, all variants are only available with the e-Power series hybrid powertrain.

==== Singapore ====
The sixth-generation Serena was previewed at the Singapore Motorshow on 17 January 2024, and was later launched on 13 May 2024. In Singapore, it is available with either the Premium (8-seater) or Highway Star Prestige (7-seater) variants, both variants are only offered with the e-Power series hybrid powertrain. The facelifted Serena was launched in Singapore in 25 September 2026, in a sole Highway Star variant with either 8 seater or 7 seater option.

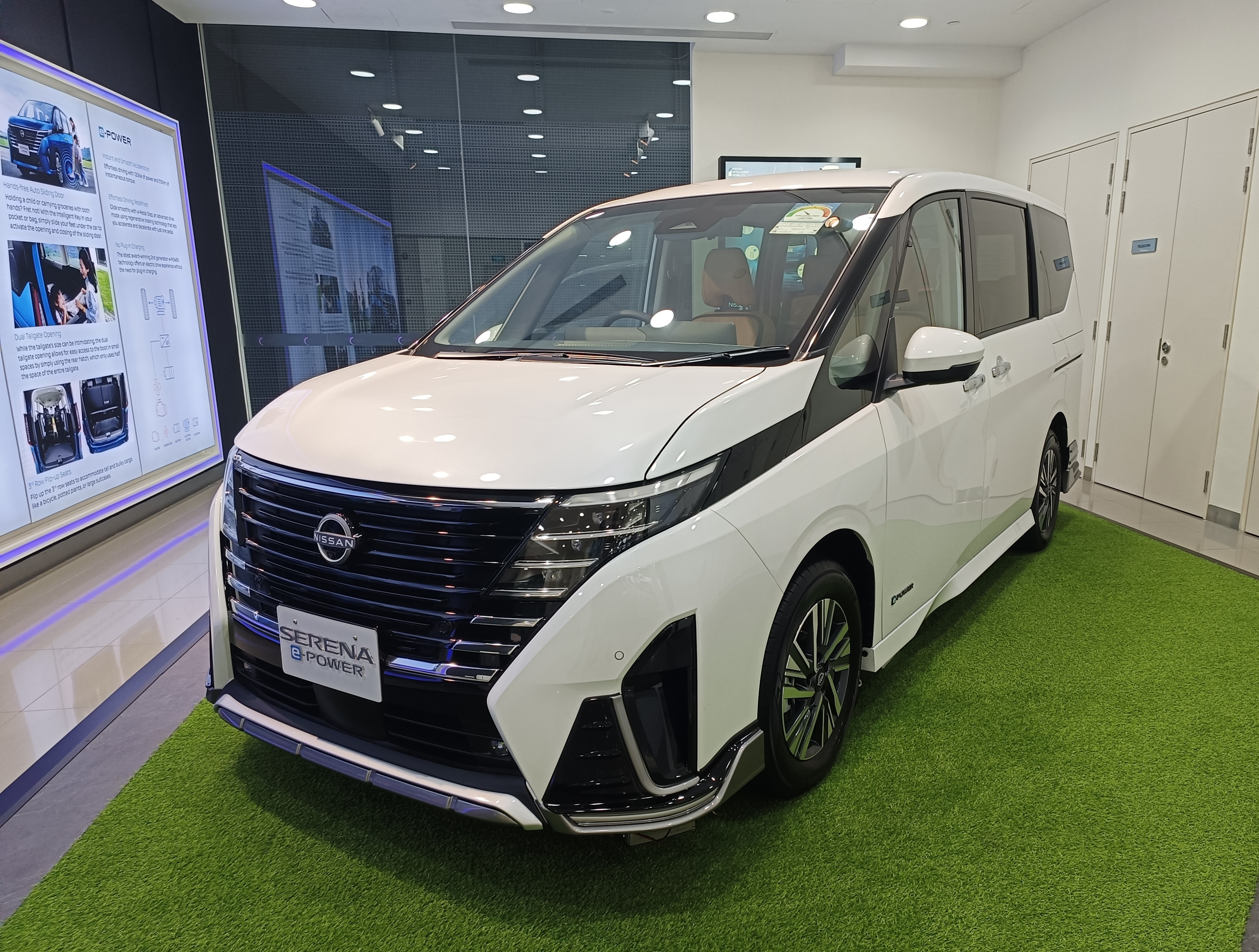
Nissan Serena E Power (Singapore)

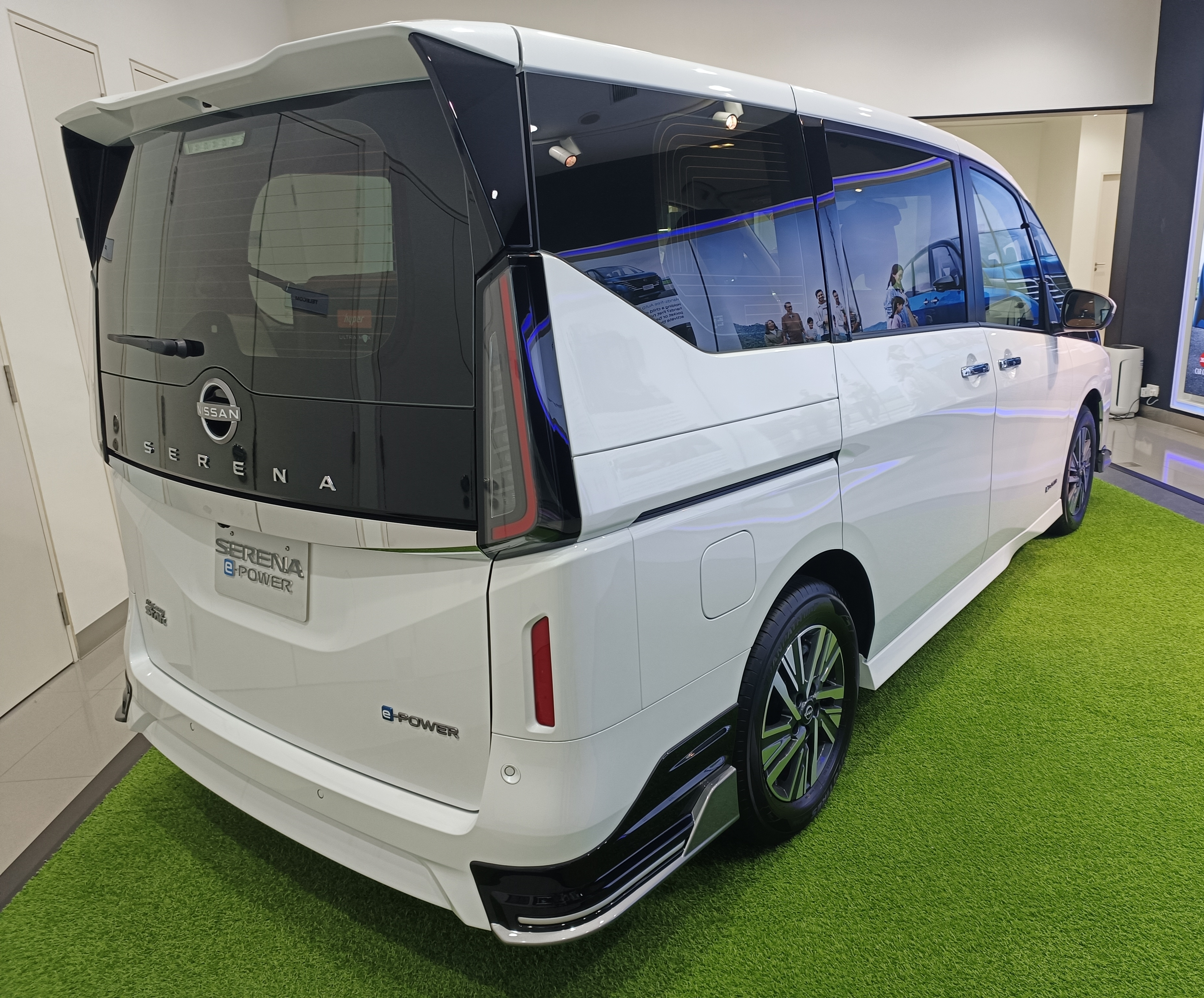
Nissan Serena E Power (Singapore)

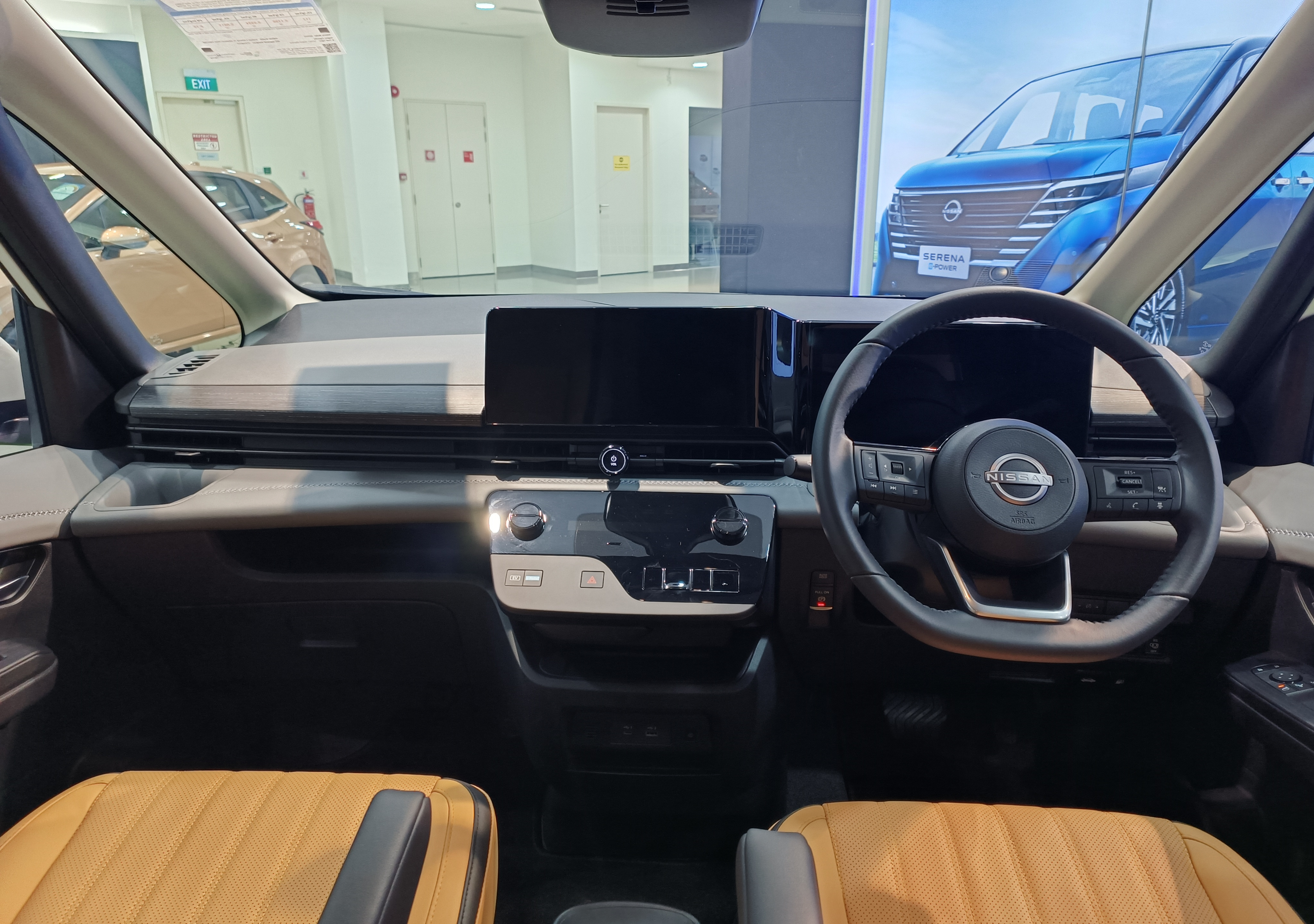
Interior (Singapore)

==== Thailand ====
The sixth-generation Serena was launched in Thailand on 24 March 2025. It is only offered with e-Power series hybrid powertrain, with the sole Highway Star 7-seater variant.

=== Awards ===
Nissan Serena won Technology Award at 2023-2024 Japan car of the year. Nissan has announced that the Serena minivan has been awarded the Technology Car of the Year at the 2023-2024 Japan Car of the Year awards.

== Sales ==
| Year | Japan | Indonesia | Malaysia (Note: Figures based on registration (Malaysia)) |
|---|---|---|---|
| 1996 | | 327 | |
| 1997 | | 153 | |
| 1998 | | 95 | |
| 1999 | 45,177 | 145 | |
| 2000 | 64,093 | — (Note: Official sales were halted due to the impact of the 1998 economic crisis and a strategic hiatus before the second-generation (C24) local launch in 2004.) | 1,682 |
| 2001 | 54,220 | — | 1,292 |
| 2002 | 60,492 | — | 660 |
| 2003 | 47,400 | — | 387 |
| 2004 | 40,760 | 1,884 | 362 |
| 2005 | 69,973 | 1,749 | 1,048 |
| 2006 | 80,901 | 779 | 634 |
| 2007 | 77,544 | 1,279 | 434 |
| 2008 | 72,927 | 1,710 | 422 |
| 2009 | 78,836 | 2,116 | 320 |
| 2010 | 75,040 | 3,166 | 449 |
| 2011 | 84,359 | 2,175 | 361 |
| 2012 | 96,020 | 2,304 | 347 |
| 2013 | 96,407 | 4,008 | 2,163 |
| 2014 | 76,909 | 1,712 | 2,429 |
| 2015 | 61,796 | 1,661 | 2,652 |
| 2016 | 73,502 | 0 | 2,706 |
| 2017 | 84,433 | 1,305 | 2,722 |
| 2018 | 99,865 | 572 | 5,846 |
| 2019 | 92,956 | 964 | 5,740 |
| 2020 | 68,648 | 577 | 4,663 |
| 2021 | 58,954 | 74 | 2,554 |
| 2022 | 57,513 | 333 | 3,250 |
| 2023 | 75,673 | 428 | 3,838 |
| 2024 | 80,899 | 909 | 3,011 |
| 2025 | 71,465 | 586 | 2,751 |
