= 2018 in music =

This topic covers notable events and articles related to 2018 in music.

== Specific locations ==
- African
- American
- Asian
  - Chinese
  - Japanese
  - Philippine
  - South Korean
- Canadian
- European
  - British
  - Scandinavian
    - Danish
    - Finnish
    - Icelandic
    - Norwegian
    - Swedish
- Latin

== Specific genres ==
- Classical
- Country
- Heavy metal
- Hip-hop
- Electronic
- Jazz
- Latin
- New Wave
- Opera
- Pop
- Punk
- Progressive rock
- Rock
- R&B
- World music
- K-pop
- J-pop

== Awards ==
60th Annual Grammy Awards
Record of the Year: 24K Magic by Bruno Mars • Album of the Year: 24K Magic by Bruno Mars • Song of the Year: "That's What I Like" by Bruno Mars • Best New Artist: Alessia Cara
2018 Billboard Music Awards
Top Artist: Ed Sheeran • Top Male Artist: Ed Sheeran • Top Female Artist: Taylor Swift • Top Duo/Group: Imagine Dragons • Top New Artist: Khalid • Top Billboard 200 Album: Damn by Kendrick Lamar • Top Hot 100 Song: "Despacito" by Luis Fonsi and Daddy Yankee featuring Justin Bieber
2018 ARIA Music Awards
Album of the Year: Love Monster by Amy Shark • Song of the Year: "Youngblood" by 5 Seconds of Summer • Breakthrough Artist: Dazed & Confused by Ruel
2018 Brit Awards
British Album of the Year: Gang Signs & Prayer by Stormzy • British Single of the Year: "Human" by Rag'n'Bone Man • British Breakthrough Act: Dua Lipa • British Video: "Sign of the Times" by Harry Styles
Eurovision Song Contest 2018
"Toy" by Netta (Israel)
2018 Juno Awards
Artist of the Year: Gord Downie • Group of the Year: A Tribe Called Red • Album of the Year: Everything Now by Arcade Fire • Single of the Year: "There's Nothing Holdin' Me Back" by Shawn Mendes
2018 Mnet Asian Music Awards
Artist of the Year: BTS • Album of the Year: Love Yourself: Tear by BTS • Song of the Year: "What Is Love" by Twice • Best Music Video: "Idol" by BTS
2018 MTV Video Music Awards
Video of the Year: "Havana" by Camila Cabello featuring Young Thug • Song of the Year: Rockstar by Post Malone (featuring 21 Savage) • Artist of the Year: Camila Cabello • Best New Artist: Cardi B • Best Collaboration: Dinero by Jennifer Lopez (featuring DJ Khaled and Cardi B)
2018 MTV Europe Music Awards
Best Song: "Havana" by Camila Cabello featuring Young Thug • Best Video: "Havana" by Camila Cabello featuring Young Thug) • Best Artist: Camila Cabello • Best Group: BTS • Best New: Cardi B
American Music Awards of 2018 (USA)
Artist of the Year: Taylor Swift • New Artist of the Year: Camila Cabello • Collaboration of the Year: "Havana" by Camila Cabello featuring Young Thug • Tour of the Year: Reputation Stadium Tour by Taylor Swift
Rock and Roll Hall of Fame
Inductees: Bon Jovi • The Cars • Dire Straits • The Moody Blues • Nina Simone
27th Seoul Music Awards (South Korea)
Grand Prize: BTS • Best Song: "Like It" by Yoon Jong-shin • Best Album: Palette by IU • Best New Artist: Pristin, Chungha, Wanna One

== Bands formed ==
- AKB48 Team SH
- AKB48 Team TP
- Ateez
- Big Red Machine
- Black Country, New Road
- Black Smoke Trigger
- Boygenius
- The Carters
- Courting
- D-Crunch
- dps
- DreamNote
- The Driver Era
- Empire
- Error
- Fanatics - Flavor
- Fantastics from Exile Tribe
- Fievel Is Glauque
- First Place
- Forestella
- Fromis 9
- (G)I-dle
- Girlkind
- Gugudan SeMiNa
- GWSN
- Hachimitsu Rocket
- The Haunt
- Honey Popcorn
- Hotline TNT
- Iz*One
- JBJ95
- Kids See Ghosts
- King & Prince
- LA LOM
- The Linda Lindas
- Loona
- LSD
- Maverick City Music
- Maywish
- Mirror
- MNL48
- Nature
- NeonPunch
- NEX7
- Nick Mason's Saucerful of Secrets
- Nine Percent
- Noir
- NTB
- Oceanhoarse
- Oh!GG
- Pattern-Seeking Animals
- Pristin V
- Raise A Suilen
- Rocket Girls 101
- Saturday
- SGO48
- Silk City
- Spectrum
- Spira Spica
- Sprain
- STU48
- Target
- The Tubs
- Uijin
- UNB
- Uni.T
- W24
- We Girls
- WJMK
- Yoshimotozaka46

== Soloist debuts ==
- AC Bonifacio
- Aina the End
- Aitch
- Aitana
- Akari Nanawo
- Alec Benjamin
- Alfred García
- Alfie Templeman
- Ali Gatie
- Amaia
- Ana Guerra
- Angelo Acosta
- Arlo Parks
- Ash Island
- Ashnikko
- Ava Max
- Beabadoobee
- Bibi
- Cheronna Ng
- Chiaki Ito
- Chiaki Satō
- Conan Gray
- Doja Cat
- Elkie
- Girl in Red
- Giveon
- Halca
- Haruka Yamazaki
- Haon
- Holland
- Hoya
- Hynn
- Janine Berdin
- Jennie
- Jen Ledger
- J-Hope
- Jin Longguo
- Jung Il-hoon
- Karencitta
- Kaori Ishihara
- Katie
- Keekihime
- Key
- The Kid Laroi
- Kiyoe Yoshioka
- Kim Dong-han
- King Princess
- Kira Chan
- Kyline Alcantara
- Lee Chang-sub
- Lele Pons
- Leo
- Lil Mosey
- Lizzy McAlpine
- Lola Indigo
- Loren Gray
- Mae Muller
- Mai Fuchigami
- Makoto Furukawa
- Mariah Angeliq
- Meimi Tamura
- Memphiis
- Minori Suzuki
- Mino
- Misako Uno
- Moonbyul
- Niki DeMar
- Onew
- Reona
- Rika Tachibana
- Rina Balaj
- Ryuji Imaichi
- Ryucheru
- Ryusei Yokohama
- Salem Ilese
- Shanti Dope
- Shigeru Joshima
- Shuta Sueyoshi
- Sohee
- Sori
- Son Dong-woon
- Sooyoung
- Taiki Yamazaki
- Tayna
- Tems
- Twlv
- Unique
- Vinxen
- Wheein
- Yoo Seon-ho
- Youra
- Yuka Ozaki
- Yuma Uchida
- Yubin
- Yuri

== Bands reformed ==
- B2K
- BBMak
- The Distillers
- The Ghost inside
- Hootie & The Blowfish
- HotCha
- Late of the Pier
- The Kinks
- Mötley Crüe
- Pussycat Dolls
- The Raconteurs
- Soft Cell
- Spice Girls
- Static-X
- Swedish House Mafia
- Utopia
- Westlife

== Bands on hiatus ==
- Charisma.com
- The Color Morale
- Dark Sermon
- Devin Townsend Project
- Fifth Harmony
- Folks
- fun.
- Heart
- Hedley
- Katatonia
- Karnataka
- Moose Blood
- One Direction
- PWR BTTM
- Rice
- Sads
- Slipknot
- Sorority Noise

== Bands disbanded ==
- 7 Seconds
- Alcazar
- at17
- At the Drive-In
- Aqua Timez
- Babyraids Japan
- Balance and Composure
- Bestie
- Big Bang
- Brand New
- The Charm the Fury
- Chatmonchy
- Cheeky Parade
- Chelsy
- Ciao Bella Cinquetti
- D12
- Dirge Within
- The Fall
- Frightened Rabbit
- GEM
- GMS
- Hedley
- Idol Renaissance
- La PomPon
- LFO
- Mastersystem
- Minus the Bear
- The Orwells
- Owl John
- Passpo
- The Pizza Underground
- Royal Headache
- Runrig
- Rush
- Say Anything
- Seventeen
- Slaughterhouse
- Sleeping Giant
- Soundgarden
- Splashh
- The Strypes
- Tackey & Tsubasa
- Them Are Us Too
- The Thermals
- Ultimate Painting
- Vattnet
- Vallenfyre
- Vanilla Beans
- Wild Beasts
- X21
- Young and in the Way

== Deaths ==
=== January ===
- 1
  - Jon Paul Steuer, 33, American punk singer and actor
  - Betty Willis, 76, American R&B singer
- 2 – Rick Hall, 85, American record producer
- 3 – Josiah Boyd, 32, American heavy metal bassist (A Hill to Die Upon)
- 4 – Ray Thomas, 76, British progressive rock flautist (The Moody Blues)
- 5 – Mikio Fujioka, 36, Japanese heavy metal guitarist (Babymetal)
- 7
  - France Gall, 70, French pop singer
  - Buster Stiggs, 63, British-born New Zealand punk drummer (Suburban Reptiles, The Swingers, Models)
- 8 – Denise LaSalle, 83, American blues and R&B singer-songwriter
- 9 – Paul Antingnani, American heavy metal drummer (Sworn Enemy)
- 10 – "Fast" Eddie Clarke, 67, British heavy metal guitarist (Motörhead, Fastway)
- 12 – Pierre Pincemaille, 61, French classical organist
- 13 – Tzimis Panousis, 63, Greek comedy singer
- 15
  - Edwin Hawkins, 74, American gospel singer, songwriter and pianist
  - Dolores O'Riordan, 46, Irish alternative rock singer-songwriter (The Cranberries)
  - MBrother, 36, Polish DJ and music producer
- 16
  - Dave Holland, 69, English heavy metal drummer (Judas Priest, Trapeze)
  - Madalena Iglésias, 78, Portuguese classic pop singer
- 17 – Ric Jacobs, 61, American pop-rock singer (Steel Breeze)
- 18 – Steve Nisbett, 69, Nevisian-born British reggae drummer (Steel Pulse)
- 19 – Fredo Santana, 27, American rapper
- 20
  - Terry Evans, 70, American blues singer and guitarist
  - Mario Guccio, 64, Belgian rock singer (Machiavel)
  - Jim Rodford, 76, British rock bassist (Argent, The Kinks, The Zombies)
- 22 – Preston Shannon, 70, American blues singer and guitarist
- 23
  - Hugh Masekela, 78, South African jazz trumpeter
  - Lari White, 52, American country music singer
- 24 – Mark E. Smith, 60, British post-punk singer-songwriter (The Fall)
- 25
  - Tommy Banks, 81, Canadian jazz pianist
  - Steve Foster, Australian folk singer
  - Floyd Miles, 74, American blues singer and guitarist
- 26
  - Buzz Clifford, 76, American pop singer
  - Igor Zhukov, 81, Russian classical pianist
- 27 – Grant Fell, 56, New Zealand industrial rock bassist (Headless Chickens)
- 28 – Neil Harris, 63, British punk guitarist (Sham 69)
- 28
  - Eddie Shaw, 80, American blues saxophonist
  - Coco Schumann, 93, German jazz guitarist
- 31
  - Del Delker, 93, American gospel singer
  - Leah LaBelle, 31, Canadian-born American R&B singer

=== February ===
- – Rick Evans (75), American musician (Zager and Evans)
- 1
  - Dennis Edwards, 74, American R&B singer (The Temptations)
  - Mowzey Radio, 33, Ugandan pop singer (Goodlyfe Crew)
- 3 – Leon "Ndugu" Chancler, 65, American jazz and rock drummer
- 5 – Zeno Roth, 51, German rock guitarist
- 7
  - John Perry Barlow, 70, American rock songwriter (Grateful Dead)
  - Mickey Jones, 76, American country-rock drummer (Kenny Rogers and The First Edition)
  - Pat Torpey, 64, American hard rock drummer (Mr. Big)
- 8
  - Algia Mae Hinton, 88, American blues singer
  - Lovebug Starski, 57, American rapper
  - Ebony Reigns, 20, Ghanaian dancehall singer
- 9
  - Jóhann Jóhannsson, 48, Icelandic film composer
  - Craig MacGregor, 68, American rock bassist (Foghat)
- 11
  - Vic Damone, 89, American pop singer
  - Tom Rapp, 70, American psychedelic rock singer (Pearls Before Swine)
- 12
  - Daryle Singletary, 46, American country singer
  - Klaasje van der Wal, 69, Dutch hard rock bassist (Shocking Blue)
- 13
  - Scott Boyer, 70, American rock singer and guitarist (Cowboy, The 31st of February)
  - Billy Johnson, American emo and noise rock drummer (Reggie and the Full Effect, Rocket Fuel Is The Key)
- 14 – Nuray Hafiftaş, 53, Turkish folk singer
- 16 – Barbara Alston, 74, American R&B singer (The Crystals)
- 19
  - Johnny Mosby, 88, American country music singer (Johnny & Jonie Mosby)
  - Norm Rogers, 61, American alternative country drummer (The Jayhawks, Cows)
  - Stormin MC, 34, British grime rapper
- 22 – Errol Buddle, 89, Australian jazz bassoonist and saxophonist
- 23 – Eddy Amoo, 73, British soul singer (The Real Thing)
- 24 – Bud Luckey, 83, American voice actor and singer

=== March ===
- 1 – Bill Burkette, 75, American pop singer (The Vogues)
- 2
  - Jesus Lopez Cobos, 78, Spanish classic music conductor
  - Brandon Jenkins, 48, American Red Dirt country singer-songwriter
  - Van McLain, 62, American rock guitarist and singer (Shooting Star)
- 3
  - Patrick Doyle, 31, British indie rock drummer (Veronica Falls)
  - Kenneth Gärdestad, 69, Swedish pop songwriter
- 7 – Jerzy Milian, 82, Polish jazz vibraphonist
- 9 – Pyarelal Wadali, 75, Indian Sufi folk singer (Wadali Brothers)
- 11 – Ken Dodd, 90, British comedian and pop singer
- 12
  - Nokie Edwards, 82, American surf rock guitarist (The Ventures)
  - Craig Mack, 47, American rapper
- 13
  - Claudia Fontaine, 57, British pop and ska singer (Afrodiziak)
  - Jimmy Wisner, 86, American pianist, arranger, songwriter
- 14
  - Steve Mandell, 76, American bluegrass guitarist and banjoist
  - Liam O'Flynn, 72, Irish uilleann piper
  - Charlie Quintana, 56, American punk rock drummer (The Plugz, Cracker, Social Distortion, Agent Orange)
- 16
  - Laurence Cleary, 60, Irish new wave guitarist (The Blades)
  - Buell Neidlinger, 82, American jazz bassist and cellist
- 18 – Killjoy, 48, American death metal singer (Necrophagia, Viking Crown)
- 20 – Peter "Mars" Cowling, 72, British blues rock bassist (Pat Travers Band, The Flying Hat Band, Gnidrolog)
- 22 – Morgana King, 87, American jazz singer
- 24 – Lys Assia, 94, Swiss pop singer
- 25 – Seo Min-woo, 33, South Korean pop singer (100%)
- 27 – Kenny O'Dell, 73, American country singer-songwriter
- 28
  - Lívia Rév, 101, Hungarian classical pianist
  - Caleb Scofield, 39, American alternative rock and sludge metal bassist and singer (Cave In, Zozobra, Old Man Gloom)
- 30
  - Alias, 41, American rapper and producer
  - Sabahudin Kurt, 82, Bosnian folk singer
  - Major Short, 93, American double bass player (Somethin' Smith and the Redheads)
- 31 – Frode Viken, 63, Norwegian rock guitarist (D.D.E.)

=== April ===
- 1
  - Audrey Morris, 89, American jazz singer
  - Ron Shaw, 77, American folk singer, guitarist and banjoist (The Hillside Singers)
- 3 – Lill-Babs, 80, Swedish pop singer
- 4 – Don Cherry, 94, American pop singer
- 5 – Cecil Taylor, 89, American jazz pianist
- 6 – Jacques Higelin, 77, French chanson singer
- 8 – Nathan Davis, 81, American jazz multi-instrumentalist
- 9 – Timmy Matley, 36, Irish pop singer (The Overtones)
- 10 – Yvonne Staples, 80, American soul singer (The Staple Singers)
- 14 – Milan Škampa, 89, Czech classical violist (Smetana Quartet)
- 16 – Dona Ivone Lara, 97, Brazilian samba singer
- 17
  - Randy Scruggs, 64, American country guitarist and songwriter
  - Big Tom, 81, Irish country singer
- 19
  - Stuart Colman, 73, English musician (Pinkerton's Assorted Colours, The Flying Machine), record producer (Shakin' Stevens), and broadcaster
  - Reginald McArthur, 63, American R&B singer (The Controllers)
- 20
  - Avicii, 28, Swedish EDM DJ and producer
  - Brian Henry Hooper, 55, Australian alternative rock guitarist (Beasts of Bourbon, Kim Salmon and the Surrealists)
- 23 – Bob Dorough, 94, American jazz singer and pianist
- 24 – Paul Gray, 54, Australian new wave singer, songwriter and keyboardist (Wa Wa Nee)
- 26 – Charles Neville, 79, American R&B saxophonist (The Neville Brothers)
- 29
  - Ted Devoux, 55, American rapper (Boo-Yaa T.R.I.B.E.)
  - Rose Laurens, 65, French pop singer-songwriter
- 30 – Tim Calvert, 52, American heavy metal guitarist (Nevermore, Forbidden)

=== May ===
- 1
  - John "Jabo" Starks, 80, American funk and R&B drummer (The J.B.'s)
  - Wanda Wiłkomirska, 89, Polish classical violinist
- 2 – Tony Cucchiara, 80, Italian folk singer
- 4
  - Steve Coy, 56, British new wave drummer (Dead or Alive)
  - Tony Kinman, American cowpunk singer and bassist (Rank and File, The Dils)
  - Abi Ofarim, 80, Israeli pop singer
- 5 – Dick Williams, 91, American pop singer (The Williams Brothers)
- 7
  - Gayle Shepherd, 81, American pop singer (Shepherd Sisters)
  - Roman Toi, 101, Estonian-born Canadian composer, choir conductor, and organist
- 9
  - Sammy Allred, 84, American country music singer and mandolinist (The Geezinslaw Brothers)
  - Ben Graves, 46, American horror punk drummer (Murderdolls)
  - Carl Perkins, 59, New Zealand reggae singer (House of Shem)
  - Shirley Thomas, 74, American pop singer (The Dixiebelles)
- 10 – Scott Hutchison, 36, British indie singer, songwriter and guitarist (Frightened Rabbit, The Fruit Tree Foundation, Mastersystem)
- 11 – Matt Marks, 38, American contemporary classical multi-instrumentalist (Alarm Will Sound)
- 13 – Glenn Branca, 69, American avant-garde composer and guitarist (Theoretical Girls)
- 16 – Hideki Saijo, 63, Japanese pop singer
- 17
  - Jürgen Marcus, 69, German schlager singer
  - Jon Sholle, 70, American jazz, roots music and blues multi-instrumentalist
- 19
  - Reggie Lucas, 65, American multi-genre guitarist (Mtume), producer and songwriter
  - Patricia Morison, 103, American showtunes singer and actress
- 25 – Piet Kee, 90, Dutch classical organist
- 27 – Andy MacQueen, Australian punk guitarist (Exploding White Mice)
- 28
  - Evio Di Marzo, 64, Venezuelan tropical singer and guitarist (Adrenalina Caribe)
  - Stewart Lupton, 43, American indie rock singer (Jonathan Fire*Eater)
  - Josh Martin, 46, American grindcore guitarist (Anal Cunt)
- 31 – Demba Nabé, 46, German dancehall rapper (Seeed)

=== June ===
- 1
  - Andrew Massey, 72, British classical conductor
  - Sinan Sakić, 61, Serbian turbo-folk singer (Južni Vetar)
- 2 – Wayne Secrest, 68, American bassist (Confederate Railroad)
- 3 – Clarence Fountain, 88, American gospel singer (The Blind Boys of Alabama)
- 4 – Jalal Mansur Nuriddin, 73, American spoken word poet (The Last Poets)
- 5
  - Jimmy Gonzalez, 67, American Tejano singer (Mazz)
  - Ralph Santolla, 51, American metal guitarist (Deicide, Obituary, Iced Earth)
- 6 – Teddy Johnson, 98, British pop singer (Pearl Carr & Teddy Johnson)
- 7 – Al Capps, 79, American arranger, composer and record producer
- 8 – Danny Kirwan, 68, British rock and blues guitarist (Fleetwood Mac)
- 9 – John McElrath, 77, American rock singer and keyboardist (The Swingin' Medallions)
- 10
  - Neal E. Boyd, 42, American operatic pop singer
  - Ras Kimono, 60, Nigerian reggae singer
- 11 – Wayne Dockery, 76, American jazz bassist
- 12 – Jon Hiseman, 73, British jazz fusion and blues drummer (Colosseum, Colosseum II, John Mayall & the Bluesbreakers)
- 13 – D. J. Fontana, 87, American rock and roll drummer (The Blue Moon Boys)
- 15
  - Delia Bell, 83, American bluegrass singer (Bill Grant and Delia Bell)
  - Nick Knox, 60, American psychobilly drummer (The Cramps, Electric Eels)
  - Matt Murphy, 88, American blues guitarist (The Blues Brothers)
- 16 – Rebecca Parris, 66, American jazz singer
- 18
  - Jimmy Wopo, 21, American rapper
  - XXXTentacion, 20, American rapper
- 19
  - Bansi Quinteros, 41, Spanish psychedelic trance keyboardist (GMS)
  - Lowrell Simon, 75, American singer (The Lost Generation)
- 21 – David Corcoran, 64, American rock drummer (Duke Jupiter)
- 22
  - Geoffrey Oryema, 65, Ugandan afro-pop singer and guitarist
  - Vinnie Paul, 54, American metal drummer (Pantera, Damageplan, Hellyeah)
- 24
  - George Cameron, 70, American baroque pop drummer (The Left Banke)
  - Dan Ingram, 83, radio DJ
- 26
  - Fedor Frešo, 71, Slovak rock bassist (The Soulmen, Prúdy)
  - Ed Simons, 101, American classical music conductor
- 27 – Steve Soto, 54, American punk rock bassist (Adolescents, Agent Orange, Manic Hispanic)
- 29 – Eugene Pitt, 80, American doo wop singer (The Jive Five)
- 30
  - Smoke Dawg, 21, Canadian rapper, singer, and songwriter (Halal Gang)
  - Dean Webb, 81, American bluegrass mandolinist (The Dillards)

=== July ===
- 2
  - Henry Butler, 69, American jazz pianist
  - Alan Longmuir, 70, Scottish pop bassist (Bay City Rollers)
  - Bill Watrous, 79, American jazz trombonist
- 3 – Richard Swift, 41, American singer-songwriter and multi-instrumentalist (The Shins, The Arcs, Starflyer 59)
- 4 – Carmen Campagne, 58, Canadian folk singer
- 6
  - Vlatko Ilievski, 33, Macedonian rock singer and guitarist
  - Vince Martin, 81, American folk singer
- 7
  - Brett Hoffmann, 51, American death metal singer (Malevolent Creation)
  - Garry Lowe, 65, Jamaican-born Canadian reggae and blues rock musician (Big Sugar)
- 8 – Tab Hunter, 86, American pop singer
- 9 – Stefan Demert, 78, Swedish pop singer
- 10 – Ye Lwin, 70, Burmese rock guitarist
- 13 – K. Rani, 75, Indian playback singer
- 15 – Theryl DeClouet, 66, American jazz-funk and R&B singer (Galactic)
- 18 – Raivo Rätte, 48, Estonian alternative rock bassist (Kosmikud)
- 25 – Patrick Williams, 79, American composer, arranger and conductor
- 27 – Mark Shelton, 60, American heavy metal guitarist (Manilla Road)
- 28 – Olga Jackowska, 67, Polish rock singer (Maanam)
- 29
  - Sam Mehran, 31, British dance-punk singer and guitarist (Test Icicles)
  - Tomasz Stańko, 76, Polish jazz trumpeter and composer
- 31 – Irvin Jarrett, 69, Jamaican reggae percussionist (Inner Circle, Third World)

=== August ===
- 1
  - Ted LeGarde, 87, Australian country music singer and guitarist (The LeGarde Twins)
  - Celeste Rodrigues, 95, Portuguese fado singer
  - Umbayee, 67, Indian ghazal singer
- 2 – Neil Argo, 71, American film and television composer
- 3
  - Brad Daymond, 48, Canadian house DJ (Love Inc.)
  - Tommy Peoples, 70, Irish folk fiddler (The Bothy Band)
- 4 – Lorrie Collins, 76, American rockabilly singer and guitarist (The Collins Kids)
- 5
  - Majid Al-Majid, 52, Saudi folk singer
  - Ellen Joyce Loo, 32, Canadian-born Hong Kong folktronica singer and guitarist (at17)
- 8 – Linda Mkhize, 37, South African rapper
- 9 – Arthur Davies, 77, Welsh opera singer
- 10 – Jason "J-Sin" Luttrell, 40, American nu-metal vocalist (Primer 55)
- 14
  - Jill Janus, 42, American heavy metal singer (Huntress)
  - Valentina Levko, 92, Russian opera singer
  - Randy Rampage, 58, Canadian thrash metal and punk singer and bassist (Annihilator, D.O.A., Stress Factor 9)
- 16
  - Aretha Franklin, 76, American R&B and soul singer
  - Count Prince Miller, 84, Jamaican-born British singer (Jimmy James and the Vagabonds)
- 17
  - Claudio Lolli, 68, Italian pop singer
  - Danny Pearson, 65, American R&B singer
- 20
  - Jean Létourneau, 97, Canadian tenor, french hornist, music educator, choir and opera director.
  - Eddie Willis, 82, American soul and R&B guitarist (The Funk Brothers)
- 21 – Spencer P. Jones, 61, Australian punk singer and guitarist (The Johnnys, Beasts of Bourbon)
- 22
  - Ed King, 68, American rock guitarist (Strawberry Alarm Clock, Lynyrd Skynyrd)
  - Lazy Lester, 85, American blues singer and guitarist
- 24 – DJ Ready Red, 53, American hip hop DJ (Geto Boys)
- 25 – Kyle Pavone, 28, American metalcore singer (We Came as Romans)
- 26 – Inge Borkh, 97, German opera singer
- 29
  - Tony Camillo, 90, American record producer and arranger (Bazuka)
  - Ellie Mannette, 90, Trinidadian steelpan drummer
- 30 – Joseph Kobzon, 80, Russian pop singer

=== September ===
- 1 – Randy Weston, 92, American jazz pianist
- 2 – Conway Savage, 58, Australian alternative rock keyboardist (Nick Cave & The Bad Seeds)
- 4 – Don Gardner, 87, American R&B singer-songwriter
- 7
  - Don McGuire, 86, American pop singer (The Hilltoppers)
  - Mac Miller, 26, American rapper
- 8 – Chelsi Smith, 45, American pop singer
- 10
  - Paul Curcio, 74, American rock guitarist (The Mojo Men) and record producer (Kill 'Em All)
  - Johnny Strike, 70, American punk singer and guitarist (Crime)
- 12 – Rachid Taha, 59, Algerian rock singer (Carte de Séjour)
- 14 – Max Bennett, 90, American jazz and pop bassist (L.A. Express, The Wrecking Crew)
- 15 – Helen Clare, 101, British soprano singer
- 16
  - Maartin Allcock, 61, British folk multi-instrumentalist (Fairport Convention, Jethro Tull)
  - Big Jay McNeely, 91, American R&B saxophonist
- 18 – Wesley Tinglin, 75, Jamaican reggae singer (The Viceroys)
- 22 – Chas Hodges, 74, British folk singer and keyboardist (Chas & Dave)
- 24 – Richard Parker, 81, American doo-wop singer (The Charms)
- 25 – Paul Dillon, 75, American rock drummer (Earth Opera)
- 27 – Marty Balin, 76, American psychedelic rock singer and guitarist (Jefferson Airplane, Jefferson Starship, KBC Band)
- 29
  - Otis Rush, 84, American blues singer and guitarist
  - Michael Weiley, 58, Australian ska guitarist (Spy vs. Spy)
- 30 – Kim Larsen, 72, Danish rock singer and guitarist (Gasolin')

=== October ===
- 1
  - Charles Aznavour, 94, French pop singer
  - Jerry González, 69, American Latin jazz trumpeter
- 3
  - Hugo Raspoet, 77, Belgian folk singer
  - John Von Ohlen, 77, American jazz drummer (Blue Wisp Big Band)
- 4 – Hamiet Bluiett, 78, American jazz saxophonist (World Saxophone Quartet)
- 5 – Bernadette Carroll, 74, American pop singer (The Angels)
- 6 – Montserrat Caballé, 85, Spanish opera singer
- 7 – John Wicks, 65, British power pop singer and guitarist (The Records, The Kursaal Flyers)
- 8 – Tim Chandler, 58, American Christian alternative rock bassist (Daniel Amos, The Swirling Eddies, The Choir)
- 10 – Jane Walker, New Zealand new wave keyboardist (Toy Love)
- 12 – Andy Goessling, 59, American progressive bluegrass multi-instrumentalist (Railroad Earth)
- 14 – Saleem Abdul Majid, 57, Malaysian rock singer (Iklim)
- 16 – Du Yuwei, 19, Chinese pop singer (GNZ48)
- 17
  - Valters Frīdenbergs, 30, Latvian pop singer (Valters and Kaža)
  - Oli Herbert, 44, American metalcore guitarist (All That Remains)
- 18
  - Ayub Bachchu, 56, Bangladeshi rock singer and guitarist (Souls, Love Runs Blind)
  - Sergey Bondarenko, 31, Ukrainian pop rock singer (Nensi)
  - Randolph Hokanson, 103, American classical pianist
- 23 – Mighty Shadow, 77, Trinidadian calypsonian
- 24
  - Hip Hop Pantsula, 38, South African rapper
  - Wah Wah Watson, 67, American R&B and funk guitarist (The Funk Brothers)
  - Tony Joe White, 75, American swamp rock singer, songwriter and guitarist
- 25 – Sonny Fortune, 79, American jazz saxophonist
- 26 – Baba Oje, 87, American rapper and musician (Arrested Development)
- 27
  - Freddie Hart, 91, American country and gospel singer
  - Teddy Scott, 82, American R&B singer (The G-Clefs)
  - Todd Youth, 47, American punk rock guitarist (Murphy's Law, Danzig, The Chelsea Smiles)
- 28 – Babs Beverley, 91, British pop singer (Beverley Sisters)
- 29
  - Jimmy Farrar, 67, American southern rock singer (Molly Hatchet, Gator Country)
  - Young Greatness, 34, American rapper
- 30
  - Hardy Fox, 73, American avant garde multi-instrumentalist and composer (The Residents)
  - Beverly McClellan, 49, American blues and folk singer
- 31 – Kenny Marks, 67, American contemporary Christian singer

=== November ===
- 1
  - Thomas Diaz, 32, American emo singer and musician (The World Is a Beautiful Place & I Am No Longer Afraid to Die)
  - Dave Rowland, 74, American country singer (Dave & Sugar)
- 2
  - Josh Fauver, 39, American indie rock bassist (Deerhunter)
  - Roy Hargrove, 49, American jazz trumpeter
  - Glenn Schwartz, 78, American rock and blues guitarist (James Gang, Pacific Gas & Electric)
- 3
  - Mark Fosson, American primitive guitarist
  - Maria Guinot, 73, Portuguese pop singer
- 6 – Hugh McDowell, 65, British progressive rock cellist (Wizzard, Electric Light Orchestra)
- 7
  - Scott Herrick, American pop singer (The Arbors)
  - Francis Lai, 86, French film composer
- 13 – Lucho Gatica, 93, Chilean bolero singer
- 15
  - Roy Clark, 85, American country singer
  - Ivan Smirnov, 63, Russian jazz fusion guitarist
- 16
  - Al James, 72, British rock guitarist (Showaddywaddy)
  - Norris Weir, 72, Jamaican ska singer (The Jamaicans)
- 17 – Cyril Pahinui, 68, American Hawaiian music guitarist
- 20
  - Roy Bailey, 83, British folk singer, songwriter and guitarist
  - Trevor McNaughton, 77, Jamaican reggae singer (The Melodians)
- 21 – Devin Lima, 41, American pop singer (LFO)
- 22 – Imrat Khan, 83, Indian classical sitarist
- 27 – Johnny Maddox, 91, American ragtime pianist
- 28
  - Gary Haisman, 60, British hip house singer
  - Roger Neumann, 77, American jazz saxophonist
- 29 – Erik Lindmark, 46, American technical death metal singer and guitarist (Deeds of Flesh)

=== December ===
- 1
  - Calvin Newborn, 85, American jazz guitarist
  - Jody Williams, 83, American blues guitarist
- 2 – Perry Robinson, 80, American jazz clarinetist
- 6
  - Ace Cannon, 84, American pop saxophonist
  - Pete Shelley, 63, British punk singer, songwriter and guitarist (Buzzcocks)
- 7
  - The Mascara Snake, 70, American avant-garde clarinetist (Captain Beefheart and His Magic Band)
  - Lucas Starr, 34, American metalcore and Christian rock bassist (Oh, Sleeper, Terminal, As Cities Burn)
- 9 – Yigal Bashan, 68, Israeli pop singer
- 10 – Fred Wieland, 75, Australian rock guitarist (The Strangers, The Mixtures)
- 11 – Angelo Conti, 62, Italian punk singer (Banda Bassotti)
- 13 – Nancy Wilson, 81, American jazz singer
- 14
  - Vida Chenoweth, 90, American classical marimbist and ethnomusicologist
  - Joe Osborn, 81, American rock bassist (The Wrecking Crew)
- 15
  - Arthur Maia, 56, Brazilian jazz and samba bassist and composer
  - Jerry Chesnut, 87, American country singer and songwriter
- 17 – Galt MacDermot, 89, Canadian-American composer (Hair, Two Gentlemen of Verona) and pianist
- 21 – Dipali Barthakur, 77, Indian folk singer
- 22
  - Indonesian musicians, members of the pop rock band Seventeen
    - Windu Andi Darmawan, drummer
    - Muhammad Awal Purbani, bassist
    - Herman Sikumbang, guitarist
  - Jimmy Work, 94, American country singer-songwriter
- 23 – Honey Lantree, 75, British pop drummer and singer (The Honeycombs)
- 24
  - Jerry Riopelle, 77, American pop singer-songwriter and keyboardist (The Parade)
  - Jaime Torres, Argentine folk charango player
  - James Calvin Wilsey, 61, American rock guitarist (Avengers, Chris Isaak)
- 25 – Guto Barros, 61, Brazilian rock guitarist (Blitz)
- 26 – Theodore Antoniou, 83, Greek classical music composer and conductor
- 27 – Miúcha, 81, Brazilian bossa nova singer
- 28 – Christine McGuire, 92, American pop singer (The McGuire Sisters)
- 29 – Aldo Parisot, 100, Brazilian-born American classical music cellist
- 30 – Mike Taylor, Canadian indie pop keyboardist (Walk Off the Earth)
- 31
  - Dean Ford, 72, Scottish pop and rock singer-songwriter (Marmalade, The Alan Parsons Project)
  - Ray Sawyer, 81, American rock singer and percussionist (Dr. Hook & the Medicine Show)

== See also ==
- Timeline of musical events
- Women in music
