= 2018 in Asian music =

== Events ==
- January 2 – Police in India arrest singer and instrumentalist Ghazal Srinivas following claims of sexual harassment by an employee of his radio station.
- January 4 – It is reported that British singer Jessie J will be among the competitors in the new season of Chinese talent show The Singer 2018, to be broadcast on Hunan TV.
- January 16 – Chinese fans and musicians pay tribute to Dolores O'Riordan, lead singer of The Cranberries, who performed in China in 2011.
- January 21 – The Voice of Mongolia talent contest is launched on Mongol TV, and is eventually won by Enguun.
- March 2 – The 14th Jakarta International Java Jazz Festival opens in Jakarta, Indonesia, lasting until 4 March.
- March 25 – Sinta Wullur's Tagore's Fireflies is premièred at Symphony Hall, Birmingham, during the Debussy Festival.
- April – Indonesian actress and singer Maudy Ayunda releases a volume of autobiography in English, titled Dear Tomorrow.
- August – Armand Maulana, Anggun and Titi DJ are announced as judges for Season 3 of The Voice Indonesia, along with singers Vidi Aldiano and id:Anindyo Baskoro as joint coaches.

== Albums ==
- AGA – Luna (January 22)
- Arkona – Khram (January 19)
- Band-Maid – World Domination (February 14)
- Gugudan – Act. 4 Cait Sith (February 1)
- Koda Kumi
  - And (February 28)
  - DNA (August 22)
- Kyary Pamyu Pamyu – Japamyu (September 26)
- Morning Musume – Hatachi no Morning Musume (February 7)
- Seungri – The Great Seungri (July 20)

== Classical ==
- Bishnu Priya – The Good Immigrant
- Alexander Rahbari – My Mother Persia

== Opera ==
- Toshio Hosokawa and Marcel Beyer – Erdbeben.Träume.
- Gity Razaz – Fault Lines

== Musical films ==
- 7 Din Mohabbat In (Pakistan)
- Amma I Love You (India)
- Bhaijaan Elo Re (India)
- Brihaspathi (India)
- Fanney Khan (India)
- Happy Phirr Bhag Jayegi (India)
- Inspector Notty K (Bangladesh)
- Jaane Kyun De Yaaron (India)
- Kids on the Slope (Japan)
- Manto (India - Urdu)
- Noor Jahaan (Bangladesh)
- Ang Panahon ng Halimaw (Philippines)
- Super Hero (film) (Bangladesh)
- Teefa in Trouble (Pakistan)
- TokiRes the Movie: MIRACLE6 (Japan)

== Deaths ==
- January 3 – Medeniyet Shahberdiyeva, Turkmen opera singer and music educator, 87
- January 15 – Sujud Sutrisno, 64, Indonesian street drummer and singer, 64
- January 16 – Shammi Akhtar, Bangladeshi playback singer, 60 (breast cancer)
- January 22 – Ceylon Manohar, Indian actor and playback singer, 73
- January 25 – Sabar Koti, Indian singer, 58
- January 31 – Hwang Byungki, South Korean gayageum player, 81
- February 5 – Jockie Soerjoprajogo, 63, Indonesian musician and songwriter
- March 1 – Arabinda Muduli, 56, Indian musician and singer
- May 2 – Vadim Mulerman, 79, Soviet singer
- May 4 – Abi Ofarim, 80, Israeli singer and dancer
- May 6
  - Arun Date, 84, Indian singer
  - Gurukrushna Goswami, 84, Indian lyricist
- May 16 – Hideki Saijo, 63, Japanese singer (heart failure)
- July 30 – Khayyam Mirzazade, 82, Azerbaijani composer and academic
- August 1 – Umbayee, 66, Indian ghazal singer (cancer)
- August 5 – Ellen Joyce Loo, 32, Canadian-born Hong Kong singer (fall)
- September 19 – Buren Bayaer, 58, Chinese singer and journalist (heart attack)
- October 2 – Balabhaskar, 40, Indian violinist, composer and record producer (cardiac arrest)
- October 9 – Nitin Bali, 47, Indian singer (traffic collision)
- October 13 – Annapurna Devi, 91, Indian classical musician
- October 14
  - Aziza Niyozmetova, 46, Uzbekistani singer
  - Saleem, 57, Malaysian singer (traffic collision)
- October 16 – Du Yuwei, 19, Chinese singer (suicide)
- October 18 – Ayub Bachchu, 56, Bangladeshi singer-songwriter
- October 30
  - Rico J. Puno, 65, Filipino pop singer (heart failure)
  - Yashwant Dev, 91, Indian poet and composer
- November 14 – Masahiro Sayama, 64, Japanese pianist.
- November 22 – Imrat Khan, 83, Indian sitar player
- November 27 – Mohammed Aziz, 64, Indian playback singer (heart attack)
- December 22 – Indonesian musicians killed in the Sunda Strait tsunami:
  - Windu Andi Darmawan, drummer (Seventeen).
  - Muhammad Awal Purbani, bassist (Seventeen).
  - Herman Sikumbang, 36, guitarist (Seventeen).

== By country ==
- 2018 in Chinese music
- 2018 in Japanese music
- 2018 in Philippine music
- 2018 in South Korean music

== See also ==
- 2018 in music
