= 2018 in rock music =

This article summarizes the events related to rock music for the year of 2018.

== Notable events ==
=== January ===
- Royal Blood's single "I Only Lie When I Love You" tops the Billboard Mainstream Rock Songs chart, and remains there for six weeks.
- Fall Out Boy releases their seventh studio album, Mania. It tops the US Billboard 200 chart, their fourth album to do so, selling 130,000 album equivalent units.

=== February ===
- Papa Roach's single "Born for Greatness" tops the Mainstream Rock chart for two weeks.
- Greta Van Fleet's single "Safari Song" tops the Mainstream Rock chart for one week. It is their second single, as well as their second single to top the chart.
- Billy Corgan announces the reformation of 3/4 of The Smashing Pumpkins original lineup of himself, James Iha, and Jimmy Chamberlin, will record new music and tour in 2018. Original bassist D'arcy Wretzky does not return, with she and Corgan both citing numerous disagreements concerning the reunion.

=== March ===
- Papa Roach's "Born for Greatness" and Greta Van Fleet's "Safari Song" return to top the Mainstream Rock charts for one and two weeks respectively.
- Pop Evil's single "Waking Lions" tops the Mainstream Rock chart for a week.
- Three Days Grace's single "The Mountain" tops the Mainstream Rock chart for five weeks.

=== April ===
- Jack White releases his third solo studio album, Boarding House Reach. It tops the Billboard 200 chart, moving 124,000 album equivalent units. It is his third of three solo albums to top the chart.
- Breaking Benjamin releases their sixth studio album Ember. It debuts at number 3 on the Billboard 200 chart, moving 88,000 album equivalent units.
- A Perfect Circle releases their fourth studio album, and first in 14 years - Eat the Elephant. It debuts at number 3 on the Billboard 200 chart, moving 68,000 album equivalent units.
- Lord Huron releases their third studio album, Vide Noir. It debuts at number 9 on the Billboard 200 chart, moving 32,000 album equivalent units.

=== May ===
- Bad Wolves top the Mainstream Rock chart for three weeks with a cover of The Cranberries's song "Zombie". The cover was originally to feature duet vocals from original singer of the Cranberries Dolores O'Riordan, but they were never recorded due to her death in January 2018. The song was also one of the few hard rock songs to enter the Billboard all-format Hot 100 chart, debuting at number 54, the highest debut of any song for its debut week.
- Godsmack's single "Bulletproof" tops the Mainstream Rock chart for one week, their eighth song to top the chart.
- Shinedown's single "Devil" tops the Mainstream Rock chart for one week.
- Godsmack releases their seventh studio album When Legends Rise. It debuts at number 8 on the Billboard 200 chart, selling 40,000 album equivalent units.
- Shinedown releases their sixth studio album Attention Attention. It debuts at number 5 on the Billboard 200 chart, selling 60,000 album equivalent units.
- Five Finger Death Punch releases their seventh studio album And Justice for None. It debuts at number 4 on the Billboard 200 chart, selling 71,000 album equivalent units.
- Arctic Monkeys release their sixth studio album, Tranquility Base Hotel & Casino. It tops the UK all-format albums chart, selling 86,000 units. It is the band's sixth album in a row to top the UK chart. It debuts at number 8 on the US Billboard 200 chart, moving 47,000 album equivalent units.

=== June ===
- Godsmack's "Bulletproof" returns to number one on the Mainstream Rock chart for 4 weeks.
- Weezer's cover of the Toto song "Africa" debuts at number 89 on the Billboard all-format Hot 100 chart, their first song to find crossover success since 2009.
- Ghost releases their fourth studio album, Prequelle. It debuts at number 3 on the Billboard 200, selling 66,000 album equivalent units.
- Dave Matthews Band releases their ninth studio album, Come Tomorrow, which tops the Billboard 200 chart, their seventh album to do so. It debuts with 292,000 album equivalent units, the biggest rock album debut in four years.
- Panic! at the Disco releases their sixth studio album, Pray for the Wicked, which tops the Billboard 200, their second album to do so. The album sells 180,000 album equivalent units, the highest debut for an alternative rock album for the year.
- Richard Patrick of the band Filter announced the reformation of the band's original lineup - himself and Brian Liesegang, to record a follow-up to the only album the two had recorded jointly, the band's first album, the platinum selling 1995 album Short Bus.

=== July ===
- Ghost's single "Rats" tops the Mainstream Rock chart for seven straight weeks.
- Twenty One Pilots' more hard rock-oriented single, "Jumpsuit", is released, and later peaks at number 50 on the Billboard all-format Hot 100 chart.

=== August ===
- Halestorm releases their fourth studio album, Vicious, which debuts at number 8 on the Billboard 200 chart, selling 29,000 album equivalent units.
- Halestorm's lead single from Vicious, "Uncomfortable", tops the Mainstream Rock chart as well.

=== September ===
- Five Finger Death Punch's single "Sham Pain" tops the Billboard Mainstream Rock chart for one week. It is their fifth song to do so.
- Three Days Grace's single "Infra-Red" tops the Mainstream Rock chart. It is their fourteenth song to do so, more than any other band in the history of the chart, which started in 1981.
- Breaking Benjamin's single "Torn in Two" tops the Billboard Mainstream Rock chart for one week.
- Disturbed's single "Are You Ready" tops the Billboard Mainstream Rock chart for five weeks. It is their eighth song to top the chart, which is the seventh most a band has ever had on the chart at the time. It is also their fifth single in a row to top it, an all-time record shared with Three Days Grace.

=== October ===
- Greta Van Fleet releases their debut album, Anthem of the Peaceful Army. It is the top selling album of the week in the US, selling 80,000 copies. Factoring in streaming, it moves 87,000 album equivalent units, debuting at number 3 on the Billboard 200 chart.
- Disturbed releases their seventh studio album, Evolution. It charts directly behind Greta Van Fleet, as the second best selling album of the week, and at number 4 on the Billboard 200 chart, with 65,000 sold and 71,000 album equivalent units.
- Three fourths of the original lineup of Static-X announce they have reunited the band after the death of founder and frontman Wayne Static in 2014. The band announced their intention to release a new album in 2019, featuring a mix of vocals recorded by a static prior to his death, and a variety of guest musicians such as David Draiman and Ivan Moody.

=== November ===
- Greta Van Fleet single “When the Curtain Falls” tops the Billboard Mainstream Rock song chart. It is their third song across three separate album/EPs to do so in a 14 month span.
- Disturbed's “Are You Ready” returns to the top of the Billboard Mainstream Rock songs chart for another two weeks.

=== December ===
- Godsmack's single "When Legends Rise" tops the Mainstream Rock chart for four weeks, in a run that goes into 2019.

=== Year end ===
- Greta Van Fleet receives four Grammy Nominations. Ghost receives two.

== Deaths ==
- Jon Paul Steuer, American punk singer and actor, dies by suicide on January 1, at 33 years old.
- Josiah Boyd, American bassist of A Hill to Die Upon), died in a car accident on January 3, at 32 years old.
- Ray Thomas, British progressive rock flautist (The Moody Blues), died on January 4, at 76 years old.
- Mikio Fujioka, Japanese guitarist of Babymetal, died on January 5 of injuries from a fall, at 36 years old.
- Dolores O'Riordan, lead singer of The Cranberries, dies on January 15, 2018, at 46 years old.
- Mark E. Smith, of The Fall, dies of cancer on January 24, 2018, at 60 years old.
- Zeno Roth, German rock guitarist, dies on February 5, 2018, at 51 years old.
- Charlie Quintana, American punk rock drummer, dies of a heart attack on March 14, 2018, at 56 years old.
- Brian Henry Hooper, Australian alternative rock guitarist (Beasts of Bourbon, Kim Salmon and the Surrealists), dies on April 20, 2018, at 55 years old.
- Vinnie Paul, drummer of Pantera and Hellyeah, dies on June 23, 2018, at 54 years old.
- Jill Janus, lead singer of Huntress, dies on August 17, 2018, of suicide, at 43 years old.
- Zang Tianshuo, Chinese rock musician, formerly of the band 1989, dies on September 28, of liver cancer, aged 54.
- Josh Fauver, American rock bassist (Deerhunter), dies on November 2, of unknown causes, at 39 years old.
- Pete Shelley, leader of the British band Buzzcocks, dies on December 6 of a heart attack, aged 63.
- Herman Sikumbang, guitarist in the Indonesian band Seventeen, aged 36, and his fellow band members, drummer Windu Andi Darmawan and drummer Awal "Bani" Purbani, are killed in the Sunda Strait tsunami on December 22, when waves hit their stage during a concert.

== Band breakups ==
- Brand New
- Rush
- Say Anything
