= List of years in Swedish music =

This page indexes the individual year in Swedish music pages. Each year is annotated with a significant event as a reference point.

== 2020s ==
- 2024 in Swedish music
- 2023 in Swedish music
- 2022 in Swedish music
- 2021 in Swedish music
- 2020 in Swedish music

== 2010s ==
- 2019 in Swedish music
- 2018 in Swedish music, deaths of Bo Nilsson, Frank Andersson, Javiera Muñoz, Jerry Williams, Kenneth Gärdestad, Lill-Babs, and Stefan Demert.
- 2017 in Swedish music, deaths of Björn Thelin, Boris Lindqvist, Folke Rabe, Ingvar Lidholm, Lars Diedricson, Rikard Wolff, Robert Dahlqvist, Siegfried Köhler, Sven-Erik Magnusson, and Tony Särkkä.
- 2016 in Swedish music, deaths of Carina Jaarnek, Freddie Wadling, Fredrik Norén, Jacques Werup, Josefin Nilsson, Olle Ljungström, and Sydney Onayemi.
- 2015 in Swedish music, deaths of Bengt-Arne Wallin, Kjell Öhman, and Peter Lundblad.
- 2014 in Swedish music, death of Alice Babs, Christian Falk, and Mats Rondin.
- 2013 in Swedish music
- 2012 in Swedish music
- 2011 in Swedish music
- 2010 in Swedish music

== Pre-2010s ==
- 2009 in Swedish music
- 2008 in Swedish music
- 2007 in Swedish music
- 2006 in Swedish music
- 2005 in Swedish music
- 2004 in Swedish music
- 2003 in Swedish music
- 2002 in Swedish music
- 2001 in Swedish music
- 2000 in Swedish music
