= 2018 in African music =

The following is a list of events and releases that happened in 2018 in African music.

== Events ==
- January 10 – The Premium Times lists Squeeze Tarela and Bella Alubo among its "Nigerian artistes to look out for in 2018".
- January 13 – Youssou N'Dour, on tour in the Gambia, praises the Gambian people and expresses optimism for the country's future.
- January 28 – At the 60th Annual Grammy Awards, Ladysmith Black Mambazo win the award for Best World Music Album with Shaka Zulu Revisited: 30th Anniversary Celebration and are nominated for the Best Children's Album award for Songs of Peace & Love for Kids & Parents Around the World.
- March 30 – Announcement of the winner of the AfriMusic Song Contest 2018, the first pan-African song contest. Eswatini win the contest, represented by the song "Sengikhona", performed by Symphony (Zanele Cele).
- June 2 – Rita Ray presents a major new series on BBC television: Africa: A Journey Into Music.
- August 10 – The Minnesota Orchestra becomes the first American orchestra ever to perform in South Africa when it gives the first concert of its South African tour, at City Hall, Cape Town.

== Albums released in 2018 ==
Release date	Artist	Album	Genre	Label	Ref
January; 26	Burna Boy	Outside	Afrobeats, hip-hop, dancehall	Atlantic Records	
January; 26	Professor	Composed by Jesus Christ	Kwaito, dance	Kalawa Jazmee Records	
January; 31	Zaki Ibrahim	The Secret Life of Planets	R&B, soul	Indie	
February; 9	M.I Abaga	Rendezvous: The Playlist	Hip-hop	Chocolate City	
February; 23	Femi Kuti	One People One World	Afrobeat	Knitting Factory Records	
February; 23	Hailu Mergia	Lala Belu	Jazz	Awesome Tapes from Africa	
March ?	Pape Diouf	Enjoy!	Mbalax, World		
March; 2	Seun Kuti	Black Times	Afrobeat, World	Strut Records	
March; 27	Brymo	Oṣó	Alternative folk, Yoruba music	Indie	
May; 21	Allah Thérèse & N'Goran Laloi	Bé gnanssou moayé			
May 14	Ike Moriz	Millennium Hits 2002 - 2018	Pop, Rock, Jazz	Mosquito Records London	
May; 25	DJ Neptune	Greatness	Afrobeats, hip-hop	Neptune Records	
May; 25	Adekunle Gold	About 30	World, highlife	Afro Urban Records, Empire	
June; 15	Zonke	L.O.V.E	Afro-soul	Sony	
August; 24	M.I Abaga	A Study On Self Worth: Yxng Dxnzl	Hip-hop	Chocolate City	
September; 11	Steve Kekana	Ubuntu	Sold Out Music		
October; 19	Razia	The Road	Razia Said Music		
November; 9	Mr Eazi	Life Is Eazi, Vol. 2 - Lagos to London	Afrobeats	Banku Music	
November; 16	Mayorkun	The Mayor of Lagos	Afropop	Davido Music Worldwide	

== Classical ==
- Michael Blake – Lovedale Harmony (in memory of Siya Betana) (2017) for saxophone quartet

== Deaths ==
- January 3 – Lara Kruger, 30, South African DJ (Motsweding FM) and transgender rights activist
- January 4 – Joseph Gunduza Magigwani, 37, Zimbabwean actor and gospel singer (traffic collision)
- January 23 – Hugh Masekela, 78, South African jazz instrumentalist, composer and singer
- February 1 – Mowzey Radio, 33, Ugandan musician (head injuries from a fight)
- February 8 - Ebony Reigns, 20, Ghanaian singer (traffic collision)
- March 19 – Shavey, Kenyan dancehall singer (traffic collision)
- April 2 – Ahmed Janka Nabay, Sierra Leonean musician, 54
- May 20 – N'Goran La Loi, Ivorian accordionist, husband and partner of Allah Thérèse, 87
- June 10 – Ras Kimono, Nigerian reggae musician, 60
- September 12 – Rachid Taha, Algerian singer (Carte de Séjour), 59 (heart attack)
- October 3 – Joseph Kamaru, Kenyan benga musician and political activist, 79 (complications from Parkinson's disease)
- October 24 – Hip Hop Pantsula, South African rapper, 38
- November 13 – Brian Rusike, Zimbabwean songwriter and keyboardist, 62

== See also ==
- 2018 in music
