= Panousis =

Panousis (Greek: Πανούσης) is a Greek surname. Notable people with the surname include:

- Tzimis Panousis (1954–2018), Greek musician, stand-up comedian, and actor
- Yannis Panousis, Greek politician and government minister
