= Ed Simons =

Ed Simons may refer to:

- Ed Simons (conductor) (1917–2018), American violinist and conductor
- Ed Simons (musician) (born 1970), English musician, one of The Chemical Brothers
