= Static (Huntress album) =

Studio album by Huntress
- Released: September 25, 2015
- Genre: Heavy metal
- Length: 47:23
- Label: Napalm Records
- Producers: Paul Fig, Jim Rota

Huntress chronology
| Starbound Beast (2013) | Static (2015) |

Singles from Static
- 1. "Flesh" Released: July 31, 2015; 2. "Sorrow" Released: September 25, 2015

Professional ratings
Review scores
| Source | Rating |
|---|---|
| AllMusic | 3.5/5 stars |
| Brave Words & Bloody Knuckles | 7/10 |

Static is the third and final studio album by American heavy metal band Huntress. It was released on September 25, 2015. The album title, track listing and cover were announced on June 15, with an audio snippet of the song "Flesh".

A lyric video for the song "Flesh" was released on July 31, 2015. A music video for the song "Sorrow" was released on September 25, 2015.

This is the final album recorded with singer Jill Janus before she took her own life on August 14, 2018.

== Track listing ==
Music by Huntress. Lyrics by Jill Janus.

| No. | Title | Length |
|---|---|---|
| 1. | "Sorrow" | 3:48 |
| 2. | "Flesh" | 4:13 |
| 3. | "Brian" | 4:36 |
| 4. | "I Want to Wanna Wake Up" | 3:27 |
| 5. | "Mania" | 8:43 |
| 6. | "Four Blood Moons" | 4:59 |
| 7. | "Static" | 3:47 |
| 8. | "Harsh Times on Planet Stoked" | 4:42 |
| 9. | "Noble Savage" | 4:37 |
| 10. | "Fire in My Heart" | 4:31 |
| Total length: | | 47:23 |

Bonus tracks
| No. | Title | Length |
|---|---|---|
| 11. | "Black Tongue" | 3:28 |
| 12. | "Vultures Can Wait" (7” vinyl exclusive) | 4:31 |
| Total length: | | 55:22 |

== Personnel ==
Huntress

- Jill Janus – vocals
- Blake Meahl – lead guitar, bass
- Eli Santana – rhythm guitar
- Tyler Meahl – drums

Production

- Paul Fig – production, engineering, mixing
- Jim Rota – production
- Gene Grimaldi - mastering
- Vance Kelly – artwork and layout
