= Starbound Beast =

Studio album by Huntress
- Released: July 2, 2013
- Genre: Heavy metal
- Length: 44:04
- Label: Napalm Records

Huntress chronology
Spell Eater (2012)	Starbound Beast (2013)	Static (2015)

Singles from Starbound Beast
- 1. "Zenith" Released: August 23, 2013

Professional ratings
Review scores
Source	Rating
About.com	4/5 stars
AllMusic	3/5 stars
PopMatters	5/10 stars

Starbound Beast is the second studio album by American heavy metal band Huntress. It was released on July 2, 2013.

== Track listing ==
Music by Huntress and lyrics by Jill Janus, except where noted.

No.	Title	Writer(s)	Length
1.	"Enter the Exosphere"		1:26
2.	"Blood Sisters"		4:36
3.	"I Want to Fuck You to Death" (lyrics by Lemmy Kilmister)		3:40
4.	"Destroy Your Life"		4:20
5.	"Starbound Beast"		5:09
6.	"Zenith"		3:57
7.	"Oracle"		4:48
8.	"Receiver"		4:31
9.	"Spectra Spectral"		5:12
10.	"Alpha Tauri"		6:24
11.	"Running Wild" (bonus track; Judas Priest cover)	Glenn Tipton	2:35
Total length:			46:38

== Personnel ==
Huntress

- Jill Janus – vocals
- Blake Meahl – lead guitar
- Anthony Crocamo – rhythm guitar
- Ian Alden – bass
- Carl Wierzbicky – drums

Production

- Zeuss - production, engineering, mixing, and mastering
- Vance Kelley - artwork and layout
