= Spell Eater =

Studio album by Huntress
- Released: April 27, 2012
- Genre: Heavy metal
- Length: 46:46
- Label: Napalm Records

Huntress chronology
Spell Eater (2012)	Starbound Beast (2013)

Singles from Spell Eater
- 1. "Eight of Swords" Released: 2011; 2. "Spell Eater" Released: 2012

Professional ratings
Review scores
Source	Rating
About.com	3/5 stars
Blistering	6/10 stars

Spell Eater is the debut studio album by American heavy metal band Huntress. It was released on April 27, 2012. The album was produced, engineered and mixed at the Sunset Lodge Recording studio in Los Angeles, California.

== Track listing ==
Music by Huntress. Lyrics by Jill Janus.

No.	Title	Length
1.	"Spell Eater"	3:57
2.	"Senicide"	4:00
3.	"Sleep and Death"	4:27
4.	"Snow Witch"	5:02
5.	"Eight of Swords"	5:42
6.	"Aradia"	4:08
7.	"Night Rape"	3:17
8.	"Children"	3:11
9.	"Terror"	4:45
10.	"The Tower"	4:31
11.	"The Dark" (bonus track)	3:46
Total length:		46:46

== Personnel ==
Huntress

- Jill Janus – vocals
- Blake Meahl – lead guitar
- Ian Alden – rhythm guitar
- Eric Harris - bass
- Carl Wierzbicky – drums

Production

- Chris Rakestraw - Production, engineering, and mixing
- Vance Kelley - Artwork and layout
