= Sabar Koti =

Sabar Koti ਸਾਬਰ ਕੋਟੀ
- Born: 20 January 1965; Kot Karar Khan
- Died: 25 January 2018 (aged 53) Jalandhar
- Occupation: Singer
- Years active: 1993–2018

Sabar Koti (Punjabi: ਸਾਬਰਕੋਟੀ) was an Indian Punjabi singer. He was best known for his song Tennu Ki Dasiye which was one of the hit songs in Punjabi music industry.

== Personal life and death ==
Sabar Koti was born on 20 January 1965, into a family of musicians to Amarnath and Chinti Devi, and he was married to Rita with whom he has three children Alex Koti, William Koti and Rageshwari Koti. Sabar Koti died on 25 January 2018, after a prolonged illness in a hospital in Jalandhar and was cremated in Kot Karar Khan, which was his birthplace. On the day of his funeral, the village council announced to build a memorial in his honour.

== Discography ==
=== Music albums ===
Release	Album	Record label	Music director	Note	ref
1995	Mera Dil Kho Gaya	DMC Records	Surender Bachan	Album	
1996	Aashqan Da Dil	T-Series	Surender Bachan	Album	
1998	Sone Deya Kangna	His Master's Voice	Charanjit Ahuja	Album	
2001	Mundran Wala Jogi	Hi-Tech Music Ltd	Surender Bachan	Album	
2001	Ik Chan Umbran Te	Hi-Tech Music Ltd	Surender Bachan	Album	
2002	Shonk Amiran Da	Tips music	Charanjit Ahuja	Album	
2005	Hanju	Sony Music Entertainment	Jaidev Kumar	Album	
2006	Tanhaiyan	Audio Touch	Jaidev Kumar	Album	
2008	Farmaish	Music Waves	Jaidev Kumar	Album	
2012	Chot	Tellytune		Single	
2014	Tera Chehra	Sony Music Entertainment	Jaidev Kumar	Album	
2014	Gamm Nahi Mukde	Fresher Records	M Herry	Album	
2016	Khair Khuwa	Speed Records	Jassi Bros	Album	
2016	Dukh Den Di	Anand Cassettes Industries	Bunty Sahota	Album	
2017	Hanju 2	Ramaz Music	Gurmeet Singh	Album	
2017	Sharab	Venus Worldwide Entertainment	Bunty Sahota	Single	
2018	Asi Ese Joge Reh Gaye	Shinestar Intl.		Single	

Devotional albums

Release	Album	Record label	Music director	Note
1999	Manglo Murada	His Master's Voice		Album
2009	Katra Katra Amrit Da	Shemaroo Entertainment		EP
2015	Om Sai Ram	Amar Audio	Hari Amit	Album
2015	Vaishno Maa	Amar Audio		Album
2017	Satguru Kanshi Wala	NKN Music		Album

== Filmography ==
Film	Roles	Language	Year
Ishq Nachavye Gali Gali	playback singer	Punjabi	1996
Tabaahi	playback singer	Punjabi	1996
Tara Ambara Te	playback singer	Punjabi	2002
Pind Di Kudi	playback singer	Punjabi	2005
Majaajan	playback singer	Punjabi	2008
