= Kot Karar Khan =

- Village
- Location in Punjab, India Kot Karar Khan (India)
- Coordinates: 31.380875°N 75.467486°E
- Country: India
- State: Punjab
- District: Kapurthala

Government
  - Type: Panchayati raj (India)
  - Body: Gram panchayat

Population (2011)
  - Total: 1,858
- Sex ratio 954/904♂/♀

Languages
  - Official: Punjabi
  - Other spoken: Hindi
- Time zone: UTC+5:30 (IST)
- PIN: 144601
- Telephone code: 01822
- ISO 3166 code: IN-PB
- Vehicle registration: PB-09
- Website: kapurthala.gov.in

Kot Karar Khan is a village in Kapurthala district of Punjab State, India. It is located 12 kilometres (7.5 mi) from Kapurthala, which is both district and sub-district headquarters of Kot Karar Khan. The village is administrated by a Sarpanch who is an elected representative of village.

== Demography ==
According to the report published by Census India in 2011, Kot Karar Khan has 367 households with a total population of 1,858 persons, of which 954 were male and 904 female. The literacy rate of was 75.62%, lower than the state average of 75.84%. The population of children in the age group 0–6 years was 213 which was 11.46% of the total population. Child sex ratio was approximately 936, higher than the state average of 846.

== Population data ==
Particulars	Total	Male	Female
Total No. of Houses	367	-	-
Population	1,858	954	904
Child (0-6)	213	110	103
Schedule Caste	1,097	562	535
Schedule Tribe	0	0	0
Literacy	75.62 %	79.27 %	71.79 %
Total Workers	765	552	213
Main Worker	740	0	0
Marginal Worker	25	10	15
