= 2018 in Danish music =

The following is a list of notable events and releases of the year 2018 in Danish music.

== Events ==
=== February ===
- 10 – The artist and song for Denmark in the Eurovision Song Contest 2018 was decided.

=== May ===
- 30 – The 20th Distortion festival started in Copenhagen (May 30 - June 3).

=== June ===
- 9 – The NorthSide Festival opened in Aarhus (June 9–11).
- 21 – The 9th Copenhell festival started in Copenhagen (June 21–23).
- 28 – The 4th Tinderbox Festival started in Odense (June 28–30).

=== July ===
- 4 – The 47th Roskilde Festival opened (July 4–7).
- 6 – The 38th Copenhagen Jazz Festival started in Copenhagen, Denmark (July 6 – 15).
- 11 – G! Festival opensed in Göta, Eysturoy, Faroe Islands (July 11–14).
- 14 – The 30th Aarhus Jazz Festival started (July 14–21).

=== August ===
- 8 – The Strøm Fesatival started in Copenhagen (August 8–11).

=== September ===
- 5 – The Copenhagen World Music Festival started (September 5–9).

== Albums released ==
=== February ===
| Day | Album | Artist | Label | Notes | Ref. |
|---|---|---|---|---|---|
| 23 | Pilgrim | Janne Mark with Arve Henriksen | ACT | Produced by Esben Eyermann and Janne Mark | |

=== March ===
| Day | Album | Artist | Label | Notes | Ref. |
|---|---|---|---|---|---|
| 23 | Returnings | Jakob Bro with Palle Mikkelborg, Thomas Morgan, and Jon Christensen | ECM | Produced by Manfred Eicher | |

=== October ===
| Day | Album | Artist | Label | Notes | Ref. |
|---|---|---|---|---|---|
| 5 | Bay Of Rainbows | Jakob Bro, Thomas Morgan, and Joey Baron | ECM Records | | |

== Deaths ==
January

- 1 – Teddy Edelmann, singer (born 1941).

August

- 16 – Benny Andersen, writer and pianist (born 1929).

October

- 30 – Kim Larsen, rock singer and guitarist, Gasolin' (born 1945).

== See also ==
- Music of Denmark
- Denmark in the Eurovision Song Contest 2018
