= Valentina Levko =

Russian opera singer (1926–2018)

Background information
- Born: Valentina Nikolayevna Surkovа; 13 August 1926; Moscow, RSFSR, Soviet Union
- Died: 14 August 2018 (aged 92) Moscow, Russia
- Occupations: Mezzo-soprano, contralto

Valentina Nikolayevna Levko (Russian: Валенти́на Никола́евна Левко́; 13 August, 1926 – 14 August, 2018) was a Soviet and Russian opera and chamber singer (contralto, mezzo-soprano), teacher, professor. She was a soloist of the Bolshoi Theatre of USSR from 1960 to 1982. In 1969, she was awarded the People's Artist of the RSFSR.

She began her way to the stardom as a violinist, after which she attended and graduated from the Gnessin State Musical College, where she also taught since 1974.

In 2002, she was awarded the Order of Honour for many years of fruitful activity in the field of culture and art.

She died on 14 August 2018, the day after her 92nd birthday, after a long serious illness.
