= Nensi =

Ukrainian music group founded in 1992

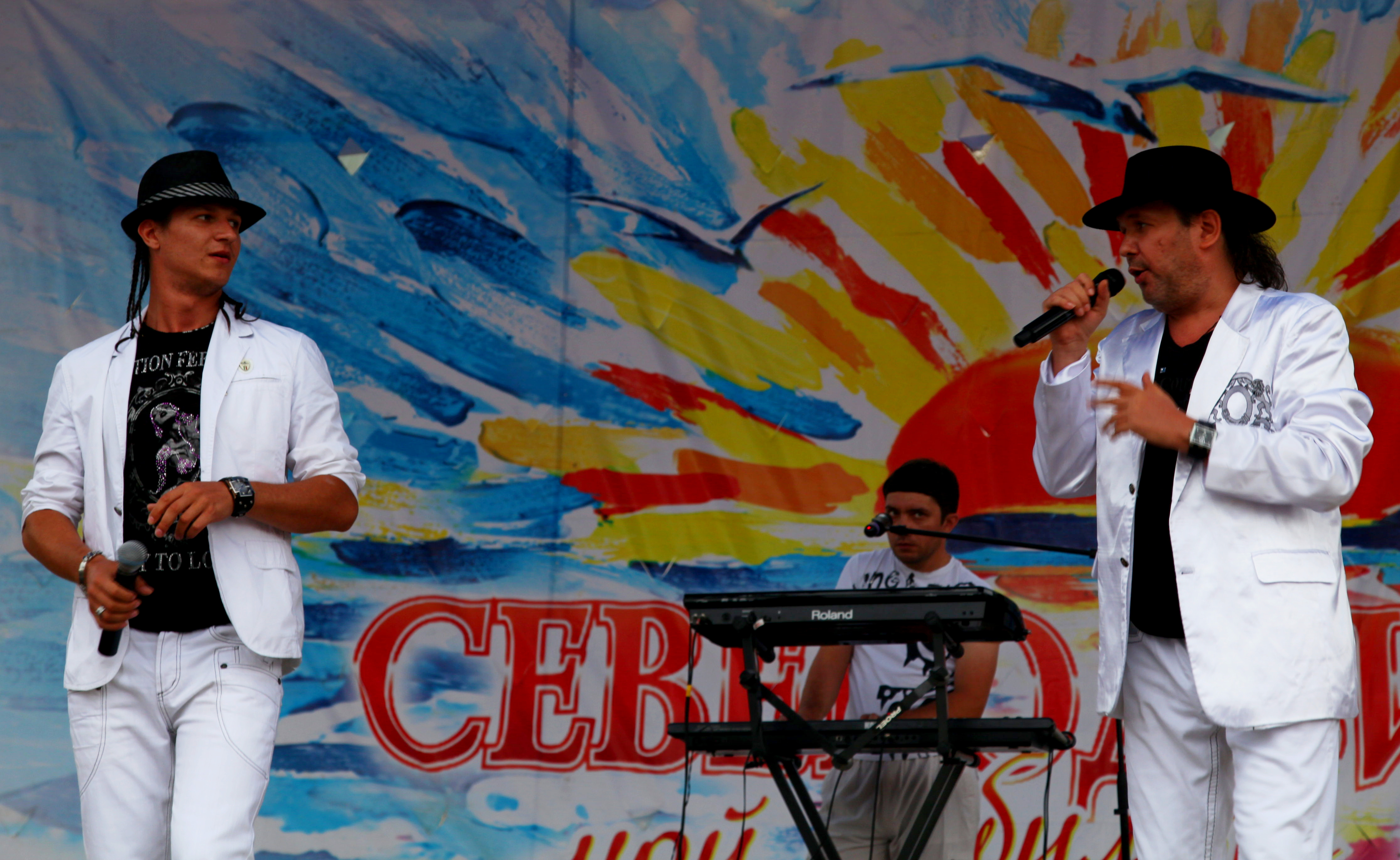
- Nensi in Severodvinsk in 2012

Background information
- Origin: Ukraine
- Genres: Pop, pop rock, dance-pop
- Years active: 1992–present
- Label: Bondarenko-Media
- Members: Anatoly Bondarenko; Oleksii Shubovych; Andrey Kostenko; Anatoly Kuznetsov; Aleksei Tsiplakov; Evgeny Tartsus
- Past members: Sergey Bondarenko
- Website: gruppa-nensi.ru

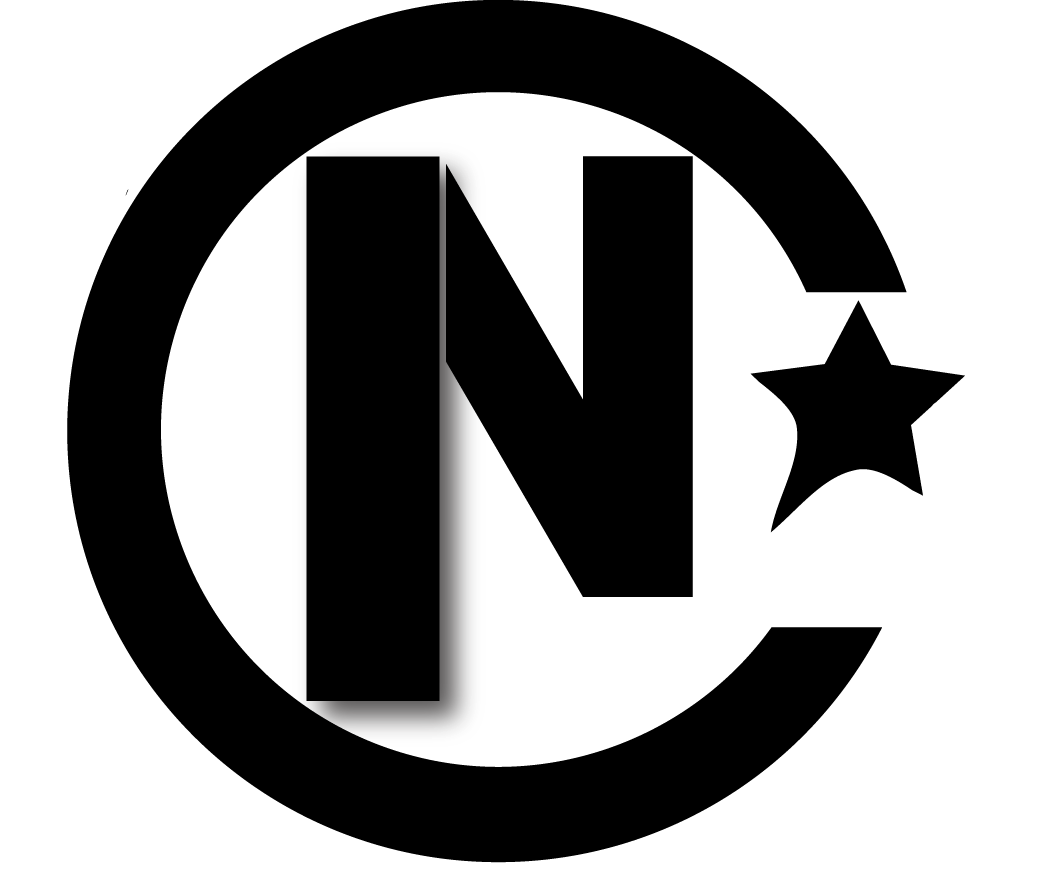
Band logo

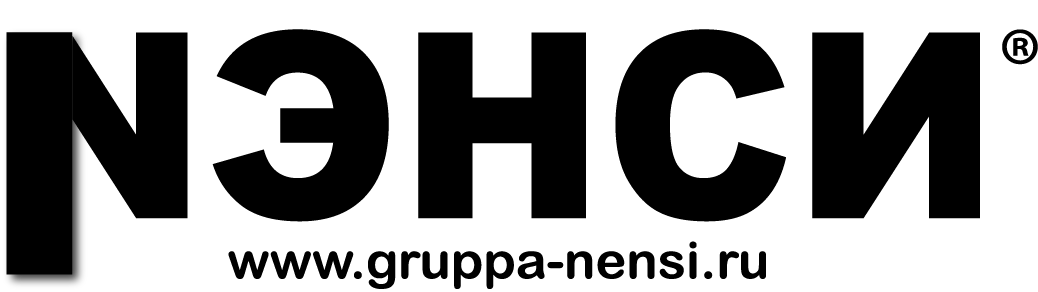

Nensi (Нэнси) is a Ukrainian musical band founded in 1992 in the city of Kostiantynivka (Donetsk Oblast) by the singer-songwriter Anatoly Bondarenko. The band is best known for its song "Dym sigaret s mentolom" ("Дым сигарет с ментолом and чистый лист").

Nensi received positive feedback from music critics, being credited as a successful project of contemporary pop-culture.

On 18 October 2018, Sergey Bondarenko died at the age of 31.

== Discography ==
Year	Title
1993	"Дым сигарет с ментолом"
1994	"Чёрный Кадиллак часть 1"
1994	"Чёрный Кадиллак часть 2"
1995	"Новые и лучшие песни группы "Нэнси" часть 1"
1996	"Новые и лучшие песни группы "Нэнси" часть 2"
1997	"Свадьба"
1997	"Ты далеко, или волшебный мир"
1998	"Новые и лучшие песни группы "Нэнси" часть 3"
1998	"Туман, туман"
2000	"Ромео"
2000	"Новые и лучшие песни группы "Нэнси" часть 4"
2001	"Луна"
2001	"Ива"
2001	"Новые и лучшие песни группы "Нэнси" часть 5 "ЛАДА""
2002	"Мой огонёк"
2002	"Новые и лучшие песни группы "Нэнси" часть 6 "КОРАБЛИК""
2003	"Нэнсимьюзик точка ру"
2004	"Прочти, пожалуйста, мое письмо!"
2004	"Новые и лучшие песни группы "Нэнси" часть 7"
2005	"Сантанави"
2005	"Новые и лучшие песни группы "Нэнси" часть 8"
2008	"Дым сигарет с ментолом 15 лет" (юбилейный)
2012	"Вечерочкиночки" (премьера 29 сентября 2012).

== Videos ==
Year	Title
1993	"Как любил я тебя"
1993	"Пьяный день рождения"
1994	"В первый раз"
1994	"Калина красная"
1994	"Милая"
1994	"Чёрный Кадиллак"
1995	"Отель"
1996	"Дым сигарет с ментолом"
1996	"Чистый лист"
1997	"Ты далеко"
1998	"Туман-туман"
2000	"Ромео"
2000	"Прочти, пожалуйста, моё письмо"
2000	Муз-Тв "Горько плакала ива"
2001	"Зачем"
2007	"Светлана"
2010	"Ночной коралл"
2012	"Моя любимая Женщина" (Lyric video)
2012	"Ты научи меня летать" (Lyric video)
2012	"Нэнси Люблю Кохаю I Love You!" (Official Music HD VIDEO) HD
2013	"Я стану ветром" (кинопостановочный клип)
2013	"Дед Мороз не придет..."
2013	"#Вечерочкиночки" (видеоклип live)
2013	"Моя любимая Женщина" (видеоклип live)

== Honours and awards ==
- 1996 – Best Russian band
- 2004 – Laureate of the contest "Боевое Братство"
- 2007 – Knight of the order "Служение искусству"
- 2010 – Medal "Талант и призвание"
