= Sujud Sutrisno =

Indonesian musician (1953–2018)

Sujud Sutrisno (September 22, 1953 – January 15, 2018) was a street musician or busker from Yogyakarta, Indonesia. He called himself "kendhang tunggal", which means "solo drummer". His music is based on his handheld drum complemented by his vocal.

== Biography ==
Sujud was born in 1953 into a family of artists. His father, Wirosuwito, was a cokekan (dance show) artist, and an expert in Karawitan from Klaten. Due to financial difficulties, Wirosuwito was forced to become street musician/busker, specialising in uyon-uyon (Javanese traditional songs and chants).

Sujud learned Karawitan from Wirosuwito. He realised that his favorite instrument was the kendang (drum), so he decided to specialise in drumming.

Sujud became a street singer to pay his way through school. Though he did not complete junior high school, he was eager to learn. He had been making money singing and playing percussion since the 1960s.

Sujud did not consider himself a street singer. Rather, he referred to himself as 'a door-to-door tax collector'. This was because, usually, he would go from one house to another, singing, hoping for the kindness of the residents. His great talent proved to be an enjoyable form of entertainment rather than annoyance, and hence the residents always responded positively to his music. When he went busking from door to door, children from the neighbourhood would follow him everywhere he went, and watched him. He was highly respected by other street musicians and artists. He said that the main difficulty in his musical career was the tropical rain, which prevented him to do his door-to-door work, as it was difficult to play the drum and hold an umbrella at the same time.

Like a true Javanese, Sujud believeed in the Javanese philosophy trimo ing pandum or accepting one's destiny. His fate, his says, is in God's hands. At the end of a performance, he never expected to be paid, but accepted what people gave him.

Sujud took the name Sutrisno only in adulthood, as is the Javanese custom.

Today, he lives alone in a rented house somewhere in Notoyudan, Yogyakarta. Since the death of his wife Swakidah, he has done all the housework himself but buys his meals from food stalls. He keeps to a "tight" schedule: singing 20 days a month and taking it easy the rest of the time.

== Music characteristics ==
As a soloist, drumming is not all about money for him, but also a spiritual endeavor. His concept is to make his music as stress reliever.

Sujud differs from other street singers in that he rearranges pop songs, mostly from the 1970s. He likes to make people laugh and often parodies popular songs.

His unique and rich music is simply based on a combination of his vocal and hand drumming. His performance is characterised by a continuous medley of pop song parody in Javanese and Indonesian language. Although the medley is played as a continuum, a syncopated drum motif is always played to mark a beginning of a new song. His performance is always totally improvised, and he never sings the same song twice. The improvised lyrics of his songs come out spontaneously, consisting of parodies, jokes, satire, social criticism, and sometimes vulgarity. He said that he expresses the lamentation of the commoners.

His voice has the characteristics of Javanese vocal technique. His drums beat in syncopated four-beat rhythms.

== Works and discography ==
- Street Music of Java, original music, recorded 1976–1978. This album is sold in the U.S. and Europe, however, the musicians (including Sujud) do not receive any royalties from the record label.
- Live in Bantul (2001) by Blass record

== Honors, awards and participation ==
- Performed in Mass Rally in Kraton Ngayogyakarta Hadiningrat in front of Sultan Hamengkubuwono X, 20 May 1998
- Kua Etnika, a music group headed by Jaduk Ferianto, honored Sujud by naming him Indonesia's "greatest street singer."
- Performer in First Indonesian International Drum Festival
- Live solo concert in Bantul, 25 April 2001
- Performer in 7th Yogyakarta Gamelan Festival (2002)
