= Uncomfortable (song) =

Halestorm song

Single by Halestorm

from the album Vicious
- Released: May 30, 2018
- Studio: Rock Falcon (Nashville, Tennessee)
- Genre: Pop metal; speed metal; hard rock
- Length: 3:40
- Label: Atlantic
- Songwriters: Lzzy Hale; Josh Smith; Joe Hottinger; Arejay Hale
- Producer: Nick Raskulinecz

Halestorm singles chronology
| "Mayhem" (2015) | "Uncomfortable" (2018) | "Do Not Disturb" (2018) |

Music video
- "Uncomfortable" on YouTube

"Uncomfortable" is a song by American hard rock band Halestorm from their fourth studio album, Vicious. The song was written by Lzzy and Arejay Hale, alongside Josh Smith and Joe Hottinger. It was recorded at Rock Falcon Studios in Nashville with producer Nick Raskulinecz. The song was released on May 30, 2018 as the album's lead single, through Atlantic Records.

"Uncomfortable" is a pop metal track with elements of speed metal and hard rock. The lyrics, delivered rapid-fire by Lzzy Hale, were inspired by her own struggles with trying to please other people, and call the listener to focus on what makes them happy. The song received generally positive reviews from music critics, who praised the energy and technical construction of the track, and received a nomination for Best Rock Performance at the 61st Annual Grammy Awards. It also had a strong commercial performance, appearing on the US Hot Rock & Alternative Songs chart at number 28 and the US Rock Airplay chart at number 17.

== Background and composition ==
Halestorm released their third studio album Into the Wild Life on April 14, 2015. This was followed by 2017's Reanimate 3.0: The Covers EP, produced by Nick Raskulinecz. When the band commenced work on their next album, they wrote and discarded 15 songs. Lead vocalist and guitarist Lzzy Hale was unhappy with the initial material; fearing that she was "paying way too much attention making everybody happy". Halestorm reunited with Raskulinecz for a series of jam sessions at his Nashville recording studio, Rock Falcon. "Uncomfortable" was the first song written for what would become Vicious. The song was written by band members Lzzy and Arejay Hale, Joe Hottinger, and Josh Smith.

Musically, "Uncomfortable" is a pop metal track, with elements of speed metal and hard rock. It is written in the key of C major at a tempo of 119 beats per minute. Lead guitarist Hottinger told Classic Rock that the main riff was written as "a joke", and kept at Raskulinecz's urging. Lzzy Hale wrote the melody and lyrics about a month after the initial writing sessions. The lyrics are a response to Hale's earlier worries about pleasing other people, with the message being: "You can't please everyone, there's always going to be someone disappointed, so you might as well make yourself happy and Be You". The vocal melody marks a departure from the usual anthemic stylings of Halestorm, relying on rapid-fire verses and a chorus centered on a vocal riff. It is set to an instrumental background of heavy electric guitar riffs and drum beats.

== Release and reception ==
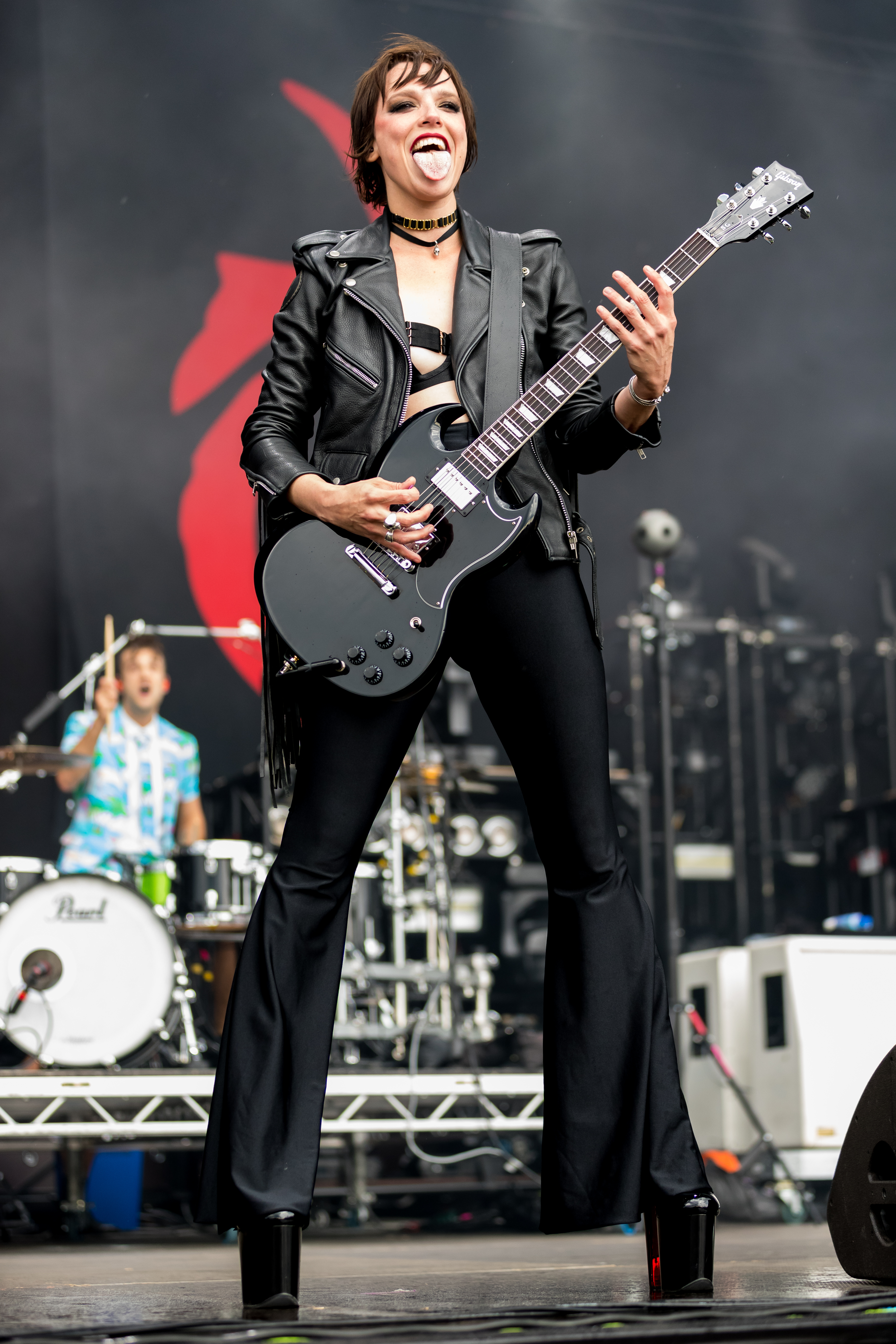
Vocalist Lzzy Hale wrote the lyrics to "Uncomfortable" after worrying that she was writing music to please other people, not for herself.

Halestorm released "Uncomfortable" as the lead single from Vicious on May 30, 2018, as part of the larger album announcement. Hottinger was happy with the band's choice to make "Uncomfortable" the first single, "because it's part of that whole idea of challenging things ... It's a good introduction to the record".

The song was released to positive reviews from music critics, with such descriptions as "brilliant", "blistering", and "high-octane". Axl Rosenberg of MetalSucks said, "It's been a hot minute since there's been a pop-metal song this well put together", while Robert Pasbani of Metal Injection said that "Uncomfortable "has all the ingredients for a great pop metal song that will surely be all over rock radio and SiriusXM Octane all this summer". Pasbani praised the "great riffing, crunchy drums, and a really fun vocal performance", the last of which he compared to Joan Jett. Hale, when asked whether Halestorm gets nervous about releasing new music, said: "You don't expect the worst, but you're prepared for the worst ... But [the reception to "Uncomfortable" has] been overwhelmingly positive, and I'm still, like, 'Where's the catch? What's happening here?'"

In their list of the best hard rock songs of 2018, Loudwire placed "Uncomfortable" at number 2, falling only behind A Perfect Circle's "Disillusioned". The track was also nominated for Best Rock Performance at the 2019 Grammy Awards, ultimately losing to Chris Cornell's "When Bad Does Good". "Uncomfortable" was the second Grammy nomination for Halestorm, following "Love Bites (So Do I)", which won Best Hard Rock/Metal Performance at the 2013 ceremony.

"Uncomfortable" had a strong commercial showing in the United States as well, spending 20 weeks on the US Billboard Mainstream Rock chart, and peaking at number one on August 25, 2018. The song also appeared on the US Hot Rock & Alternative Songs and Rock Airplay charts, peaking at numbers 28 and 17, respectively. "Uncomfortable" also appeared on the 2018 Billboard Year-End Mainstream Rock chart at number 15. Elsewhere, the song spent one week in October on the Canada Rock chart, reaching number 47.

=== Music video ===
The band released an official music video for "Uncomfortable" on the same day as the single. Directed by Evan Brace, who had previously worked with the bands Phantogram and Taking Back Sunday, the video shows the band in black and white, and utilizes double exposure to create a stark, gritty visual experience. On June 6, 2018, the band released behind the scenes footage from the making of the "Uncomfortable" video.

== Credits and personnel ==
Recording

- Recorded at Rock Falcon in Nashville, Tennessee.

Halestorm

- Lzzy Hale – songwriter, lead vocals, rhythm guitar, piano, synthesizer
- Joe Hottinger – songwriter, lead guitar, synthesizer, backing vocals
- Arejay Hale – songwriter, drums, backing vocals
- Josh Smith – songwriter, bass guitar, synthesizer, backing vocals

Technical

- Nick Raskulinecz – production
- Nathan Yarborough – engineer
- Nik Karpen – engineer
- Jordan Logue – assistant engineer
- Chris Lord-Alge – mixing
- Ted Jensen – mastering

Information taken from the Vicious liner notes.

== Charts ==
=== Weekly charts ===
Weekly chart performance for "Uncomfortable"
| Chart (2018) | Peak position |
|---|---|
| Canada Rock (Billboard) | 47 |
| US Hot Rock & Alternative Songs (Billboard) | 28 |
| US Rock & Alternative Airplay (Billboard) | 17 |

=== Year-end charts ===
Year-end chart performance for "Uncomfortable"
| Chart (2018) | Position |
|---|---|
| US Mainstream Rock (Billboard) | 15 |
