= 2018 in Swedish music =

The following is a list of notable events and releases of the year 2018 in Swedish music.

== Events ==
=== January ===
- 28 – The Gustav Lundgren Trio performed a tribute to Django Reinhardt at Stockholm Concert Hall.

=== February ===
- 3 – Melodifestivalen 2018 Semi-final 1 in Löfbergs Arena, Karlstad
- 10 – Melodifestivalen 2018 Semi-final 2 in Scandinavium, Gothenburg
- 17 – Melodifestivalen 2018 Semi-final 3 in Malmö Arena, Malmö
- 24 – Melodifestivalen 2018 Semi-final 4 in Fjällräven Center, Örnsköldsvik

=== March ===
- 3 – Melodifestivalen 2018 Second chance in Kristianstad Arena, Kristianstad
- 10 – Melodifestivalen 2018 Final in Friends Arena, Stockholm
- 16 – The Blue House Youth Jazz Festival started in Stockholm (March 16 – 18).

=== April ===
- 27 – ABBA announce that they have recorded some new songs, the first since 1983.

=== June ===
- 6 – The 26th Sweden Rock Festival started in Norje (June 6 – 9).

=== July ===
- 25 – The Norberg Festival opened (July 25 – 29).
- 27 – The Uppsala Reggae Festival started (July 27 – 28).

=== August ===
- 10
  - The Way Out West Festival started in Gothenburg (August 10 – 12).
  - The Malmöfestivalen opened in Malmö (August 10 – 17).

=== October ===
- 21 – The 50th Umeå Jazz Festival start (October 21 – 26).

== Albums released ==
=== January ===
Day	Album	Artist	Label	Notes	Ref.
5	Trident Wolf Eclipse	Watain	Century Media		
19	Contra La Indecisión	Bobo Stenson Trio (Anders Jormin, Jon Fält)	ECM	Produced by Manfred Eicher	

=== February ===
Day	Album	Artist	Label	Notes	Ref.
23	A Novel Of Anomaly	Andreas Schaerer	ACT	Produced by Siggi Loch	

=== April ===
Day	Album	Artist	Label	Notes	Ref.
27	Större	Molly Sandén	unknown		

=== June ===
Day	Album	Artist	Label	Notes	Ref.
8	So Sad So Sexy	Lykke Li	RCA	Executive producer Malay	

=== July ===
Day	Album	Artist	Label	Notes	Ref.
18	e.s.t. songbook - Volume 2 - Buch	Esbjörn Svensson Trio	ACT		

=== September ===
Day	Album	Artist	Label	Notes	Ref.
28	Summerwind	Lars Danielsson	ACT	Produced by Siggi Loch	

=== October ===
Day	Album	Artist	Label	Notes	Ref.
26	Christmas With My Friends VI	Nils Landgren	ACT	Produced by Nils Landgren with Johan Norberg	
26	My Soul Kitchen	Ida Sand	ACT	Produced by Nils Landgren and Siggi Loch	

== Deaths ==
January

- 16 – Javiera Muñoz, singer (born 1977).

February

March

- 3 — Kenneth Gärdestad, pop songwriter (born 1948).
- 5 — Kjerstin Dellert, opera singer (born 1925)
- 26 – Jerry Williams, actor and rock singer (born 1942).

April

- 3 – Lill-Babs or Barbro Svensson, singer and actress (born 1938).
- 20 – Avicii or Tim Bergling, Swedish DJ and record producer (born 1989)

May

June

- 26 – Bo Nilsson, composer (born 1937).

July

- 9 – Stefan Demert, singer and songwriter (born 1939).

August

September

- 9 – Frank Andersson, entertainer and wrestler, complications during heart surgery (born 1956).

== See also ==
- 2018 in Sweden
- Music of Sweden
- Sweden in the Eurovision Song Contest 2018
- List of number-one singles and albums in Sweden (see 2018 section on page)
