= 2018 in Icelandic music =

The following is a list of notable events and releases of the year 2018 in Icelandic music.

== Events ==
=== March ===
- 3 – The artist and song for Iceland in the Eurovision Song Contest 2018 is decided. Ari Ólafsson wins, with the song "Heim".
- 16 – The 6th Sónar Reykjavík festival start (March 16–17).

=== July ===
- 4 – The 19th Folk music festival of Siglufjörður start in Siglufjörður (July 4–8).
- 11 – The 14th Eistnaflug festival start in Neskaupstaður (July 11–14).

=== November ===
- 7 – The Iceland Airwaves music festival opens, running until 10 November. Guests include Blood_Orange, Cashmere Cat and Stella Donnelly.

== Deaths ==
February

- 9 – Jóhann Jóhannsson, film composer, The Theory of Everything, Arrival, Sicario (born 1969).

August

- 21 – Stefán Karl Stefánsson, singer, LazyTown (born 1975).

== See also ==
- 2018 in Iceland
- Music of Iceland
- Iceland in the Eurovision Song Contest 2018
