= Allah Thérèse =

Ivorian singer (died 2020)

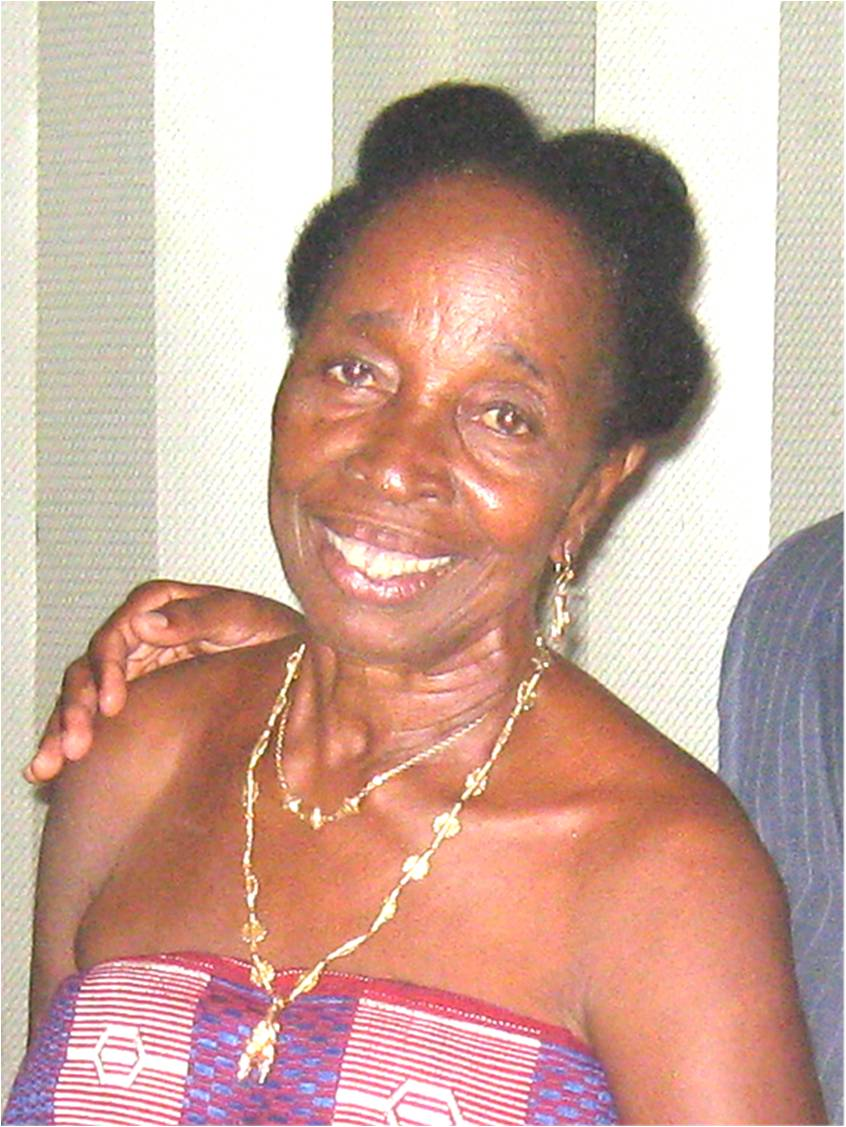
- Allah Thérèse at journées des NTIC in 2009
- Born: Thérèse Allah
- Died: 19 January 2020; Djékanou
- Other name: Allah Thérèse
- Occupations: Singer; songwriter; musician
- Years active: 1956–2020
- Musical career
- Origin: Toumodi, Ivory Coast
- Genres: Agbiro
- Instrument: Vocals

Thérèse Allah, better known as Allah Thérèse (died January 19, 2020), was a traditional singer from the village of Gbofia in the sub-prefecture of Toumodi (central Ivory Coast). A pioneer of traditional Ivorian music, Allah Thérèse was made a Knight of the Ivorian Order of Merit in 2014. She was known for her signature hairstyle, "Akôrou Koffié" (meaning "the wife of the spider" in Baoule). In her native language of Baoule, Allah translated to iroko.

She formed a musical duet with her husband, the accordionist N'Goran-la-loi until the latter's death on 20 May 2018.

== Career and early recognition ==
Allah Thérèse performed with N’Goran from 1956, and the duo enjoyed significant popularity in the 1960s and ‘70s. As of 2005, the duo produced six albums together. Their seventh and final album was released on May 21, 2018, the day after N’Goran’s death. The album is titled "Bé gnanssou moayé", which translates to “I had grace” in Baoulé.

== Legacy and retirement ==
In 2014, she was made a Knight of the Ivorian Order of Merit, a distinction which came with a monthly pension and a second house in her home village of Gbofia, in the sub-prefecture of Toumodi. Allah Thérèse reflected on her career in a 2018 interview, stating that she was satisfied with her life's work and her commitment to upholding tradition through music. She explained her absence from the stage in later years, stating that she was no longer up to the rigors of live performance. In the same interview Allah Thérèse commented that her commitment to music was her legacy, although she lamented the fact that she had no children. “I made the commitment to sing to immortalize my life. I feel happy when my fans call me mom. In my family, we are three girls who have not had children."

Allah Thérèse stated her intention to retire after her husband died of natural causes on May 20, 2018. She stated that "I can not go on anymore, we make a team, we make a pair, without him I can not continue to play”.

On January 19, 2020 Allah Thérèse was admitted to the general hospital of Djékanou where she died. Her death was lamented by Ivorian President.
