= Rocket Fuel Is The Key =

US musical group

- Origin: Kansas City, Missouri, U.S.
- Genre: Noise rock
- Years active: 1994–present
- Label: Crustacean Records
- Members: Billy Johnson; Scott McNearney; Vic Denson
- Past members: Ed Przychodzki
- Website: http://www.rocketfuelisthekey.com/

Rocket Fuel Is The Key are an American noise rock band from Kansas City, Missouri, United States.

== History ==
Rocket Fuel Is The Key formed in early 1994 when guitarist Scott McNearney moved to Kansas City with the desire to start a music career. After bringing in Ed Przychodzki on drums and Vic Denson on bass guitar, the lineup for the band was finished six months later. Following the creation of a demo and extensive touring the band they were approached by a New York label to record their debut album.

Following recording in both New York and Minneapolis their debut "Consider it Contempt" was completed. Shortly before the release of the album Przychodzki left the band citing creative differences. The band then sought out a replacement for the subsequent tour of the album, drafting in Billy Johnson.

Reception to both the tour and the album were good but as the band were preparing to enter the studio to record their second album the demands of the label for a "pop record" forced the band to end their contract and seek out a different label.

Distractions got in the way of the search for a new label and the band split ways in 1998 with Denson joining the band Cotton, Johnson playing with Frogpond, Onward Crispin Glover and Shots Fired and McNearney moving to Austin, Texas and starting Vegas Amateur and Corruption Is King.

However, due to demand from the fans the band reunited in 2004 to record their follow-up album Stroke of Genius on Crustacean Records with the album finally released in 2006.

Drummer Billy Johnson, who was also a member of Reggie and the Full Effect, died on February 13, 2018.

== Members ==
- Billy Johnson - Drums (d. 2018)
- Scott McNearney (AKA Durgin) - Guitar and Vocals
- Vic Denson - Bass

== Past members ==
- Ed Przychodzki - Drums ('94-'96)

== Discography ==
=== Studio albums ===
- Consider it Contempt (1996)
- Stroke of Genius (2006)
