= Jill Janus =

American heavy metal singer (1975–2018)

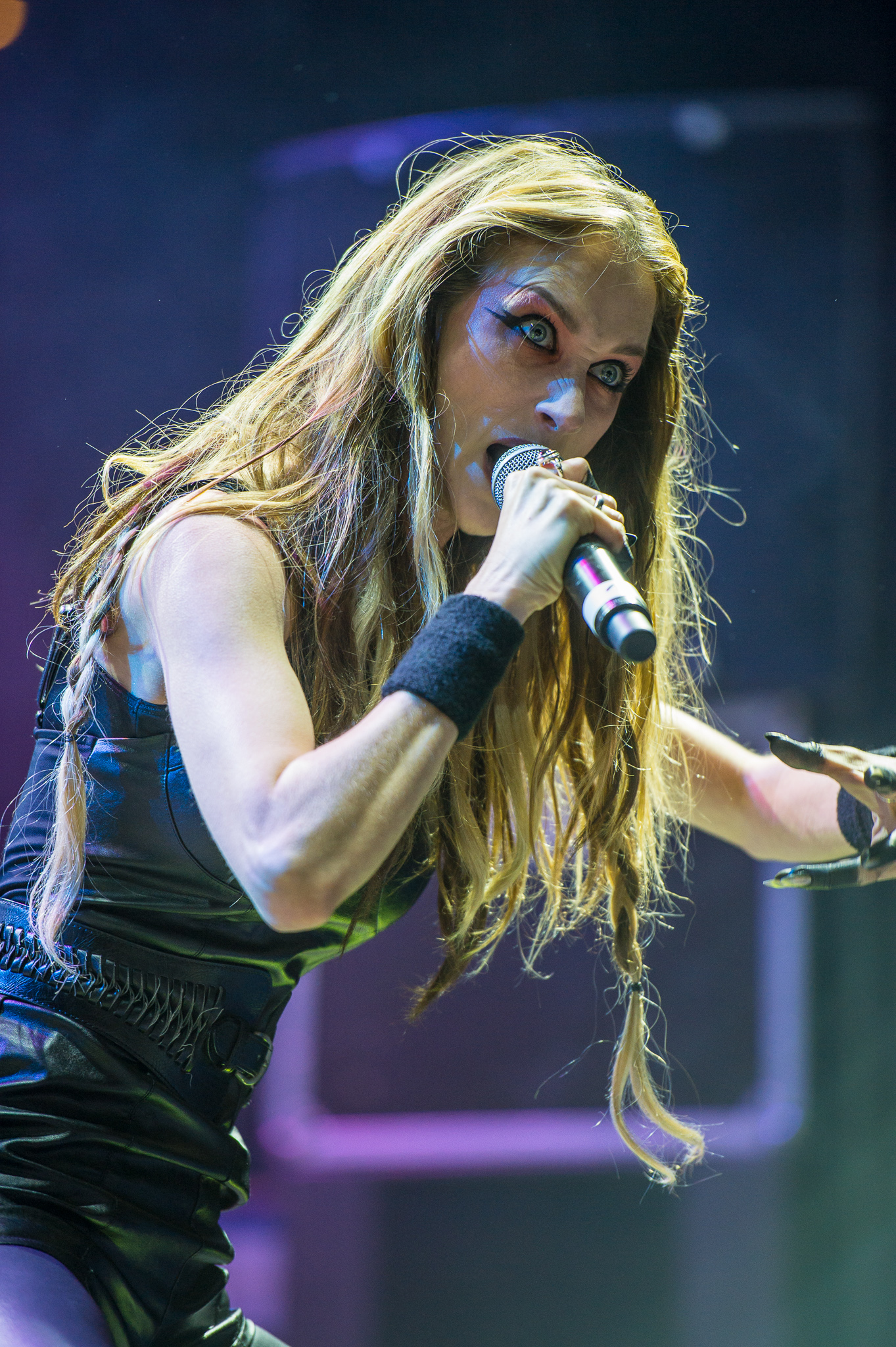
- Janus in 2014

Background information
- Also known as: Penelope Tuesdae
- Born: Jill Janiszewski; September 2, 1975; New York, U.S.
- Died: August 14, 2018 (aged 42) Portland, Oregon, U.S.
- Genre: Heavy metal
- Occupations: Singer, songwriter
- Years active: 1998–2018
- Formerly of: Huntress, The Starbreakers, Chelsea Girls

Jill Janus (née Janiszewski; September 2, 1975 – August 14, 2018) was an American singer who was the lead vocalist of heavy metal bands Huntress, The Starbreakers and Chelsea Girls.

== Early life and education ==
Janus was born in the Catskills Mountains and practiced paganism throughout her childhood. Growing up, she began singing opera before becoming interested in thrash metal as a teen. For her post-secondary education, Janus attended the American Musical and Dramatic Academy.

== Career ==
Janus started her music career working as a topless disc jockey under the name Penelope Tuesdae. She also worked in cabaret at the Windows on the World until the night before the September 11 attacks in New York. In 2003, Janus began her career in metal as a member of Vexy Strut and remained with the band until 2006. In 2009, she recruited members of the metal band Professor to join her newly formed band Huntress.

With Huntress, she was the lead singer during the band's three studio albums, the last of which was Static in 2015. In the fall of 2015, Janus announced to social media that Huntress was breaking up. She was later refuted by the band's guitarist Blake Meahl, citing her mental health issues.

Apart from her albums with Huntress, Janus filled in for Amon Amarth's lead singer Johan Hegg during a 2015 co-tour with Huntress. Janus's other projects outside of Huntress included membership of cover bands Chelsea Girls and The Starbreakers as their lead singer. She also co-wrote Victory: The Rock Opera with guitarist Angus Clark. Janus also recorded vocals for Brian Posehn's album Grandpa Metal, which was released in 2020, featuring her performances on the song "Goblin Love" as well as a cover of "Take On Me", the latter of which was released in November 2019.

== Artistry ==
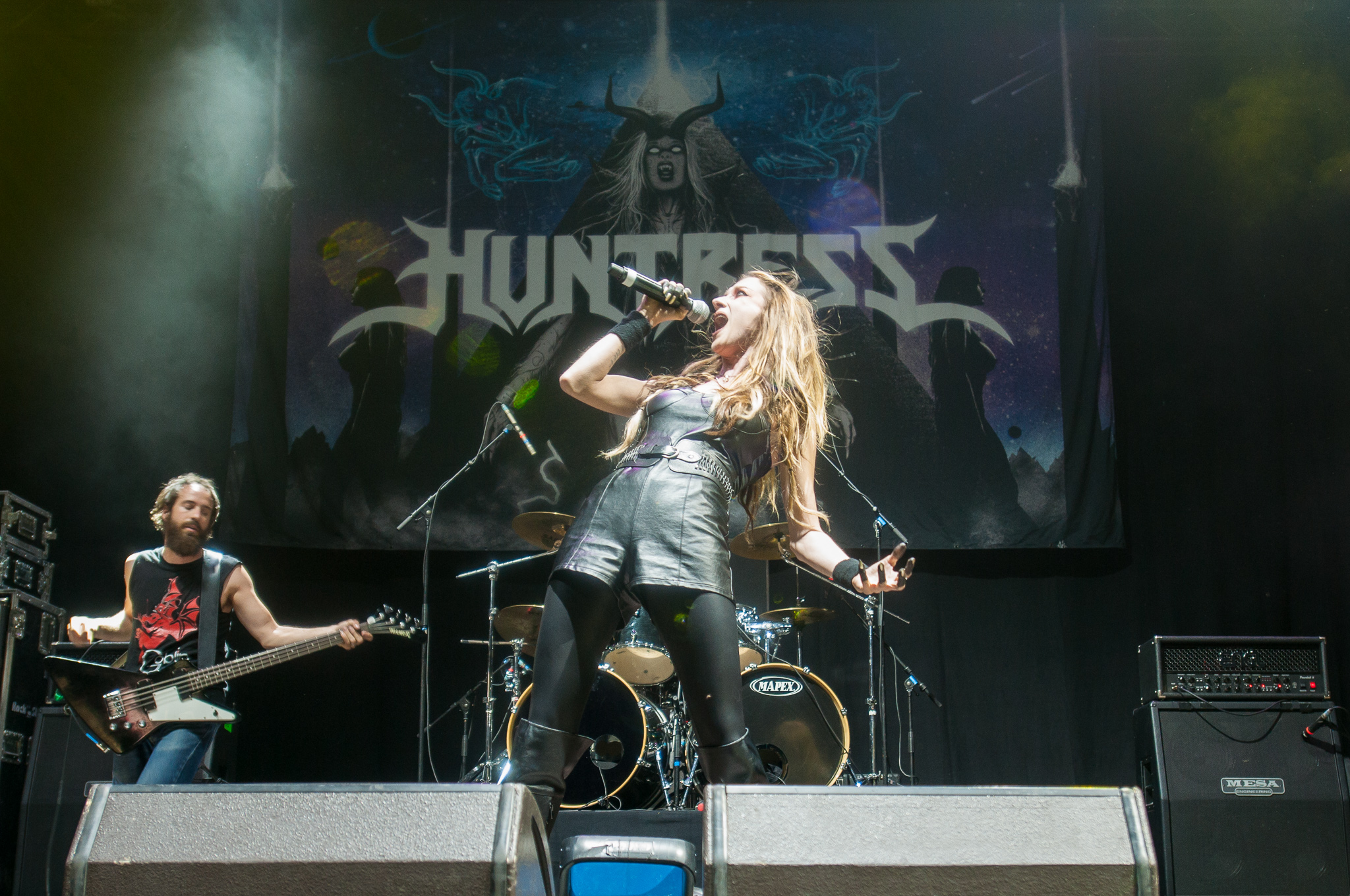
Janus with Huntress at Rock im Park 2014

Janus's musical influences ranged from rock to heavy metal. In rock, Janus named Ann Wilson as an influence while citing Freddie Mercury as one of her vocal inspirations. With heavy metal, Janus listed Rob Halford, King Diamond and Jared Warren as a few of her favourite singers. Janus said she had a four octave vocal range as a coloratura soprano. While she was in Huntress, Janus stated that each Huntress album respectively focused on a part of her life. Janus based each of the Huntress' albums on a part of the Triple Goddess in neopaganism.

== Personal life ==
In 2015, Janus disclosed to Revolver that she had been living with bipolar disorder since her early teens, and had made numerous suicide attempts, as early as age of 16. She was diagnosed with bipolar disorder at age 20, then later diagnosed with schizoaffective disorder. Later in her life, she experienced dissociative identity disorder, schizophrenia and alcoholism.

That same year, Janus underwent a hysterectomy after she was diagnosed with uterine cancer.

=== Death ===
On August 14, 2018, Janus died by suicide near Portland, Oregon. Although some sources claim she died at the age of 43, she stated that she was born in September 1975, making her 42 years old at the time of her death.

== Discography ==
=== With Huntress ===
Studio albums

- Spell Eater (2012)
- Starbound Beast (2013)
- Static (2015)

EPs

- Off with Her Head (2010)
- Eight of Swords (2011)
