= Umbayee =

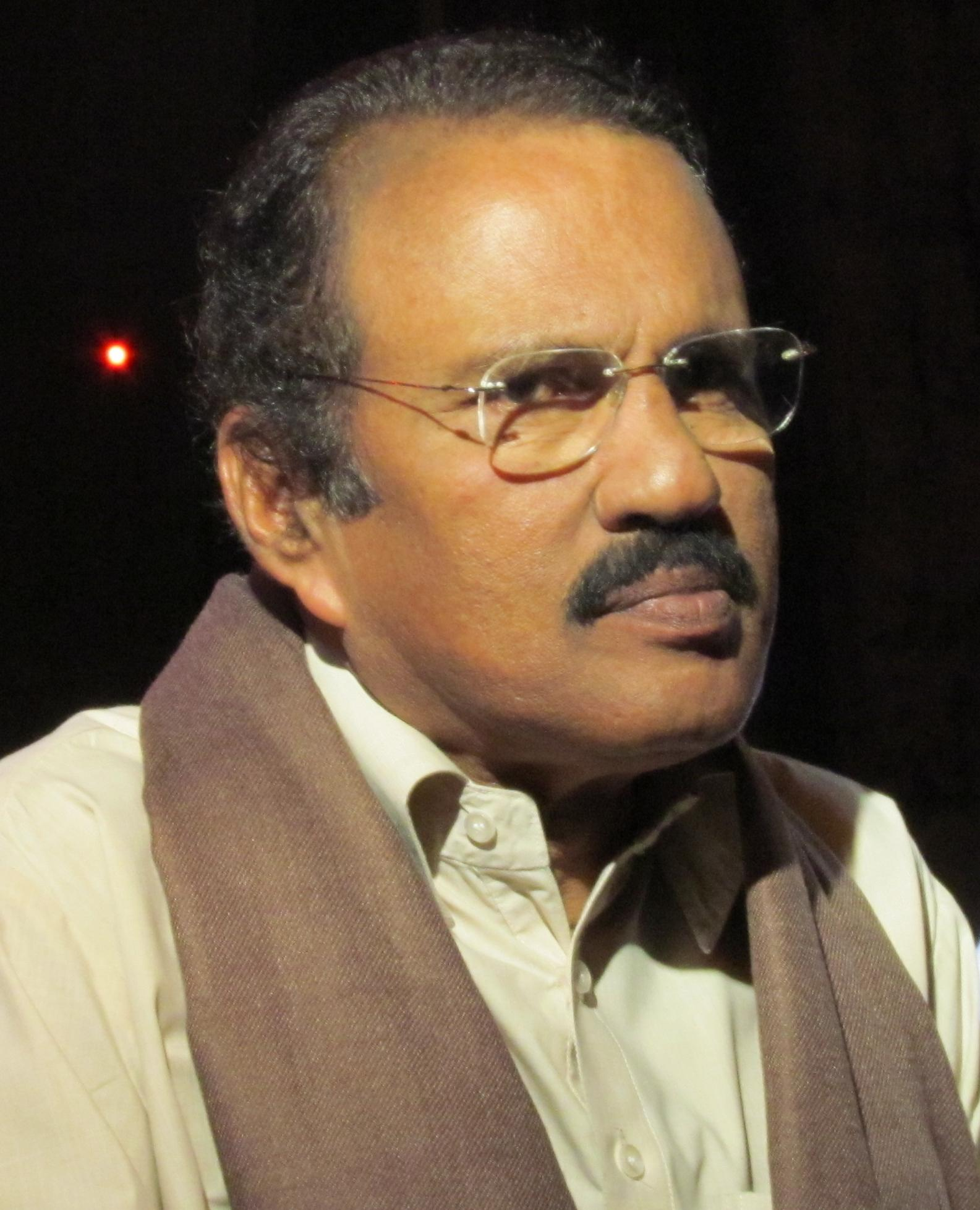
- Umbayee

Background information
- Born: P. A. Ibrahim; 1950; Mattancherry, Travancore–Cochin present-day Ernakulam, Kerala, India
- Died: 1 August 2018 (aged 67–68) Aluva, Kerala, India
- Genre: Malayalam ghazal
- Occupations: Singer, composer
- Instruments: Pump organ, Keyboard, Tabla
- Spouse: Haseeba (m. 1977)

P. A. Ibrahim (1950 – 1 August 2018), popularly known as Umbayee was an Indian folk musician and composer, associated with the Ghazal genre. Born in Mattancherry, Kerala, Umbayee is known for his unique style of singing. He died on 1 August 2018 in Aluva.

== Early years ==
Umbayee was born in 1950 in Mattanchery near Kochi. His real name was P. Abu Ibrahim. As a child Umbayee did not have a supportive environment towards music. His father was vehemently opposed to his son being inclined to music. Ultimately Umbayee failed in his exams thereby ending his school life. Seeing his son distracted by music, father packed Ibrahim off to Bombay (now Mumbai) where his (Umbayee's) uncle was a seaman and made him a trainee electrician. Being sent to Bombay was a decision which changed his life. He met Ustad Munawar Ali Khan who accepted Ibrahim as his disciple. Ibrahim studied music with Ustad for about 7 years without any interruption.

== Musical influences ==
Umbayee said "Mattancherry was a melting pot of music. There was music all around. You only had to find it."

Similar to the youth at the time, Ibrahim's inspiration had been Mehboob, who was a natural and enigmatic singer. During those times most of the legendary Hindustani musicians visited Mattancherry. Ibrahim used to be doing odd jobs in Abdul Khader Vakil's house where those musicians stayed. He listened to their discussions and music. According to Umbayee "That was the beginning".

Once he got a chance to listen to Pandit Ravi Shankar and Ustad Alla Rakha ‘live’ at Mattancherry. After which Ibrahim understood what he was capable of other than playing Tabla. He realised "There was so much to learn. What I was doing was childish".

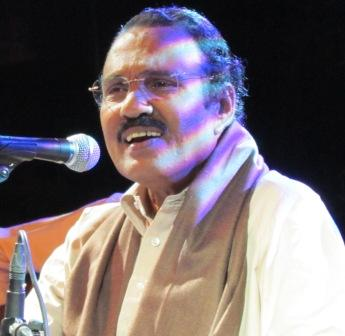
Umbayee in the Ghazal Night hosted in connection with Sharjah International Book Fair on 22 November 2011

== Personal life ==
Umbayee married Haseeba on 08 May 1977. They had three children, Shailaja, Sabitha and Sameer.

== Death ==
Umbayee died on 01 August 2018 at a private hospital in Aluva. He was being treated for multiple health problems for the past seven months. He was in the final stage of lung cancer.

== Albums ==
- Akale Mounam Pol
- Gazalmaala
- Hrudayaraagam
- Ithuvare Sakhee Ninne Kaathirunnu
- Madhuramee Gaanam
- Mehboob
- Nandi Pranaya Sakhi Nandi
- Orikkal Nee Paranju
- Oru Mukham Maathram
- Paaduka Saigal Paadoo
- Phir Vahee Shyaam
- Pranaamam Mehboob Ororma
