= Ed Simons (conductor) =

American violinist and conductor (1917–2018)

- Born: February 1, 1917
- Died: June 26, 2018 (aged 101)
- Occupation(s): Conductor, musician
- Instrument: Violin
- Years active: 1920s–2018

Edward Simons (February 1, 1917 – June 26, 2018) was an American classical violinist and conductor who was the oldest active conductor in the United States. He started his career in the 1940s and continued conducting until his death.

== Early life ==
Simons said his love for music started before he was born, hearing Mozart symphonies on a Victrola.

He grew up in Pittsburgh, Pennsylvania, and was playing violin by age nine. He heard classical symphonies from his father's records, jazz on the radio, and gospel from a neighborhood Baptist church. He played with local groups and the Pittsburgh Symphony Orchestra.

He received some formal lessons, but mostly taught himself to play, using library books.

== Career ==
Simons served in the Navy in World War II, joining a military band. In this capacity he played for President Harry S. Truman aboard the U.S.S. Augusta.

After the war he moved to New York City and played with the American Ballet Theatre, conducted by Max Goberman. Simons began secretly studying the orchestral scores. Goberman found out – and gave him a chance at the podium, even though he had no conducting experience. It went well, and Goberman gave him his first conducting job: the Frank Loesser musical Where's Charley?.

He went on to conduct eight Broadway shows between 1948 and 1964, including My Fair Lady and Camelot. He was described by The New York Times as "the best conductor in jazz".

In 1952 Simons founded the Suburban Symphony in Rockland County, New York, later known as the Rockland Symphony Orchestra. He was the conductor for over 60 years, and continued to conduct the orchestra at least once a year. In September 2017, he conducted a concert at 100 years of age.

From 1965 to the late 1980s, he taught music appreciation at Rockland Community College.

== Personal life ==
Simons married Janet Kelly Simons, a violist and pianist.

In 1950, he and Janet helped found Skyview Acres, a cooperative community in a rural area north of New York City; he lived there until his death.

In 1956, they founded the Community Music School, now the Rockland Conservatory of Music, where he taught violin.

Janet died in 1997.

His daughter Jo wrote a book about him that incorporates stories from his many years of conducting and teaching.

He turned 100 in February 2017. He died in June 2018 at the age of 101.
