= Huntress (band) =

American heavy metal band

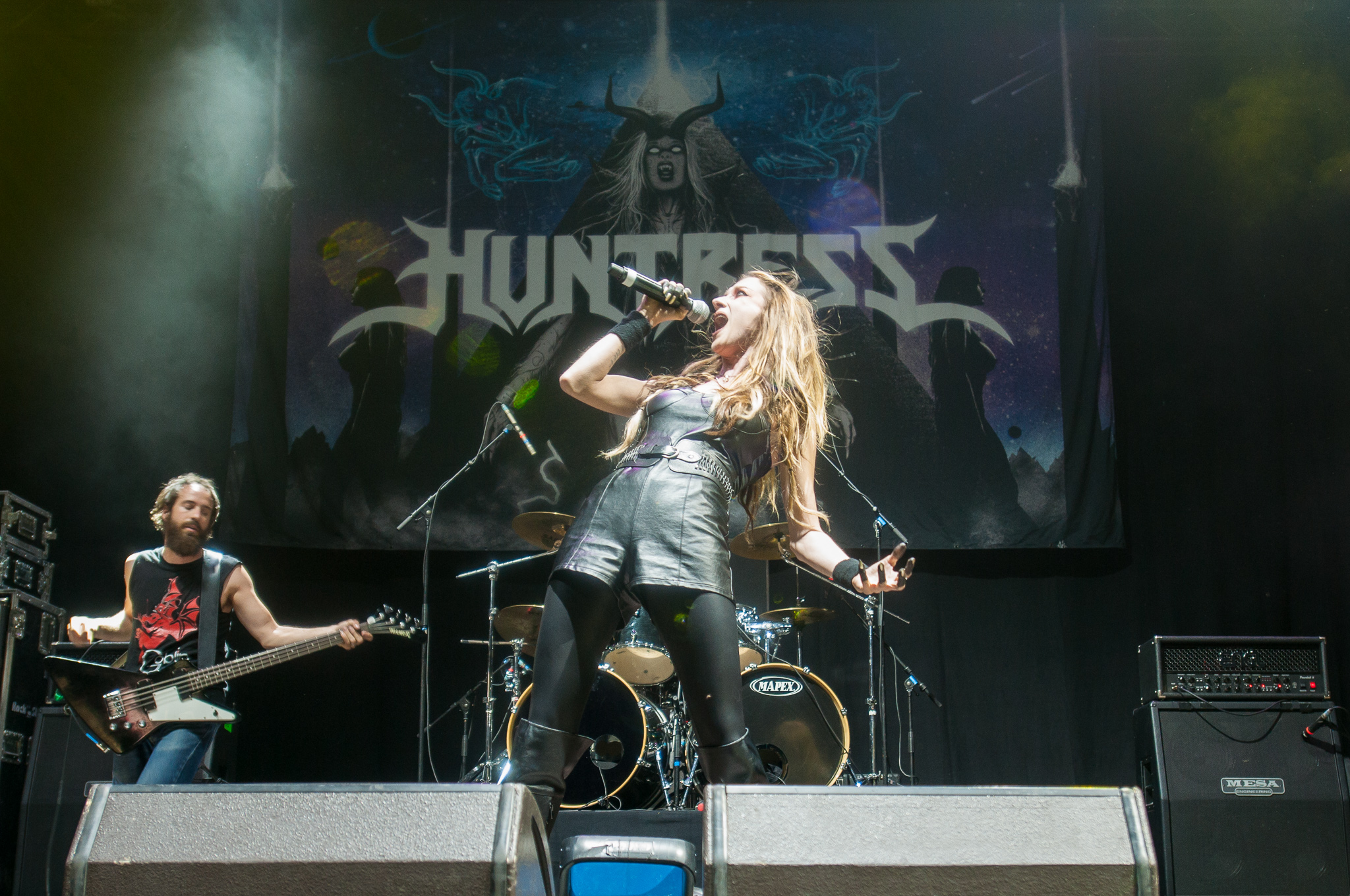
- Huntress at Rock im Park 2014

Background information
- Origin: Highland Park, Los Angeles, U.S.
- Genres: Heavy metal
- Years active: 2009–2018
- Label: Napalm
- Past members: Jill Janus; Blake Meahl; Eli Santana; Tyler Meahl; Eric Harris; Ian Alden; Greg Imhoff; Sean Ford; Carl Wierzbicky; Anthony Crocamo; Spencer Jacob

Huntress was an American heavy metal band. It was founded in the underground music scene of Highland Park, Los Angeles when lead vocalist Jill Janus moved to Los Angeles where she met an underground metal band called 'Professor' in 2009. Huntress was signed by Napalm Records in November 2011. A debut EP Off with Her Head was released in 2010. On December 27, 2011, they released their first single, "Eight of Swords", to promote their debut album, Spell Eater.

In October 2015, Janus posted a now-deleted note on Facebook announcing the band was coming to an end, and that she would continue to make music on her own. Lead guitarist Blake Meahl, however, dismissed her statement as a consequence of her health and mental issues, and said the band would continue to perform. On August 14, 2018, Jill Janus died by suicide.

== Style ==
The band's music has been observed as classic British heavy metal with influences of death, doom and thrash. The songs featured frequent screaming by lead vocalist Janus, who was classically trained and had a vocal range of four octaves.

== Band members ==
- Jill Janus – lead vocals (2009–2018; her death)
- Blake Meahl – lead guitar, backing vocals (2009–2018)
- Eli Santana – rhythm guitar, backing vocals (2014–2018)
- Tyler Meahl – drums (2014–2018)
- Eric Harris – bass (2010–2012, 2016–2018)
- Ian Alden – bass (2012–2015), rhythm guitar (2009–2012)
- Greg Imhoff – bass (2009–2010)
- Sean Ford – drums (2009–2010)
- Carl Wierzbicky – drums (2010–2014)
- Anthony Crocamo – rhythm guitar (2012–2013)
- Spencer Jacob Grau – bass (2015–2016)

Timeline

== Discography ==
Studio albums

Title	Album details	Peak chart positions	Sales
Title	Album details	US Heat	Sales
Spell Eater	Released: April 27, 2012; Label: Napalm Records; Formats: CD, LP, digital download	—	US: 1,050+
Starbound Beast	Released: July 2, 2013; Label: Napalm Records; Formats: CD, LP, digital download	12	US: 3,280+
Static	Released: September 25, 2015; Label: Napalm Records; Formats: CD, LP, digital download	18	US: 1,225+

EPs

Title	Album details
Off with Her Head	Released: March 30, 2010; Label: Self-released; Formats: digital download
Eight of Swords	Released: December 27, 2011; Label: Napalm Records; Formats: LP

Music videos

Year	Title	Directed	Album	Ref.
2011	"Eight of Swords"	Simon Chan	Eight of Swords	
2012	"Spell Eater"	Simon Chan	Spell Eater	
2013	"Zenith"	Phil Mucci	Starbound Beast	
2015	"Sorrow"		Static	

== Awards and nominations ==
Year	Nominated work	Award	Result
2014	"Zenith"	Revolver Golden Gods Awards Best Film & Video	Nominated
