= Tzimis Panousis =

Greek musician, comedian and actor

Tzimis Panousis Τζίμης Πανούσης
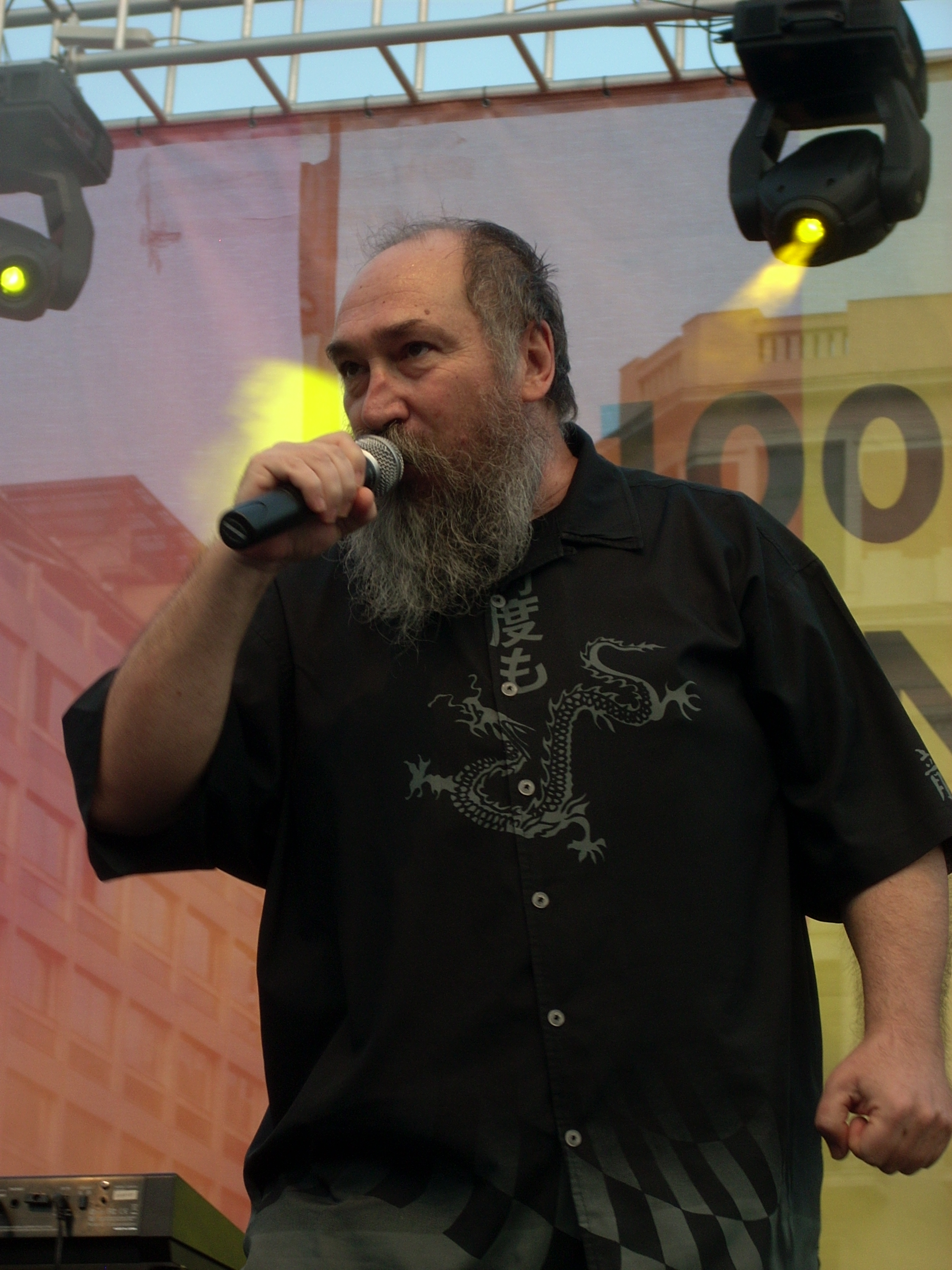
- Tzimis Panousis, 2009

Background information
- Born: Dimitrios Panousis; 12 February 1954; Ampelokipoi, Athens, Kingdom of Greece
- Died: 13 January 2018 (aged 63) Athens, Greece
- Genres: Comedy rock, rock
- Occupations: radio presenter, standup comedian, book writer
- Years active: 1980–2018
- Labels: Opera, Music Box International, Warner Music Greece, EMI-Columbia, MINOS-EMI, Afilokerdos A.E.
- Website: www.tzimakospanousis.gr

Tzimis Panousis (Greek: Δημήτρης "Τζίμης" Πανούσης; 12 February 1954 – 13 January 2018) was a Greek musician, stand-up comedian and occasional film and theater actor born on 12 February 1954 in the Ampelokipoi neighbourhood of Athens, where he spent most of his life. He is often seen as the modern-day Aristophanes. His fans usually refer to him as “Tzimakos” (little Jim). His first wife was Lili Achladioti with whom he had a son, Aris. He later married Athina Aidini and they had a daughter, Fotini.

== Discography ==
- 1980: Disco Tsoutsouni
- 1982: Mousikes Taxiarhies
- 1984: An I Giagia Mou Ihe Rouleman
- 1985: Hard Core (Live)
- 1986: Kaggela Pantou (First solo album after Mousikes Taxiarhies)
- 1987: Himia Ke Terata
- 1990: Doulies Tou Kefaliou (Live)
- 1992: O Roben Ton Hazon (Live)
- 1993: Vivere Pericolosamente
- 2000: Me Lene Popi (Live)
- 2002: Digma Dorean
- 2003: Dourios Ihos
- 2009: Tis Patridas Mou I Simea (Live)
- 2013: Obi-Obi-Bi
- 2013: Prosehos Voulgares
- 2014: Mastura ambient
- 2015: I katyusha tou KKE / Igiini Diastrofi

== Controversy ==
Panousis had several run-ins with the Greek authorities. His second album, Musical Brigades (Μουσικές Ταξιαρχίες in Greek), was briefly withdrawn from circulation in 1982 because of the ostensibly blasphemous lyrics of a love ballad. In 1984, censors placed beeps over some of the lyrics in Mousikes Taxiarhies's third album, An I Giagia Mou Ihe Rouleman (If My Grandma Had Wheel Bearings).

In 1997, a court battle with well-known Greek singer George Dalaras began. Panousis had frequently been making fun of Dalaras in his live shows, showing money coming out of his mouth whenever he sang. The court ruled that Panousis would be charged with a one million Drachmas fine (approximately $3,000) every time he mentioned Dalaras by name on-stage. Panousis's response to that, was to call him "the unmentionable" in his shows from then on, and use his famous on-stage quip, "Ladies and gentlemen, I have 3 million drachmas to spare: Dalaras, Dalaras, Dalaras!"

All this has contributed to the depiction of Panousis as a highly controversial artist. Some regarded him as a modern-day Aristophanes while many considered that his pranks and commentaries were of bad taste. Panousis often used offensive language, while the advertising posters of his depicted provocative images. In one instance, he replaced the cross of the Greek flag with a communist hammer and sickle, for which he was charged with a four-month probation. In another instance, he appeared dressed as a priest with a medallion hanging around his neck which depicted the head of a chicken instead of Mary. This elicited the angry reaction of Archbishop Christodoulos, the late head of the Church of Greece.

=== Accusations of antisemitism ===
Panousis was accused by the Central Board of Jewish Communities in Greece of expressing antisemitic views, not seldom in connection with his standpoint in the Israel-Palestine conflict. During an episode of his satirical show Δούρειος Ήχος ("Trojan Sound") at the radio channel City 99,5 in 2009, he used expressions such as "Jews - Pigs - Murderers [...] may you die a horrible death" and "[...] the jews control all the banks in the American empire, they control all of the show biz [...]", while also referring to the conflict in Gaza.

In 2013, Greek Jewish organisations were appalled by the use of a symbol consisting of the David star entwined with a swastika (the symbol itself is used by the Raelites) for the posters of his show "Troika Club". In relation to this symbol, Panousis has been using the term "nazi Jews" ("εβραιοναζί" in Greek) when describing current Israeli politics.

== Other activities ==
Panousis had hosted various radio shows for more than 15 years. He was also the author of six books (a peculiar type of sarcastic essays). Moreover, he had appeared in four movies: the most notable is The Dracula of Exarcheia (1983, directed by Nicos Zervos), where Panousis was the protagonist. From September 2008 to June 2009, he hosted a 30-minute radio show, called Dourios Ihos (Trojan Sound) at the radio station "City 99,5". The show was later hosted in "Radio Thema 98,9".

== Death ==
Panousis suffered a heart attack at his Athens home on 13 January 2018 and died on the way to the hospital, at age 63. He had previously been hospitalized after collapsing on stage in December 2017.
