= Stefan Demert =

Swedish singer and songwriter (1939–2018)

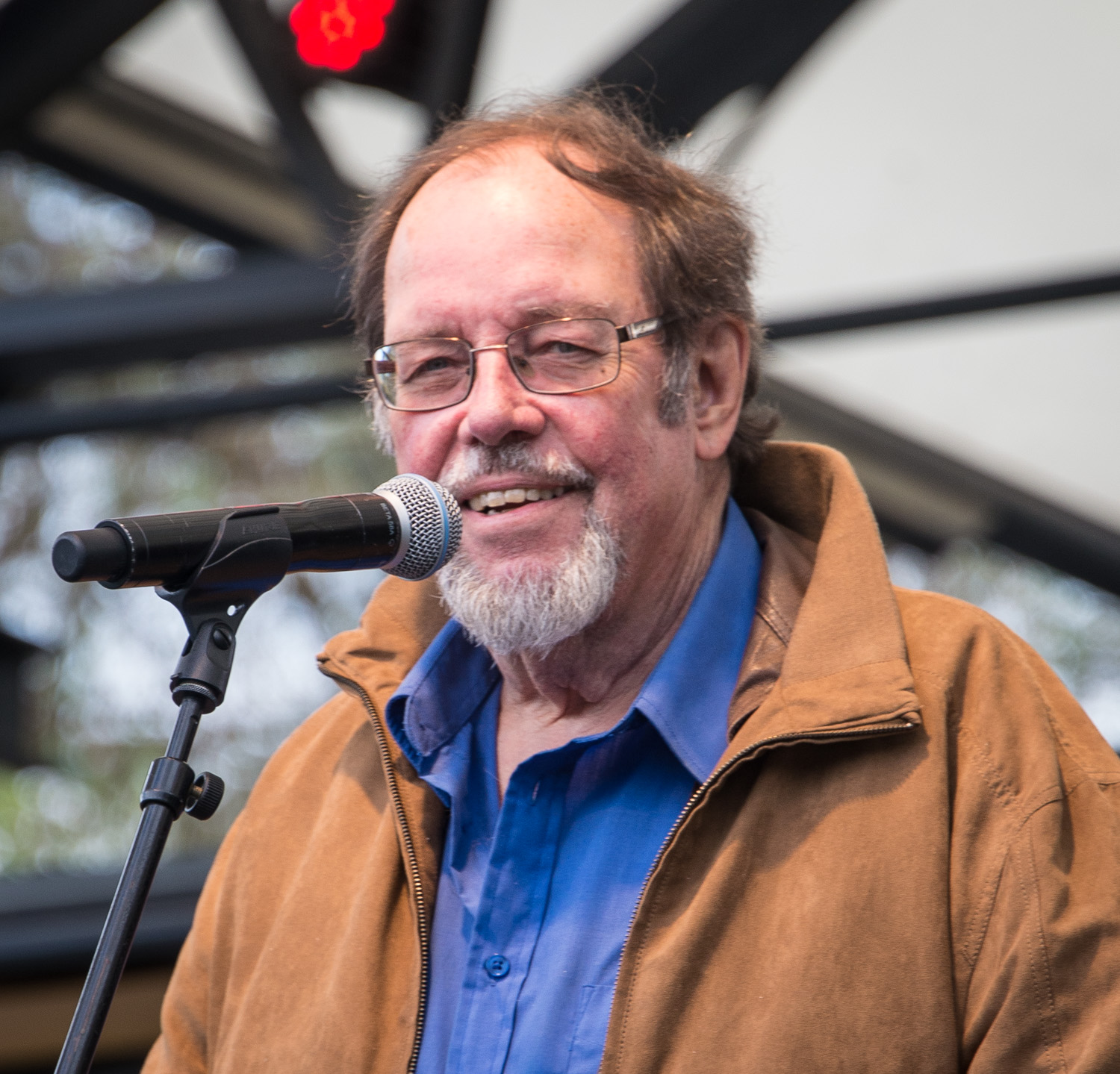
- Demert in 2015
- Born: Carl Stefan Demert; 15 December 1939; Nyköping, Sweden
- Died: 9 July 2018 (aged 78); Kungsbacka, Sweden
- Occupations: Singer, songwriter

Stefan Demert (15 December 1939 – 9 July 2018) was a Swedish singer and songwriter.

Demert was born in Nyköping. His debut album was Visor för smutsiga öron ("Songs for dirty ears") in 1970, which was certified gold, as was his second album, Marsch på er alla pannkakor.

His best-known songs include ”Balladen om den kaxiga myran”, ”Till SJ”, and ”Anna Anaconda” in which he sang together with his common law wife at the time, actress and singer Jeja Sundström. Several of his songs charted on Svensktoppen in the 1970s. Demert, Sundström, Sid Jansson and Björn Ståbi formed the group Visor & bockfot which toured Sweden, performing in folkparker around the country.

Demert received the Nils Ferlin Award in 2000 and the Ulf Peder Olrog Prize in 2004.

== Discography ==
- 1970 – Visor för smutsiga öron
- 1971 – Marsch på er alla pannkakor
- 1973 – Den siste ornitologen
- 1975 – Jeja & Stefan, with Jeja Sundström
- 1978 – Sidensammetrasalump, with Jeja Sundström
- 1981 – Till Anna, with Jeja Sundström
- 1985 – En afton i Ulvesund - Ord och inga visor
- 1993 – Katten och andra visor
- 2006 – 20 bästa
- 2014 – Till Carina
