= Ikimonogakari discography =

- Studio albums: 11
- Soundtrack albums: 18
- Compilation albums: 3
- Singles: 32
- Music videos: 33
- Live DVDs / Blu-ray discs: 4
- Music video collection DVDs / Blu-ray discs: 3
- Indie albums: 3

This is the discography of Japanese pop group Ikimonogakari, who have released three Indie albums prior to 2006, and eleven studio albums, three compilation albums, and numerous singles since joining Epic Records in 2006.

== Albums ==
=== Indie albums ===
Year	Information
2003	Makoto ni Senetsu Nagara First Album o Koshiraemashita... (誠に僭越ながらファーストアルバムを拵えました・・・): Released: 25 August 2003; Label: Thunder Snake Records (TSR-001)
2004	Nanairo Konnyaku (七色こんにゃく): Released: 28 August 2004; Label: Cubit Club (QBIX-11)
2005	Jinsei Sugoroku Dabe. (人生すごろくだべ。): Released: 25 May 2005; Label: Cubit Club (QBIX-15)

=== Studio albums ===
Year	Information	Peak (Japan)	First week sales	Sales
2007	Sakura Saku Machi Monogatari: Released: March 7, 2007; Label: Epic (ESCL-2910)	4	-	260,684
2008	Life Album: Released: February 13, 2008; Label: Epic (ESCL-3046)	2	-	252,599
2008	My Song Your Song: Released: December 24, 2008; Label: Epic (ESCL-3146)	1	166,871	463,382
2009	Hajimari no Uta: Released: December 23, 2009; Label: Epic (ESCL-3354, ESCL-3355, ESCL-3356)	1	200,286	561,957
2012	Newtral: Released: February 29, 2012; Label: Epic (ESCL-3827~8, ESCL-3829)	1	192,877	416,968
2013	I: Released: July 24, 2013; Label: Epic (ESCL-4089~90, ESCL-4091)	1	112,082	214,487
2014	Fun! Fun! Fanfare!: Release: December 24, 2014; Label: Epic (ESCL-4333)	1	101,211	127,807
2019	We Do: Released: December 25, 2019; Label: Epic (ESCL-5315, ESCL-5313～4)	2	37,106	
2021	Who?: Released: March 31, 2021; Label: Epic (ESCL-5507, ESCL-5505～5506)	4		
2023	○: Released: December 13, 2023; Label: Epic	5	13,240	
2025	Asobi: Released: April 30, 2025; Label: Epic	7	9,150	

=== Compilation albums ===
Year	Information	Peak (Japan)	Sales
2010	Ikimonobakari: Members Best Selection: Released: November 3, 2010; Label: Epic Records (ESCL-3525, ESCL-3526, ESCL-3527, ESCL-3528, ESCL-3529)	1	1,428,774
2012	Barādon: Released: December 19, 2012; Label: Epic Records (ESCL-4008〜9, ESCL-4010)	1	253,277
2016	Chō Ikimonobakari - Tennen Kinen Members BEST Selection: Released: March 15, 2016; Label: Epic Records (ESCL-5555, ESCL-5560)	1	212,063

== Singles ==
Year	Title		Release date	Peak positions	Oricon sales		Album
Year	Title		Release date	JPN	First week	Total	Album
2006	"Sakura"	"SAKURA"	March 15, 2006	17	3,090	59,758	Sakura Saku Machi Monogatari
2006	"Hanabi"	"HANABI" ("Fireworks")	May 31, 2006	5	24,113	56,584	Sakura Saku Machi Monogatari
2006	"Koisuru Otome"	"コイスルオトメ" ("Maiden In-Love")	October 18, 2006	15	7,061	15,226	Sakura Saku Machi Monogatari
2006	"Ryūsei Miracle"	"流星ミラクル" ("Meteor Miracle")	December 6, 2006	22	9,687	20,195	Sakura Saku Machi Monogatari
2007	"Uruwashiki Hito/Seishun no Tobira"	"うるわしきひと / 青春のとびら" ("Beautiful Person/Door of Youth")	February 14, 2007	17	9,397	18,695	Sakura Saku Machi Monogatari
2007	"Natsuzora Graffiti / Seishun Line"	"夏空グラフィティ / 青春ライン" ("Summer Sky Graffiti/Line of Youth")	August 8, 2007	10	16,471	37,754	Life Album
2007	"Akaneiro no Yakusoku"	"茜色の約束" ("Red Promise")	October 24, 2007	7	16,420	45,872	Life Album
2008	"Hana wa Sakura Kimi wa Utsukushi"	"花は桜 君は美し" ("The Flowers are Cherry Blossoms, You are Beautiful")	January 30, 2008	7	14,376	33,631	Life Album
2008	"Kaeritaku Natta yo"	"帰りたくなったよ" ("I'm Wanting to Go Home")	April 16, 2008	7	19,015	59,975	My Song Your Song
2008	"Blue Bird"	"ブルーバード"	July 9, 2008	3	31,593	90,267	My Song Your Song
2008	"Planetarium"	"プラネタリウム"	October 15, 2008	5	20,017	36,287	My Song Your Song
2008	"Kimagure Romantic"	"気まぐれロマンティック" ("Fickle Romantic")	December 3, 2008	4	23,662	46,937	My Song Your Song
2009	"Futari"	"ふたり" ("Two People")	May 27, 2009	7	30,174	58,803	Hajimari no Uta
2009	"Hotaru no Hikari"	"ホタルノヒカリ" ("Light of the Fireflies")	July 15, 2009	5	24,533	47,964	Hajimari no Uta
2009	"Yell / Joyful"	"YELL / じょいふる"	September 23, 2009	2	36,488	141,446	Hajimari no Uta
2009	"Nakumonka"	"なくもんか" ("Ain't Gonna Cry")	November 11, 2009	6	24,641	39,132	Hajimari no Uta
2010	"Nostalgia"	"ノスタルジア"	March 10, 2010	3	26,009	46,902	Members Best Selection
2010	"Arigatō"	"ありがとう" ("Thank You")	May 5, 2010	2	44,642	213,549	Members Best Selection
2010	"Kimi ga Iru"	"キミがいる" ("You're Here")	August 4, 2010	4	35,735	65,287	Members Best Selection
2011	"Warattetainda / New World Music"	"笑ってたいんだ ("I Want to Laugh") / NEW WORLD MUSIC"	July 20, 2011	5	32,743	56,636	Newtral
2011	"Aruite Ikō"	"歩いていこう" ("Let's Walk")	November 23, 2011	9	30,844	67,723	Newtral
2012	"Itsudatte Bokura wa"	"いつだって僕らは" ("We Always")	January 18, 2012	4	23,823	34,243	Newtral
2012	"Haru Uta"	"ハルウタ" ("Spring Song")	April 25, 2012	4	35,044	61,938	I
2012	"Kaze ga Fuiteiru"	"風が吹いている" ("The Wind is Blowing")	July 18, 2012	3	29,144	78,025	I
2013	"1 2 3 ~Koi ga Hajimaru~"	"1 2 3 ~恋がはじまる~" ("Love Begins")	June 5, 2013	9	17,816	24,911	I
2013	"Egao"	"笑顔" ("Smile")	July 10, 2013	5	31,324	54,114	I
2014	"Love Song wa Tomaranai yo"	"ラブソングはとまらないよ" ("Love Song Does Not Stop")	July 9, 2014	6	15,896	25,992	FUN! FUN! FANFARE!
2014	"Netsujou no Spectrum / Namida ga Kieru Nara"	"熱情のスペクトラム / 涙がきえるなら" ("Spectrum of Passion / If Tears Disappear")	October 15, 2014	10	15,638	30,269	FUN! FUN! FANFARE!
2014	"GOLDEN GIRL"	"GOLDEN GIRL"	November 12, 2014	13	11,960	16,189	FUN! FUN! FANFARE!
2015	"Anata"	"あなた" ("You")	May 13, 2015	10	14,311	19,117	Chou Ikimonobakari 〜Ten-nen kinen Members BEST Selection〜
2015	"Rabu to Pīsu! / Mudai 〜tōku e〜"	"ラブとピース！/夢題〜遠くへ〜"	November 3, 2015	10			Chou Ikimonobakari 〜Ten-nen kinen Members BEST Selection〜
2016	"Rasutoshīn / Bokura no yume"	"ラストシーン/ぼくらのゆめ" ("Last Scene / Our Dream")	August 24, 2016	10			

== Unreleased tracks ==
- Futari no Ai land (ふたりの愛ランド) (Online sales was started on 1 August 2006 by Sony Music Online Japan) - It is a cover version of a song by Yūko Ishikawa (石川優子, Ishikawa Yūko) and Chage.

== Other songs ==
- 14 Princess: Princess Princess Children (14プリンセス～Princess Princess Children～) (released on 8 March 2006 on SME Records): #10 Get Crazy!(In Japanese)
