= 2018 in Japanese music =

The year 2018 in Japanese music.

== Number ones ==
- Oricon number-one albums
- Oricon number-one singles
- Hot 100 number-one singles

== Awards ==
- 60th Japan Record Awards
- 2018 MTV Video Music Awards Japan

== Albums released ==
=== January ===
Date	Album	Artist	Genre	Labels
1	Best Generation	Generations from Exile Tribe	J-pop	Rhythm Zone
2	Westival	Johnny's West	J-pop	Johnny's Entertainment
3	Jack in the Box	Shuta Sueyoshi	Rap	Avex Trax
10	The Museum III	Nana Mizuki	J-pop / Anison	King Records
10	Boku Dake no Kimi (Under Super Best)	Nogizaka46	J-pop	Sony Music Japan
17	Everybody!!	WANIMA	Punk rock / Pop punk	Unborde
17	Violet	Pentagon	J-pop	Cube Entertainment Japan
24	Bokutachi wa, Ano Hi no Yoake wo Shitteiru	AKB48	J-pop	King Records
31	Countdown	Exo	J-pop	Avex Trax
31	Killer Tune Shikane yo	Golden Bomber	Rock / Pop punk / EDM	Zany Zap
31	Shiori Goto: Best	Shiori Niiyama	J-pop / Pop rock	Being

=== February ===
Date	Album	Artist	Genre	Labels
7	Hatachi no Morning Musume	Morning Musume	J-pop	Zetima
7	Digital Native	Yasutaka Nakata	Future bass / EDM	Unborde
7	Aio Piano	Ai Otsuka	J-pop	Avex Trax
14	World Domination	Band-Maid	Hard rock	Crown Stones
14	Watashi Kono Mama de Ii no kana	BoA	J-pop	Avex Trax
14	#5	Ling Tosite Sigure	Post-hardcore / Indie rock	Sony Music Japan
14	Honey	Scandal	Pop rock / Alternative rock	Epic Records Japan
14	XYZ=repainting	Sexy Zone	J-pop	Pony Canyon
14	Riri	Riri	R&B / EDM	Sony Music Associated Records
21	Time	Leo Ieiri	J-pop / Pop rock	Colourful Records
21	I	Juju	J-pop / New wave / Jazz	Sony Music Japan
21	Evolve to Love	Kokia	J-pop / Folk	Victor Entertainment
28	Deen The Best Forever Complete Singles+	Deen	J-pop / Pop rock	Epic Records Japan
28	And	Koda Kumi	J-pop / Urban / R&B	Rhythm Zone
28	BTOB Japan Best Album 2014-2017 ～1096 Days～	BtoB	J-pop	Cube Entertainment Japan
28	Yoru, Carmen no Shishuu	Kiyoharu	Rock	Triad

=== March ===
Date	Album	Artist	Genre	Labels
7	You	Mao Abe	J-pop / Pop rock	Pony Canyon
7	Cocoon	Androp	Alternative rock / Hard rock / Indie rock	Zen Music
7	Best	Daichi Miura	R&B / Dance / J-pop	Sonic Groove
14	Reason of Black Color	Ame no Parade	Indie rock / Alternative rock	Speedstar Records
14	Spotlight	Flower Flower	Rock	Sony Music Japan
14	Flyways	Moumoon	J-pop	Avex Trax
14	Koki Aisare Stance	Sawa	Electropop / Trance / IDM	Spacy Records
14	No.0	Buck-Tick	Indie rock / Alternative rock	Victor Entertainment
14	Some Dreams	Earphones	J-pop	Evil Line Records
21	Sang	Kamijo	Symphonic metal / Power metal	Sherow Artist Society
21	Epcotia	NEWS	J-pop	Johnny's Entertainment
21	True Woman	Nokko	J-pop / House / Bossa nova	Universal Sigma Label
21	Play	Masaki Suda	J-pop	Epic Records Japan
28	Best Hit AKG 2	Asian Kung-Fu Generation	Indie rock / Alternative rock	Ki/oon Music
28	Highway Star	Exile The Second	J-pop / Dance / R&B / Hip hop	Rhythm Zone
28	World Atlas	Fhána	J-pop / Anison	Lantis
28	G.R.N.D.	Garnidelia	Power pop / Power rock / Synth-pop	Sacra Music
28	Koda Kumi Driving Hit's 8	Koda Kumi	Drum and bass / Dubstep / House	Rhythm Zone
28	Beat & Roses	Mitsuhiro Oikawa	J-pop / Kayōkyoku	Victor Entertainment
28	Sakanazukan	Sakanaction	Alternative rock / New wave / Indie rock	NF Records

=== April ===
Date	Album	Artist	Genre	Labels
4	Big Yell	Yuzu	J-pop	Senha & Co.
4	No Time	Jun. K	J-pop	Epic Records Japan
11	UreD	Greeeen	Pop rock	Zen Music
11	Haru to Shura	Haru Nemuri		
11	Yuming kara no, Koi no Uta.	Yumi Matsutoya	J-pop	EMI Records
11	The Empire Strikes Start!!	Empire	J-pop	Avex Trax
18	Revenant	Mary's Blood	Heavy metal	Tokuma Japan Communications
18	Shinee The Best From Now On	Shinee	J-pop	EMI Records
25	Bunriha no Natsu	Nariaki Obukuro	R&B / J-pop / PBR&B	Epic Records Japan
25	Piece	Monsta X	J-pop	Universal Music Japan
25	Otonoe	Wagakki Band	J-pop / Folk / Heavy metal	Avex Trax
25	Magic Hour	Maaya Uchida	J-pop	Pony Canyon

=== May ===
Date	Album	Artist	Genre	Labels
2	Hybrid Funk	Tsuyoshi Domoto	Neo-soul	Johnny's Entertainment
9	Magic	Exo-CBX	J-pop	Avex Trax
23	Chain	NCT 127	J-pop	Avex Trax
23	Kyō Kara Watashitachi wa: GFriend 1st Best	Gfriend	J-pop	King Records

=== June ===
Date	Album	Artist	Genre	Labels
6	Ni no Kuni II: Revenant Kingdom Original Soundtrack	Joe Hisaishi	Soundtrack	Avex Entertainment
6	Battle Against Damnation	Lovebites	Power metal / Thrash metal	Victor Entertainment
6	Chasing the Horizon	Man with a Mission	Rap rock / Electro-rock	Sony Music Records
13	Ninth	The Gazette	Gothic metal / Metalcore / Alternative metal	Sony Music Records
13	Kisses and Kills	The Oral Cigarettes	Alternative rock / Indie rock	A-Sketch
17	Galapagos	Wednesday Campanella	Art pop / Hip house / Tropical house	Warner Music Japan
19	Tomorrow	TVXQ	J-pop / Dance-pop	Avex Trax
20	Hashiridasu Shunkan	Hiragana Keyakizaka46	J-pop / Dance-pop	Sony Music Records
27	Tetsuya Komuro Archives "T"	Various Artists	J-pop	Avex Trax
27	Tetsuya Komuro Archives "K"	Various Artists	J-pop	Avex Trax
27	Hatsukoi	Hikaru Utada	J-pop / Soul / R&B	Epic Records Japan

=== July ===
Date	Album	Artist	Genre	Labels
4	#Cookie Jar	Red Velvet	J-pop	Avex Trax

=== August ===
Date	Album	Artist	Genre	Labels
1	Legend S: Baptism XX	Babymetal	Kawaii metal / J-pop / Heavy metal	Toy's Factory
1	Gracia	Mari Hamada	J-pop / Heavy metal	Victor Entertainment
15	Future Pop	Perfume	J-pop / Electropop / EDM / Future bass	Universal J
22	Sense or Love	Hey! Say! JUMP	J-pop	J Storm
22	DNA	Koda Kumi	J-pop / Urban / R&B / Electropop	Rhythm Zone
29	Shine	Pentagon	J-pop	Cube Entertainment Japan

=== September ===
Date	Album	Artist	Genre	Labels
5	Empire Originals	Empire	J-pop	Avex Trax
12	BDZ	Twice	J-pop / Electropop	Warner Music Japan
22	Last Waltz in Tokyo	World's End Girlfriend	Contemporary classical / Post-rock	Virgin Babylon Records
26	The Insulated World	Dir En Grey	Avant-garde metal / Progressive metal	Fire Wall Div. / SMEJ
26	Japamyu	Kyary Pamyu Pamyu	J-pop / Electropop / EDM / Eurodance / Bubblegum	Unborde
27	2PM Awards Selection	2PM	Pop	Epic Records Japan

=== October ===
Date	Album	Artist	Genre	Labels
3	RUN	Tofubeats	J-pop	Unborde
10	qp	Ichiko Aoba	Contemporary folk	Victor Entertainment
10	Kimi Omou: Shunkashūtō	Mai Kuraki	J-pop / R&B / Dance-pop	Northern Music
17	Jijitsujo	Reol	Electropop / Hip-Hop	Victor Entertainment
17	Unlock	Day6	Pop rock / Ballad	Warner Music Japan

=== November ===
Date	Album	Artist	Genre	Labels
14	Tadashii Itsuwari Kara no Kishō	Zutomayo	J-pop	EMI Records
16	Heir to Despair	Sigh	Avant-garde metal / Progressive metal	Candlelight Records
21	Sleepless in Brooklyn	Alexandros	Rock	Universal J / RX-Records
28	Taemin	Taemin	J-pop	EMI Records / Universal Music

=== December ===
Date	Album	Artist	Genre	Labels
5	Hometown	Asian Kung-Fu Generation	Indie rock / Alternative rock	Ki/oon Records
5	Clockwork Immortality	Lovebites	Power metal / Thrash metal	Victor Entertainment
5	Cheers	Lee Hong-gi	J-pop	Warner Music Japan
5	Music Muscle	Maki Ohguro	J-pop	Being Inc.
21	Hologram	Key	J-pop	EMI Records
26	BDZ - Repackage	Twice	J-pop / Electropop	Warner Music Japan

== Debuting and returning artists ==
=== Debuting groups ===
- April
- Day6
- dps
- Dreamcatcher
- Empire
- EXID
- Fantastics from Exile Tribe
- First Place
- GFriend
- Gugudan
- Hachimitsu Rocket
- King & Prince
- Mamamoo
- Myteen
- Neo Japonism
- Raise A Suilen
- Red Velvet
- Seventeen
- Spira Spica
- STU48
- Uijin
- Yoshimotozaka46
- Zutomayo

=== Debuting soloists ===
- Aina the End
- Shuta Sueyoshi
- Ryuji Imaichi
- Taiki Yamazaki
- Minori Suzuki
- Mai Fuchigami
- Misako Uno
- Ryucheru
- Rika Tachibana
- Kiyoe Yoshioka
- Kaori Ishihara
- Shigeru Joshima
- Haruka Yamazaki
- Yuma Uchida
- Makoto Furukawa
- Ryusei Yokohama
- Yuka Ozaki
- Reona
- Chiaki Satō
- Yuka Ozaki
- Akari Nanawo
- Chiaki Ito
- Meimi Tamura
- Halca
- Taemin
- Key

=== Returning from hiatus ===
- Ayami Mutō
- Eir Aoi
- KAT-TUN
- Ami Wajima
- Ellegarden
- Hilcrhyme
- Ikimonogakari
- Charisma.com

== Disbanding and retiring artists ==
=== Disbanding ===
- Idol Renaissance
- La PomPon
- Mix Speaker's,Inc.
- GEM
- Chelsy
- Cheeky Parade
- Chatmonchy
- Ciao Bella Cinquetti
- Tackey & Tsubasa
- Passpo
- Babyraids Japan
- Vanilla Beans
- X21
- Aqua Timez
- Secret
- Tahiti

=== Retiring ===
- Tetsuya Komuro
- Namie Amuro
- Chiyo Okumura
- Hideaki Takizawa (Tackey & Tsubasa)
- Hitomi Yoshizawa

=== Going on hiatus ===
- Charisma.com
- Folks
- Tsubasa Imai (Tackey & Tsubasa)
- Chris Hart
- Mao Denda
- Jero
- Yumi Hara
- Keito Okamoto (Hey! Say! JUMP)
- Nobuo Uematsu
- Shiori Niiyama
- Rice
- Sads

== Deaths ==
- January 26 – Junji Yayoshi, guitarist and record producer (b. 1968)
- January 31 – Itokin, MC and track maker (b. 1979)
- April 24 – Doji Morita, singer-songwriter (b. 1953)
- April 27 – Yukiji Asaoka, singer and actress (b. 1935)
- May 16 – Hideki Saijo, singer and actor (b. 1955)
- October 12 – Takehisa Kosugi, composer and violinist (b. 1938)
- November 14 – Masahiro Sayama, jazz pianist (b. 1953)
- November 25 – Norio Maeda, jazz pianist, composer, and conductor (b. 1934)

== See also ==
- 2018 in Japan
- 2018 in Japanese television
- List of Japanese films of 2018
