= Hanabi (Ikimonogakari song) =

Single by Ikimonogakari

from the album Sakura Saku Machi Monogatari
- B-side: "Amai Nigai Jikan"; "Momen no Handkerchief"
- Released: May 31, 2006
- Recorded: 2005
- Genre: Pop rock; folk rock
- Label: Epic
- Songwriter: Yoshiki Mizuno
- Producer: Y. Mizuno

Ikimonogakari singles chronology
"Sakura" (2006)	"Hanabi" (2006)	"Koisuru Otome" (2006)

"Hanabi" (stylized in all caps) is a song by Japanese pop music trio Ikimono-gakari for their debut studio album, Sakura Saku Machi Monogatari (2007). It premiered on May 31, 2006, as the second single from the album in Japan. It was written and composed by the group's guitarist Yoshiki Mizuno, whilst arrangement was handled by Ryo Eguchi. The track was used as the seventh ending theme song for the TV Tokyo anime Bleach. This is their first song to be tied to an anime, and is an up-tempo song, the complete opposite of the previous song, "Sakura." The lyrics reflect on past relationships, friendships, and moments, suggesting that these memories, like fireworks, may have faded, but their impact remains.

Met with mostly positive reviews from music critics, the song became a commercial success. It debuted at number five on the Oricon Singles Chart, becoming the group's first top ten single. The song was certified gold by the Recording Industry Association of Japan for shipments and digital sales of 100,000 units, shifting 200,000 units in Japan. An accompanying music video was directed by Takahide Ishii, which is mostly produced using CG animation. In order to promote the single, Ikimonogakari performed it on several nationwide concert tours, and added it to greatest hits albums including Ikimonobakari: Members Best Selection (2010) and Chou Ikimonobakari Tennen Kinen Members Best Selection (2016).

== Background and composition ==
On April 11, 2006, news outlets reported that Ikimonogakari would sing the seventh ending theme song for the highly popular TV Tokyo anime Bleach, which was entitled "Hanabi." It was written and composed by Yoshiki Mizuno, whilst production and arrangement was handled by Ryo Eguchi. The song was recorded by Takayuki Saito and Takayuki Furuta. The final product was mastered by Yuka Koizumi.

Musically, "Hanabi" is an upbeat pop rock and folk rock song. The song's title is the romanized Japanese word for fireworks. The song uses "Hanabi" as a metaphor for the beautiful, yet transient nature of memories and experiences, just like the fleeting beauty of fireworks in the night sky.

== Reception ==
"Hanabi" debuted at number five on the Oricon Singles Chart, with 24,113 copies sold in its first week. The song became their first single/album to enter the top ten. It dropped to number eighteen the next week, selling 12,684 copies. With only nine weeks worth of sales counting toward the tally, "Hanabi" ranked at number 159 on the year-end Oricon Singles Chart for 2006.

== Charts ==
=== Weekly charts ===
Chart (2006)	Peak position
Japan Singles (Oricon)	5

=== Monthly charts ===
Chart (2006)	Peak position
Japan Singles (Oricon)	12

=== Year-end charts ===
Chart (2006)	Position
Japan Singles (Oricon)	159
