= Hotaru no Hikari (disambiguation) =

Hotaru no Hikari is an 1877 Japanese song based on the music of Auld Lang Syne with lyrics by Chikai Inagaki.

Hotaru no Hikari may also refer to:

- Hotaru no Hikari (manga) by Satoru Hiura
- "Hotaru no Hikari (Ikimonogakari song)", a 2009 song by Ikimonogakari
