= List of Oricon number-one albums of 2015 =

The highest-selling albums in Japan are ranked in the weekly Oricon Albums Chart, which is published by Oricon Style magazine. The data is compiled by Oricon based on each albums' weekly physical sales. This list includes the albums that reached the number one place on that chart in 2015.

== Chart history ==
Issue date	Album	Artist(s)	Reference(s)
January 5	Fun! Fun! Fanfare!	Ikimono-gakari	
January 12	E.G.Time	E-girls	
January 19	Tōmei na Iro	Nogizaka46	
January 26	Tree	Sekai no Owari	
February 2	Koko ga Rhodes da, Koko de Tobe!	AKB48	
February 9	Planet Seven	Sandaime J Soul Brothers from Exile Tribe	
February 16	Planet Seven	Sandaime J Soul Brothers from Exile Tribe	
February 23	35xxxv	One Ok Rock	
March 3	Generation Ex	Generations from Exile Tribe	
March 9	White	News	
March 16	Epic Day	B'z	
March 23	Sexy Power 3	Sexy Zone	
March 30	Walk of My Life	Koda Kumi	
April 6	19: Road to Amazing World	Exile	
April 13	Budō	Southern All Stars	
April 20	Tama Riku	Masaharu Fukuyama	
April 27	2PM of 2PM	2PM	
May 4	Paripipo	Johnny's West	
May 11	Journey of a Songwriter: Tabi Suru Songwriter	Shōgo Hamada	
May 18	Journey of a Songwriter: Tabi Suru Songwriter	Shōgo Hamada	
May 25	A.B.Sea Market	A.B.C-Z	
June 1	TU	Tsuyoshi Domoto	
June 8	μ’s Best Album Best Live! Collection II	μ's	
June 15	Reflection	Mr. Children	
June 22	Genic	Namie Amuro	
June 29	No Music No Weapon	Golden Bomber	
July 6	JUMPing CAR	Hey! Say! JUMP	
July 13	Kis-My-World	Kis-My-Ft2	
July 20	Dreams Come True The Best! Watashi no Dorikamu	Dreams Come True	
July 27	Dreams Come True The Best! Watashi no Dorikamu	Dreams Come True	
August 3	Dreams Come True The Best! Watashi no Dorikamu	Dreams Come True	
August 10	Super Very Best	V6	
August 17	Dreams Come True the Best! Watashi no Dorikamu	Dreams Come True	
August 24	Dreams Come True the Best! Watashi no Dorikamu	Dreams Come True	
August 31	Rhinoceros	Porno Graffitti	
September 7	Dreams Come True the Best! Watashi no Dorikamu	Dreams Come True	
September 14	Yasou Emaki	Wagakki Band	
September 21	Ninin Sankyaku 2015.8.15: Midori no hi	Yuzu	
September 28	AAA 10th Anniversary Best	AAA	
October 5	The Visionalux	Exile Takahiro	
October 12	Colors	CNBLUE	
October 19	Bremen	Kenshi Yonezu	
October 26	French Kiss	French Kiss	
November 2	Japonism	Arashi	
November 9	Japonism	Arashi	
November 16	1	The Beatles	
November 23	Kanjani8 no Genki ga Deru CD!!	Kanjani Eight	
November 30	0 to 1 no Aida	AKB48	
December 7	0 to 1 no Aida	AKB48	
December 14	Yellow Dancer	Gen Hoshino	
December 21	Chandelier	Back Number	
December 28	Chandelier	Back Number	

== See also ==
- 2015 in Japanese music
