= Blue Bird (Ikimonogakari song) =

- CD single and digital cover

Single by Ikimonogakari

from the album My Song Your Song
- B-side: "Natsuiro Wakusei"
- Released: July 9, 2008
- Recorded: 2007—2008
- Studio: Sony Music Studios Tokyo
- Genre: Pop rock; folk rock
- Length: 3:39
- Label: Epic Records Japan
- Songwriter: Yoshiki Mizuno
- Producer: Y. Mizuno

Ikimonogakari singles chronology
"Kaeritaku Natta yo" (2008)	"Blue Bird" (2008)	"Planetarium" (2008)

Music video
- "Blue Bird" on YouTube

"Blue Bird" (Japanese: ブルーバード, Hepburn: Burūbādo) is a song recorded by Japanese pop music trio Ikimono-gakari for their third studio album, My Song Your Song (2008). It premiered on July 9, 2008, as the second single from the album in Japan. It was written and composed by the group's guitarist Yoshiki Mizuno, whilst arrangement was handled by Ryo Eguchi. The track was used as the third opening theme for the anime Naruto: Shippuden, and appeared on its compilation album soundtrack respectively. Musically, "Blue Bird" is a fast-paced pop rock and folk rock song. Lyrically, it speaks to the idea of facing challenges and finding strength in overcoming them, mirroring the journey of the characters in Naruto, and uses blue bird as a metaphor.

Upon its release, the track garnered positive reviews from music critics. Many critics highlighted the track as one of Ikimonogakari's best singles, and commended Kiyoe Yoshioka's vocal abilities and the track's lyrics. It was also successful in Japan, peaking within the top five on both the Oricon Singles Chart and the Billboard Japan Hot 100. It was certified five times by the Recording Industry Association of Japan (RIAJ) in different categories, including triple platinum for digital sales, double platinum in chaku-uta (ringtone), gold in physical shipments, and gold in streaming. In order to promote the single, Ikimonogakari performed it on several nationwide concert tours, and added it to greatest hits albums including Ikimonobakari: Members Best Selection (2010) and Chou Ikimonobakari Tennen Kinen Members Best Selection (2016).

== Background and composition ==
"Blue Bird"
A sample of "Blue Bird," a fast-paced, bouncy rock number.

In May 2008, Ikimonogakari announced their new single "Blue Bird" was to be released on July 9 on their official website.

"Blue Bird" was written and composed by Yoshiki Mizuno, whilst production and arrangement was handled by Ryo Eguchi. The strings were arranged by Crusher Kimura. In an interview with Oricon Style, Yoshiki Mizuno said he finished writing the entirety of the song during the summer of 2007. At the time, Mizuno went through a period of writing songs with the goal of increasing the number of up-tempo songs. Then, this time he was approached about writing the opening theme for the TV Tokyo anime Naruto Shippuden, and he thought the melody of "Blue Bird" would be a good fit.

The song was recorded by Toshiro Kai, Hiroki Soshi, Hideyasu Hatagoshi and Tetsuro Fujiwara at Sony Music Studios Tokyo. It was mixed by Toshiro Kai at Sony Music Studios Tokyo and Hitokuchi-zaka Studios, while mastering was done by Mitsuyasu Abe at Sony Music Studios Tokyo.

Musically, "Blue Bird" is a fast-paced "summery" pop rock song with folk rock accents. Throughout the song, a "nostalgic" sounding harmonica can be thoroughly heard. The metaphor in the song's lyrics uses the image of a falling bird to represent someone struggling or losing their way, but ultimately finding the strength to soar again.

== Release and promotion ==
The music video, which takes place on a stage that resemles a bird's cage.

Prior to the CD release, "Blue Bird" was made available for download as a ringtone in April 2008, immediately after the anime began airing. The CD single premiered on July 9, 2008, as the second single from Ikimonogakari's third studio album, My Song Your Song (2008) in Japan, about three months after the previous single "Kaeritaku Natta yo." The CD single also came with the B-side track "Natsuiro Wakusei" as well as the instrumental for the track "Blue Bird." The first press came with "ikimono card 005" as well as a Naruto sticker and card.

The cover artwork for the single was shot by Leslie Kee, with its art direction helmed by Toshiyuki Suzuki and its graphic design done by Ryoko Kawagishi; the single cover depicts the band performing on stage. The song's music video, directed by Hideo Kawatani, was shot at the bowling alley "Toyo Ball Ikegami" (closed in June 2008) in Ota Ward, Tokyo, and features the members singing in a set reminiscent of a birdcage.

"Blue Bird" has since made its appearance on several compilation albums. It has been included on Ikimonobakari: Members Best Selection, and Chō Ikimonobakari: Ten-nen Kinen Members BEST Selection (2016), as well as the theme compilation Best Hit Naruto.

== Reception ==
Upon its release, "Blue Bird" received positive reviews from music critics. A staff member at Amazon.com was positive towards the "nostalgic," "emotional," and "impressive" vibe in the song's lyrics and composition, along with praising the single's B-side "Natsuiro Planet" as a sweet and heartbreaking depiction of summer love. AllMusic's Alexey Eremenko, whom contributed to writing Ikimonogakari's biography on the website, selected "Blue Bird" as some of their best work. A reviewer from CDJournal commented that the song had a dramatic sound that tugs at the heartstrings and praised Yoshioka's "ephemeral" singing. "Blue Bird" is a frequent topic of discussion and appreciation among Naruto fans, with many retrospectively considering it one of the best openings in the series.

Commercially, the single was a success in Japan. "Blue Bird" opened at number three on the Oricon Singles Chart, selling 31,593 units in its first week. It remained on the chart for a total of 27 weeks, and sold 90,267 copies by the time its chart run ended. It sold 87,002 units by the end of 2008, with Oricon ranking it as the 82nd best-selling single of the year. The Recording Industry Association of Japan (RIAJ) certified the CD single gold for exceeding 100,000 sales in Japan. "Blue Bird" received a triple platinum certification for digital sales of 750,000 in September 2015, and a double platinum certification for ringtone sales of 500,000 in July 2014.

== Live performances ==
Ikimonogakari has performed "Blue Bird" in nearly all of their concert tours from summer 2008 onwards, and the live performances were placed the subsequent DVDs chronicling those tours. The first time the band performed the song live was at the music festival Mu~Fes 2008 on July 10, 2008. It was also performed at Ontama Carnival 09 at the Yokohama Arena on January 24, 2009; the version performed at that event was included as a B-side on the single "Futari." In 2009, Masahiko Morino (Chunichi Dragons) and Takero Okajima (Tohoku Rakuten Golden Eagles) used it as their entrance song when coming up to bat in home games, and in 2014, Takuya Shindoh (Yokohama DeNA Baystars) has also been using it as his entrance song when pitching at home games since 2017.

== Track listing ==
CD single

1. "Blue Bird" (ブルーバード) — 3:39
2. "Natsuiro Wakusei" (夏色惑星; Summer-Colored Planet) — 4:13
3. "Blue Bird -instrumental- (ブルーバード; instrumental)" — 3:39

== Personnel ==
Blue Bird

- Kiyoe Yoshioka – Vocals
- Yoshiki Mizuno – Electric Guitar
- Hotaka Yamashita – Acoustic Guitar, Harmonica
- Ritsuro Mitsui ( THE YOUTH ) – Acoustic Guitar &Electric Guitar
- Hiroo Yamaguchi – Electric Bass
- Shunsuke Watanabe – Piano & Organ
- Turkey ( GO!GO!7188 ) – Drums
- Ryo Eguchi – Programming
- Crusher Kimura Strings – Strings

Natsuiro Wakusei

- Taichi Nakamura – Guitars, Programming
- Kaoru Yamauchi – Electric Bass
- Koji Igarashi – Organ
- Kenji Yanagida – Percussion
- Tomoyasu Kawamura – Drums

== Charts ==
=== Weekly charts ===
Chart (2008)	Peak position
Japan Singles (Oricon)	3
Japan Hot 100 (Billboard Japan)	4
Japan Hot Singles Sales (Billboard Japan)	4

=== Monthly charts ===
Chart (2008)	Peak position
Japan Singles (Oricon)	13

=== Year-end charts ===
Chart (2008)	Position
Japan Singles (Oricon)	82
Japan Hot 100 (Billboard Japan)	90

== Certifications ==
Region	Certification	Certified units/sales
Japan (RIAJ) physical sales	Gold	90,267
Japan (RIAJ) digital sales	3× Platinum	750,000^{*}
Japan (RIAJ) digital sales; Chaku-Uta	2× Platinum	500,000^{*}
Streaming
Japan (RIAJ)	Gold	50,000,000^{†}
^{*} Sales figures based on certification alone.^{†} Streaming-only figures based on certification alone.

== Release history ==
Release history for "Blue Bird"
Region	Date	Format	Label
Japan	April 2008	Digital download	Epic
Japan	July 9, 2008	CD single	Epic
Various	December 24, 2008	Digital download; streaming	Epic
