= Sakura (Ikimonogakari song) =

Single by Ikimonogakari

from the album Sakura Saku Machi Monogatari
- B-side: "Hot Milk"
- Released: March 15, 2006
- Recorded: 2005
- Genre: Pop rock; folk rock
- Label: Epic
- Songwriter(s): Yoshiki Mizuno
- Producer(s): Y. Mizuno

Ikimonogakari singles chronology
| "Sakura" (2006) | "Hanabi" (2006) |

"Sakura" (stylized in all caps) is the debut single by Japanese pop music trio Ikimonogakari. It was released by Epic Records Japan on March 15, 2006, as a CD single and digital download. It also serves as the lead single for Ikimonogakari's debut studio album, Sakura Saku Machi Monogatari (2007). It was written and composed by Yoshiki Mizuno, and arranged by Masanori Shimada. "Sakura" is an introspective pop ballad which draws influences from folk rock through its instrumentation of which includes acoustic guitars, drums and strings. The song's lyrics depict two people parting ways after a graduation, also depicting a sad love and nostalgic memories.

"Sakura" was well-received by music critics, who complimented Kiyoe Yoshioka's tormented and emotive vocal performance and the song's overall production value. The single was a commercial success as it became a long-selling hit, staying on the Oricon Singles Chart for 31 weeks, and reached a peak of number 17. It was certified four times by the Recording Industry Association of Japan (RIAJ) in different categories, including triple platinum for digital sales, double platinum in chaku-uta (ringtone), and gold in physical shipments. Ten years after its release, the track attained a new peak on the Billboard Japan Hot 100 of number 41.

An accompanying music video was directed by Tetsuro Takeuchi, and was shot at the east exit of Tomizu Station on the Odakyu Odawara Line. In order to promote the single, it appeared on greatest hits albums, and live concert tours conducted by Ikimonogakari. It was also used as NTT's "DENPO115" East Japan Area 2006 commercial song. To date, the recording remains one of the group's highest-selling singles according to Oricon Style.

== Background and composition ==
"Sakura"
"Sakura" is an acoustic guitar-driven midtempo pop ballad with folk rock influences, featuring Yoshioka delivering a tormented vocal performance.

"Sakura" was written and composed by the group's guitarist Yoshiki Mizuno himself, while arrangement was handled by music producer Masanori Shimada. This song was written when they were having difficulty writing songs for their major debut, with the intention of "keeping everything neutral and writing songs however they wanted." At the time, there were already many songs with sakura in the title, so there were voices against the release, but it was decided to release it as it was, with the reasons being "we love Japanese music, so it would be uncool to not go head-on with the standard of sakura," and "the lyrics of the chorus mean that the title can only be 'SAKURA'." Mizuno and the director had a lot of trouble writing the lyrics, and about 30 versions were rejected before the current lyrics were completed.

"Sakura" is a midtempo pop ballad, with folk rock and soft rock influences. Instrumentation is provided by a piano, acoustic guitars, live drums, and strings. The song is written in the key of F minor with a common time tempo of 150 beats per minute. The lyrics of "Sakura" are about coming-of-age image of accepting memories of the past and moving strongly into the future through the pop and classic Japanese topic of `sakura`. The song's narrator sings about the painful state of being unable to forget her feelings for the other person after their graduation. The "Ohashi" bridge in the song's lyrics represents the Sagami-ohashi Bridge that spans the Sagami River; indicating that the narrator and her partner attended school there.

=== Release and formats ===
"Sakura" was selected as the band's debut single and released on March 15, 2006, by Epic Records Japan in digital and physical formats. The maxi CD of the single contains the original composition and its instrumental version, plus the B-sides "Hot Milk" and "Sotsugyou Shashin," the latter being a cover of the 1975 song by Yumi Matsutoya. The single's artwork was photographed by Muga Miyahara, while Keiichiro Oshima took charge of its art direction; the cover depicts paper cutouts of the band members under a paper cutout of a tree.

== Reception ==
Music critics gave "Sakura" very positive reviews. Japanese magazine CDJournal reviewed the single, as well as its appearances on Sakura Saku Machi Monogatari and Ikimonogakari's greatest hits albums Ikimonobakari: Members Best Selection (2010), Barādon (2012), and Chō Ikimonobakari: Ten-nen Kinen Members BEST Selection (2016). CDJournal called it a "heart-warming" pop song and noted that the song's effective use of strings was impressive. In their Ikimonobakari: Members Best Selection review, the magazine stated that the song had "charming" lyrical lyrics full of seasonal feeling. The magazine lauded Yoshioka's "ephemeral" and "dignified" singing voice in their review of the song on Barādon; they also called the a cappella at the end a "masterpiece."

Commercially, "Sakura" experienced success in Japan. It debuted at number 40 on the Oricon Singles Chart, selling 3,090 copies in its first week of availability. The recording then went to number twenty, selling 5,187 copies on its fourth week. It reached a peak of number 17 on its seventh week with 6,333 copies sold. Overall, it charted for 31 weeks and sold 59,758 copies. Because it sold 49,506 copies in 2006, it was the 182nd best-single of that year. The CD single for "Sakura" was certified gold by the Recording Industry Association of Japan (RIAJ) for shipments of 100,000 units. The single was certified double platinum in May 2011 by the RIAJ for ringtone sales of 500,000 units in Japan. By October 2016, it was certified triple platinum by the RIAJ for full-length downloads of 750,000 units. As of December 2024, "Sakura" marks the band's ninth highest-selling song based on Oricon Style's database.

== Music video and promotion ==
An accompanying music video for the single was directed by Tetsuro Takeuchi. The music video was shot at the east exit of Tomizu Station on the Odakyu Odawara Line, and features Rie Kato, who debuted at the same time as the band and is in the same agency. The video also shows a section of the Odakyu 9000 series train, which was retired around the same time as the release (March 17, 2006). A new music video, "SAKURA -2007version-," was made for the release of their first major album, Sakura Saku Machi Monogatari. The song "Sakura" was used as NTT's "DENPO115" East Japan Area 2006 commercial song. In February 2021, the song was used as the commercial song for McDonald's Japan's Teritama Burger "Sakura Spirit." Since the release of their greatest hits album, Ikimonobakari: Members Best Selection on November 3, 2010, it has been used as the approach melody at Ebina Station on the Odakyu Odawara Line.

"Sakura" has been heavily promoted on compilation albums conducted by Ikimonogakari. It has been included on Ikimonobakari: Members Best Selection, Barādon (2012), and Chō Ikimonobakari: Ten-nen Kinen Members BEST Selection (2016). The single has also been featured on most of the group's concert tours and their supsequent home media releases since their debut in 2006.

== Track listing ==
| No. | Title | Lyrics | Music | Arranger(s) | Length |
|---|---|---|---|---|---|
| 1. | "Sakura" | Yoshiki Mizuno | Y. Mizuno | Masanori Shimada | 5:54 |
| 2. | "Hot Milk" (ホットミルク Hotto Miruku) | Hotaka Yamashita, Y. Mizuno | H. Yamashita | Seiji Kameda | 4:57 |
| 3. | "Sotsugyō Shashin" (卒業写真 "Graduation Photo") | Yumi Arai | Y. Arai | Ryo Eguchi | 4:01 |
| 4. | "Sakura" (Instrumental) | Y. Mizuno | Y. Mizuno | M. Shimada | 5:54 |

== Charts ==
=== Weekly charts ===
| Chart (2006) | Peak position |
|---|---|
| Japan Singles (Oricon) | 17 |

| Chart (2016) | Peak position |
|---|---|
| Billboard Japan Hot 100 | 41 |

=== Year-end charts ===
| Chart (2006) | Position |
|---|---|
| Japan Singles (Oricon) | 182 |

== Certifications ==
| Region | Certification | Certified units/sales |
|---|---|---|
| Japan (RIAJ) Physical | Gold | 59,758 |
| Japan (RIAJ) Digital | 3× Platinum | 750,000^{*} |
| Japan (RIAJ) Ringtone | 2× Platinum | 500,000^{*} |
| Japan (RIAJ) PC Downloads | Gold | 100,000^{*} |
^{*} Sales figures based on certification alone.
