= Tokyo (Juju song) =

Single by Juju

from the album I
- Released: January 24, 2018
- Genre: Pop
- Length: 5:44
- Label: Onenation
- Songwriters: R-Y's; Tomoko
- Producer: Koichi Tsutaya

Juju singles chronology
"Iiwake" (2017)	"Tokyo" (2018)

Audio sample
- "Tokyo": file; help

"Tokyo" (東京(とうきょう)) is a song recorded by Japanese singer Juju, from her seventh studio album I. It was released as the album's fifth single by Onenation on January 24, 2018. The song was co-written by Yū Arakaki and Masaki Yasujima of the music duo Akidasu, credited as R-Y's, and Tomoko, and composed by the former. The track was arranged and produced by Koichi Tsutaya. "Tokyo" is the theme song to the film Inori no Maku ga Oriru Toki (2018), the last chapter of the Shinzanmono series starring Hiroshi Abe, based on the novel of the same name by Keigo Higashino. The first pressing of the CD single comes with a DVD including a selection of live performances from Juju's Juju Hall Tour 2016 What You Want concert tour.

== Background ==
"Tokyo" was released merely three months following Juju's previous single, "Iiwake". The song's music video features actress Moeka Hoshi and was directed by Kentarō Hagiwara of Tokyo Ghoul fame. Koichi Tsutaya, who produced the song, stated about working with Juju that she stands out in the current Japanese music scene by being one of the few singers to put out varied quality adult contemporary music.

== Chart performance ==
"Tokyo" debuted at number 17 on the Oricon Singles Chart, with 4,000 copies sold in its first week. The song also charted on the Oricon Digital Singles Chart, debuting at number 4 and selling 18,000 downloads. "Tokyo" peaked at number 6 on Billboard Japan's Hot 100 chart.

== Track listing ==
No.	Title	Writer(s)	Arranger(s)	Length
1.	"Tokyo" (東京)	R-Y's; Tomoko	Koichi Tsutaya	5:44
2.	"Urahara" (ウラハラ, "Reverse")	Juju; Her0ism; Tido Nguyen; Ale Albert	Her0ism; Nguyen	3:31
3.	"Ai" (藍, "Indigo")	Takuya Ōhashi; Shintarō Tokita	Masato Ishinami	4:36
4.	"Tokyo" (Instrumental)	R-Y's	Koichi Tsutaya	5:42
Total length:				19:34

Juju Hall Tour 2016 What You Want: 4th Selection DVD
No.	Title	Length
1.	"With You" (Tour 2016 Version)
2.	"Eternally" (Tour 2016 Version)
3.	"Kiseki o Nozomu Nara..." (Tour 2016 Version)
4.	"Arigatō" (Tour 2016 Version)

== Charts ==
Chart (2018)	Peak position
Japan Weekly Singles (Oricon)	17
Japan Weekly Digital Singles (Oricon)	4
Japan Hot 100 (Billboard)	6
Japan Download Songs (Billboard)	4
Japan Streaming Songs (Billboard)	5
Japan Top Singles Sales (Billboard)	19

== Sales ==
Region	Certification	Certified units/sales
Japan	—	69,000
