= I (Juju album) =

Studio album by Juju
- Released: February 21, 2018
- Genre: Pop; jazz; R&B
- Length: 59:35
- Label: Onenation
- Producer: her0ism; Seiji Kameda; Takeshi Kobayashi; Kiyoshi "KC" Matsuo; Tido Nguyen; Kazumasa Oda; Pius; Mats Lie Skåre; Kenji Tamai; Kōichi Tsutaya; Uta

Juju chronology
Snack Juju: Yoru no Request (2016)	I (2018)

Singles from I
- 1. "Believe Believe" Released: November 30, 2016; 2. "Because of You" Released: March 22, 2017; 3. "Iiwake" Released: October 11, 2017; 4. "Tokyo" Released: January 24, 2018

I is the seventh studio album by Japanese singer Juju. It was released on February 21, 2018, through Onenation. "I" became Juju's first solo number-one album on the Oricon Albums Chart.

== Background ==
I is Juju's first album in nearly a year and a half, since Snack Juju: Yoru no Request, and first studio album in over two years, since What You Want. The first pressing of the album includes a DVD featuring eight performances from Juju's Juju-en Special: Snack Juju Arena Tour 2017 concert held at Yokohama Arena on July 11, 2017. On November 6, 2017, Juju announced she will be embarking on the Juju Hall Tour 2018 "I" in support of the album. The tour is set to commence on April 22, 2018 at the Mori no Hall 21 in Matsudo, Chiba.

== Commercial performance ==
I entered the daily Oricon Albums Chart at the number-one spot, selling 12,000 units sold. It debuted at the top of the weekly chart as well, logging sales of 29,000 copies. The album also debuted at number one on the Billboard Japan Top Albums Sales chart, and at number 2 on the Billboard Japan Hot Albums chart, where it missed out on the top spot to The Greatest Showman: Original Motion Picture Soundtrack.

== Track listing ==
No.	Title	Writer(s)	Arranger(s)	Length
1.	"Love Is Like"	Kiyoshi Matsuo; Sonomi Tameoka	Jun Abe	5:20
2.	"Iiwake"	Masami Kakinuma; Ryōta Nakano	Takeshi Kobayashi	4:50
3.	"Kawaisou da yo ne" (with Hitsuji) (かわいそうだよね, "Pitiful, Aren't I?")	Ken Hirai	Seiji Kameda	4:52
4.	"Tokyo"	R-Y's; Tomoko	Kōichi Tsutaya	5:43
5.	"Ano Yoru no Futari" (あの夜のふたり, "The Two of Us That Night")	Gorō Matsui; Daisuke Mori	Mori	5:19
6.	"Risky"	Shōko Fujibayashi; Mats Lie Skåre; Shikata; Maria Marcus	Skåre	4:11
7.	"Let It Flow"	H.U.B.; Hiro; Dirty Orange; Mitsu.J	Dirty Orange	4:11
8.	"Because of You"	E-3; Fast Lane; Erik Lidbom; Pius	Pius	4:44
9.	"Roll the Dice"	Akira; Uta; Tameoka	Uta	3:54
10.	"Urahara" (ウラハラ, "Reverse")	Juju; her0ism; Tido Nguyen; Ale Arberti	her0ism; Nguyen	3:31
11.	"Believe Believe"	Kenji Tamai; tzk; Masahiro Tobinai	Tamai; Tobinai	3:52
12.	"Anata ga Kureta Mono" (あなたがくれたもの, "What You Gave Me")	Juju; E-3; Kazumasa Oda	Oda	4:14
13.	"I"	Emi Tawata; Juri Shōno; Hiroshi Suenami; Haru.Robinson	Kameda	4:54
Total length:				59:35

Limited edition DVD: Juju-en Special: Snack Juju Arena Tour 2017 Tokubetsu Encore Demise at Yokohama Arena
No.	Title	Length
1.	"Ah Mujō" / "Roppongi Shinjū" (Snack Juju Arena Tour 2017 Version)
2.	"Kazari Janai no yo Namida wa" (Snack Juju Arena Tour 2017 Version)
3.	"Futari de Osake o" (Snack Juju Arena Tour 2017 Version)
4.	"Manatsu no Yoru no Yume" (Snack Juju Arena Tour 2017 Version)
5.	"Goodbye Day" (Snack Juju Arena Tour 2017 Version)
6.	"Eki" (Snack Juju Arena Tour 2017 Version)
7.	"Koi ni Ochite (Fall in Love)" (Snack Juju Arena Tour 2017 Version)
8.	"Desire (Jōnetsu)" (Snack Juju Arena Tour 2017 Version)

== Charts ==
Chart (2018)	Peak position
Japan Weekly Albums (Oricon)	1
Japan Weekly Digital Albums (Oricon)	2
Japan Hot Albums (Billboard)	2
Japan Download Albums (Billboard)	2
Japan Top Albums Sales (Billboard)	1

== Sales ==
Region	Certification	Certified units/sales
Japan	—	80,236
