= My Song Your Song =

My song Your song

Studio album by Ikimono-gakari
- Released: December 24, 2008 (Japan)
- Genre: Pop, rock
- Length: 67:15
- Label: EPIC Records Japan

Ikimono-gakari chronology
Life Album (2008)	My song Your song (2008)	Hajimari no Uta (2009)

Singles from My Song Your Song
- 1. "Kaeritaku Natta yo" Released: April 16, 2008; 2. "Blue Bird" Released: July 9, 2008; 3. "Planetarium" Released: October 15, 2008; 4. "Kimagure Romantic" Released: December 3, 2008

My Song Your Song is the third studio album by Ikimono-gakari, released on December 24, 2008. The song, "Blue Bird", was known for the third opening sequence in Naruto: Shippuden.

== Track listing ==
No.	Title	Lyrics	Music	Arranger(s)	Length
1.	"Planetarium"	Yoshiki Mizuno	Y. Mizuno	Yusuke Tanaka, Atsushi Yuasa, Strings arranged by: Mio Okamura	5:55
2.	"Kimagure Romantic"	Y. Mizuno	Y. Mizuno	Ryo Eguchi, Strings arranged by: Crusher Kimura	4:03
3.	"Blue Bird"	Y. Mizuno	Y. Mizuno	R. Eguchi, Strings arranged by: Crusher Kimura	3:36
4.	"Spice Magic"	Hotaka Yamashita	H. Yamashita	Susumu Nishikawa	4:45
5.	"Kagebōshi"	H. Yamashita	H. Yamashita	Atsushi Yuasa, Yusuke Tanaka	4:46
6.	"Kaeritaku Natta yo"	Y. Mizuno	Y. Mizuno	Masanori Shimada	6:06
7.	"message"	H. Yamashita	H. Yamashita	Taichi Nakamura	4:20
8.	"Happy Smile Again"	Y. Mizuno	Y. Mizuno	Hiroaki Sugawara	4:28
9.	"Kuchizuke"	H. Yamashita	H. Yamashita	S. Nishikawa	4:21
10.	"Boku wa Koko ni Iru"	Kiyoe Yoshioka	K. Yoshioka	Zentaro Watanabe	5:03
11.	"Boogie Wooogie"	Y. Mizuno	Y. Mizuno	Z. Watanabe	4:32
12.	"Maboroshi"	H. Yamashita	H. Yamashita	Shintaro Tokita (Sukima Switch)	5:53
13.	"Kokoro no Hana o Sakaseyō"	H. Yamashita	H. Yamashita	M. Shimada	4:43
14.	"Kaeritaku Natta yo -acoustic version-"	Y. Mizuno	Y. Mizuno	T. Nakamura	4:14

== Oricon Chart (Japan) ==
Release	Albums chart	Peak position	Debut sales (copies)	Sales total (copies)
December 24, 2008	Daily Chart	1		466,120
December 24, 2008	Weekly Chart	1	242,691	466,120
December 24, 2008	Monthly Chart	1		466,120
December 24, 2008	Yearly Chart (2009)	14	434,743	466,120
