= Newtral =

Studio album by Ikimono-gakari
- Released: February 29, 2012
- Genre: Pop, rock
- Label: EPIC Records Japan

Ikimono-gakari chronology
Ikimonobakari: Members Best Selection (2010)	Newtral (2012)	Barādon (2012)

Singles from Newtral
- 1. "Warattetainda / New World Music" Released: July 20, 2011; 2. "Aruite Ikou" Released: November 23, 2011; 3. "Itsudatte Bokura wa" Released: January 18, 2012

Newtral is the fifth studio album by Ikimono-gakari, released in Japan on February 29, 2012. It has reached number one on the Oricon Weekly charts, and became the group's fourth consecutive number-one album.

== Release ==
The album was released in Japan on February 29, 2012 in two editions. The regular edition (ESCL-3829), had for its first pressings an Ikimono card #028 and an entry form for additional prizes. The limited edition (ESCL-3827/8) included a second CD with live performances from 2009-2011, a set of album themed postcards titled Newseum ?, and special box packaging to display pictures of the three members.

The release day was coincident with vocalist Kiyoe Yoshioka's leap day (February 29) birthday. To celebrate the event, the group held a free event at Roppongi Hills Arena, and it was also streamed live on Nico Nico Douga.

== Tie-ins ==
Tie-ins to media and commercial products.

- "Aruite Ikou" was the theme song of a TBS Drama "ランナウェイ〜愛する君のために" (Runaway - For You, the Person Who I Love) that aired in October–December 2011.
- "Warattetainda" was used as a commercial song for the Nissan Serena in the second half of 2011.
- "Itsudatte Bokura Wa" was used as a commercial song for You Can in January 2012.
- "Kiss Kiss Bang Bang" was a commercial song for Sixteen Tea in February 2012.
- "New World Music" was used in the TV news show "Mezamashi TV" in April 2011.

== Track list ==
Source for romanized title tracks: Jpopasia.com Source for track information: Ikimonogakari official site English translations are unofficial.

No.	Title	Lyrics	Music	Arranger(s)	Length
1.	"Aruite Ikou" (歩いていこう / "let's take a walk")	Yoshiki Mizuno	Y. Mizuno	Akimitsu Honma	6:05
2.	"Warattetainda" (笑ってたいんだ / "I want to laugh")	Y. Mizuno	Y. Mizuno	Seiji Kameda	6:10
3.	"Itsudatte Bokura wa" (いつだって僕らは / "we always")	Hotaka Yamashita	H. Yamashita	Yuusuke Tanaka, Takashi Kondō, Strings arranged by: Mio Okamura	4:24
4.	"Kiss Kiss Bang Bang"	Y. Mizuno	Y. Mizuno	Daichi Hideyuki Suzuki	4:36
5.	"Ai ni Iku yo" (会いにいくよ / "I'm going to meet up with you")	Y. Mizuno	Y. Mizuno	S. Kameda	5:48
6.	"Hoshi" (地球 / "star")	H. Yamashita	H. Yamashita	A. Honma	5:53
7.	"Sentimental Boyfriend" (センチメンタル・ボーイフレンド)	Y. Mizuno	Y. Mizuno	A. Honma	5:52
8.	"Shiroi Diary" (白いダイアリー / "white diary")	Kiyoe Yoshioka	K. Yoshioka	Susumu Nishikawa Strings arranged by: eji	5:06
9.	"Renshi" (恋詩 / "love poem")	H. Yamashita	H. Yamashita	Kōichi Tsutaya	4:42
10.	"New World Music"	Y. Mizuno	Y. Mizuno	K. Tsutaya	4:32
11.	"Ai Kotoba" (愛言葉 / "words of love")	H. Yamashita	H. Yamashita	Masanori Shimada	6:35
12.	"Oyasumi" (おやすみ / "goodnight")	Y. Mizuno	Y. Mizuno	M. Shimada	4:23

* The song is read as "Hoshi" meaning "Star" but uses the kanji 地球 "Chikyuu" meaning "The Earth".

== Release history ==
Country	Date	Format	Label
Japan	February 29, 2012	digital download	Epic Records Japan
Japan	February 29, 2012	CD (ESCL-3829), 2CD limited edition (ESCL-3827/8)	Epic Records Japan
Taiwan	March 2, 2012	2CD limited edition (88691951482)	Sony Music Entertainment Taiwan

== Oricon Chart (Japan) ==
Release	Albums Chart	Peak position	Sales (copies)	Chart run
February 29, 2012	Weekly Chart	1	192,877	2 weeks at number one; ?? weeks total
February 29, 2012	Monthly Chart	2	192,877 (February); 172,095 (March)	
February 29, 2012	End-of-year Chart	12	414,490	N/A
