= Life Album =

Life Album ライフアルバム

Studio album by Ikimono-gakari
- Released: February 13, 2008 (Japan)
- Genre: Pop, rock
- Length: 64:54
- Label: EPIC Records Japan

Ikimono-gakari chronology
| Sakura Saku Machi Monogatari (2007) | Life Album ライフアルバム (2008) | My Song Your Song (2008) |

Singles from Life Album
- 1. "Natsuzora Graffiti / Seishun Line" Released: August 8, 2007; 2. "Akaneiro no Yakusoku" Released: October 24, 2007; 3. "Hana wa Sakura Kimi wa Utsukushi" Released: January 30, 2008

Professional ratings
Review scores
| Source | Rating |
|---|---|
| AllMusic | 3.5/5 stars |

Life Album is Ikimono-gakari's second studio album. It was released in Japan on February 13, 2008.

== Track listing ==
| No. | Title | Lyrics | Music | Arranger(s) | Length |
|---|---|---|---|---|---|
| 1. | "Good Morning" | Yoshiki Mizuno | Y. Mizuno | Masanori Shimada | 5:11 |
| 2. | "Akaneiro no Yakusoku" | Y. Mizuno | Y. Mizuno | M. Shimada | 4:52 |
| 3. | "Natsuzora Graffiti" | Y. Mizuno | Y. Mizuno | Ryo Eguchi | 4:18 |
| 4. | "Seishun Line" | Y. Mizuno | Y. Mizuno | R. Eguchi | 3:55 |
| 5. | "@miso soup" | Hotaka Yamashita | H. Yamashita | Taichi Nakamura | 4:20 |
| 6. | "Soprano" | H. Yamashita | H. Yamashita | M. Shimada | 5:52 |
| 7. | "Hana wa Sakura Kimi wa Utsukushi" | Y. Mizuno | Y. Mizuno | Zentaro Watanabe | 4:24 |
| 8. | "Chikoku Shichau yo" | H. Yamashita, Kiyoe Yoshioka | H. Yamashita | Susumu Nishikawa | 4:13 |
| 9. | "Kokoro Hitotsu Aru ga Mama" | H. Yamashita | H. Yamashita | mugen | 5:19 |
| 10. | "Nisemono" | H. Yamashita | H. Yamashita | S. Nishikawa | 5:39 |
| 11. | "Tokyo Saru Monogatari" | Y. Mizuno | Y. Mizuno | T. Nakamura | 5:22 |
| 12. | "Tsuki to Atashi to Reizōko" | H. Yamashita, K. Yoshioka | H. Yamashita | Ikimonogakari, R. Eguchi | 5:50 |
| 13. | "Akaneiro no Yakusoku -acoustic version-" | Y. Mizuno | Y. Mizuno | T. Nakamura | 5:16 |
