= Tetsuya Komuro Archives =

Box set releases

Tetsuya Komuro Archives refers to two separate box set releases featuring songs from various artists that were produced by the retired Japanese musician Komuro Tetsuya. They were released on June 27, 2018, by the Japanese record label Avex Trax. The box sets were released as Tetsuya Komuro Archives "T" and Tetsuya Komuro Archives "K", with each box set containing fifty songs divided into four separate discs.

Another box set containing both releases titled "Tetsuya Komuro Archives Box" was released by Sony Music Japan on the same day. It contained a bonus disc.

== Tetsuya Komuro Archives "T" ==
TETSUYA KOMURO ARCHIVES "T"

Box set by Various Artists
- Released: June 27, 2018
- Recorded: 1980–2016
- Genre: J-pop
- Label: Avex Trax; AVCD-93892/5
- Producer: Komuro Tetsuya

Various Artists chronology
Jobs, No. 1 (2017)	TETSUYA KOMURO ARCHIVES "T" (2018)

Tetsuya Komuro Archives "T" is the first of the two box sets of songs by various artists that were produced by the retired Japanese musician Komuro Tetsuya. It was released alongside its companion box set Tetsuya Komuro Archives "K" on June 27, 2018, by Avex Trax. The box set debuted at the third spot of the Oricon Weekly Charts with 34,305 copies sold on its first week of release.

=== Track list ===
Disc 1

1. Miss Orange Shock – Itoshino Rina
2. Speedway – Oh! Mistake
3. Yukiko Okada – Sweet Planet
4. Watanabe Misato – My Revolution
5. Watanabe Misato – Teenage Walk
6. Nakayama Miho – JINGI Aishite Moraimasu
7. Hori Chiemi – Ai wo Ima Shinjite Itai
8. TM Network – Get Wild
9. Matsuda Seiko – Kimono Beat
10. Nakayama Miho – 50/50
11. Watanabe Misato – Kanashii ne
12. TM Network – BEYOND THE TIME (Mebiusu no Uchū (sora) o Koete)
13. Koizumi Kyoko – Good Morning-Call

Disc 2

1. Amuro Namie – Body Feels Exit
2. Sakamoto Ryuichi + Tetsuya Komuro – VOLTEX OF LOVE
3. Globe – DEPARTURES (RADIO EDIT)
4. Kahara Tomomi – I'm Proud (Radio Edit)
5. Amuro Namie – Don't wanna cry
6. Dos – Baby baby baby
7. H Jungle With T – FRIENDSHIP
8. Hitomi – In the future
9. Kahara Tomomi – LOVE BRACE
10. Hitomi 「by myself (STRAIGHT RUN)」
11. Oga Tadashi – Close to the night
12. Globe – Can't Stop Fallin' in Love (STRAIGHT RUN)
13. Tsukubo Tsuburaya – Mystery of Sound (Original Mix)

Disc 3

1. TK PRESENTS Konetto – YOU ARE THE ONE
2. Amuro Namie – Can You Celebrate?
3. Taeco – deep GRIND (STRAIGHT RUN)
4. Komuro Tetsuya – SPEED TK RE-MIX
5. Suzuki Ami – love the island
6. Tohko – Fuwafuwa no Kawa
7. Mirai Rei – Umi to Anata no Monogatari
8. TRUE KISS DESTiNATiON – Girls, be ambitious! (Straight Run)
9. AN-J – Egao ga Mieru basho (I Wanna Go)
10. Suzuki Ami – Be Together (Original Mix)
11. BALANCe – GET INTO YOU SUDDENLY
12. Hamasaki Ayumi + KEIKO – A Song Was Born

Disc 4

1. a-nation's party – THX A LOT (Album Version)
2. AAA – Charge & Go!
3. TM Network – I am
4. Hamasaki Ayumi – You & Me
5. SUPER GiRLS – Celebration (Music Ribbon ver.)
6. Komuro Tetsuya – The Generation feat. Zeebra, DABO, SIMON
7. Komuro Tetsuya vs. Hyadain – 22 Seiki-e no Kakehashi
8. Komuro Tetsuya – EDM TOKYO 2014 feat. KOJI TAMAKI
9. DiVA – DISCOVERY
10. tofubeats – Throw your laptop on the fire (feat. Komuro Tetsuya)
11. Komuro Tetsuya feat. Kanda Sayaka (TRUSTRICK) & tofubeats – Hashtag RUN
12. Dream 5 – Futuristic

=== Charts and sales ===
Chart (2018)	Peak position	Sales
Oricon Weekly Albums Chart	3	41,813+

== Tetsuya Komuro Archives "K" ==
TETSUYA KOMURO ARCHIVES "K"

Box set by Various Artists
- Released: June 27, 2018
- Recorded: 1988–2018
- Genre: J-pop
- Label: Avex Trax; AVCD-93896/9
- Producer: Komuro Tetsuya

Various Artists chronology
Jobs, No. 1 (2017)	TETSUYA KOMURO ARCHIVES "K" (2018)

Tetsuya Komuro Archives "K" is the second of the two box sets of songs by various artists that were produced by the retired Japanese musician Komuro Tetsuya. It was released alongside its companion box set Tetsuya Komuro Archives "T" on June 27, 2018, by Avex Trax. The box set debuted at the fourth spot of the Oricon Weekly Charts with 33,530 copies sold on its first week of release.

=== Track list ===
Disc 1

1. TM Network – Seven Days War
2. Rie Miyazawa – Dream Rush
3. Tetsuya Komuro – RUNNING TO HORIZON
4. Minako Tanaka – Yume Mite Try
5. Hiromi Go – Sora wo Toberu Kodomotachi
6. Tetsuya Komuro – Eien to Nadzukete Daydream
7. Alisa Mizuki – Too Shy Shy Boy!
8. TRF – EZ DO DANCE (7" MIX)
9. Makise Riho Kokkyō ni Chikai Ai no Uta
10. Akina Nakamori – Aibu
11. TRF – Survival Dance: No No Cry More (original single chart mix)」
12. TRF – BOY MEETS GIRL (RADIO ON AIR MIX)
13. Ryoko Shinohara with T. Komuro – Itoshisa to Setsunasa to Kokoro Tsuyosa to

Disc 2

1. Ryoko Shinohara with T. Komuro – Motto Motto...
2. TRF – Overnight Sensation: Jidai wa Anata ni Yudaneteru (Original Mix)
3. H Jungle With t – WOW WAR TONIGHT: Tokini wa Okoseyo Movement (2 Million Mix)
4. Hitomi – Candy Girl (Original Mix)
5. Yuki Uchida – Only You (Original Mix)
6. Geisha Girls – Honō no Meeting
7. Midori Rei – Koi o Suru Tabi ni Kizutsuki Yasuku...
8. H Jungle With t – GOING GOING HOME (Original Mix)
9. Hitomi – GO TO THE TOP (ORIGINAL MIX)
10. Ryoko Shinohara – Lady Generation (Original Mix)
11. Globe – Feel Like dance (ORIGINAL MIX)
12. H.A.N.D. – Prime High
13. Tomomi Kahara – I Believe (Radio Edit)

Disc 3

1. Kumi Koda and BoA – The Meaning of Peace
2. Tomiko Van – Again
3. Kaori Mochida In Case of Me
4. Halna – DO OVER AGAIN
5. Globe – Many Classic Moments (Original Mix)
6. Gaball – Shiawase no Hyōgen (featuring Joanne)
7. AAA – Aitai Riyū
8. Mori Shinichi – Nemuranai Love Song
9. Choshinsei – Evidence of Luv
10. Kitano Kii – Hanataba
11. Hamasaki Ayumi – Crossroad
12. Komuro Tetsuya – Vienna (feat. Miu Sakamoto & KREVA)

Disc 4

1. X21 – Yakusoku no Oka
2. Komuro Tetsuya + Tsunku feat. May J. – Have Dreams!
3. BiSH – Earth
4. Def Will – Lovely Day
5. Ōmori Yasuko – Positive Stress
6. AOA – WOW WAR TONIGHT: Tokini wa Okoseyo Movement (girls ver.)
7. Hikakin & Seikin – YouTube Theme Song (Tetsuya Komuro Rearrange)
8. TRIGGER – DAYBREAK INTERLUDE
9. PANDORA feat. Beverly – Be The One
10. LaLuce – Kazeyofuke!
11. Umeda Ayaka – My History
12. Tetsuya Komuro feat. Beverly – Guardian

=== Charts and sales ===
Chart (2018)	Peak position	Sales
Oricon Weekly Albums Chart	4	40,730+

== Tetsuya Komuro Archives Box ==
Sony Music Japan has re-released the two box sets from Avex Trax under the title Tetsuya Komuro Archives Box on the same day of the box sets' release, June 27, 2018, and it featured a bonus disc featuring fourteen additional songs released between 1989 and 1997 (product code DQCL-3458).

=== Track list ===
1. TM Network – Get Wild '89
2. Watanabe Misato – Moonlight Dance
3. Miyazawa Rie – No Titlist
4. Tokyo Performance Doll – Kisu wa Shōnen o Rōhi Suru
5. TMN – Love Train
6. Watanabe Misato – BELIEVE
7. Utsunomiya Takashi – Discovery (Original Mix)
8. Komuro Tetsuya – 50/50
9. Kai Yoshihiro – Against the Wind
10. TRUE KiSS DESTiNATiON – AFRiCA (Original)
11. TM Network – Self Control
12. Suzuki Ami – Alone in My Room
13. Hakuryū – Take a Deep breath
