= Riri (Japanese singer) =

Japanese singer-songwriter (born 1999)

Riri Arai 荒井梨里
- Also known as: Riri
- Born: November 5, 1999 (age 26)
- Origin: Gunma, Japan
- Genres: R&B; electronic; pop
- Years active: 2004–present
- Labels: The Mic-a-holics Inc.; Sony Music Associated
- Website: www.riritone.com

Riri Arai (荒井梨里, Arai Riri; born November 5, 1999), known mononymously as Riri (stylized as RIRI or RiRi), is a Japanese singer-songwriter. After winning a talent contest and being scouted by The Mic-a-holics, the agency that represents Japanese-American singer-songwriter Ai, she released her debut extended play I Love to Sing in 2016. Her second EP Rush was released in 2017, debuting and peaking at number 70 on the Billboard Japan Hot Albums Chart. Shortly after, Sony Music Entertainment Japan offered Riri a record contract and she soon was signed to Sony Music Associated Records. Her eponymous major label debut studio album was released in 2018, followed by her second studio album Neo later that year. Riri's fourth EP, the Summertime EP was released in May 2019, serving as her final release under Sony Music Japan.

== Early life and career ==
Riri started singing at 4 years old, inspired by American R&B acts such as Mariah Carey, Beyoncé and Whitney Houston. In 2011, she won the Next Generation Star singing competition hosted by David Foster. In 2012 she attended The Dream Support Project Award in New York City, making it her first performance in the US. In July 2016, she debuted officially as a singer under The Mic-a-holics Inc., which also manages singer-songwriter Ai, who produced her first official single, "Gold" and her debut extended play, I Love to Sing. In 2017, her second EP Rush was released.

In 2018, Riri signed with Sony Music Japan sublabel Sony Music Associated Records and released her eponymous major label debut studio album. The album was produced by American producers Brian Soko and Damon Sharpe, who also worked with Ariana Grande and Beyoncé. On November 28, 2018, RIRI released her second studio album Neo. It includes the single "Maybe One Day" and a Japanese cover of Zedd's song "Stay". A collaboration song with Japanese R&B singer Shimizu Shota and American rapper Saweetie are included on the album as well.

On May 22, 2019, Riri released the Summertime EP which includes the singles, "Summertime" a collaboration with Japanese rappers Keiju and Nariaki Obukuro, "Luv Luv" which features South Korean rapper Junoflo and a cover of "Dilemma" with Japanese rapper JP the Wavy. She also recorded a Japanese version of "Circle of Life" for the local release of The Lion King. She was featured in the Japanese dub of Cats as the voice of Bombalurina.

By the end of 2019, Riri's contract with Sony Music expired, leading to her independently releasing the single "Episode 0" in 2020.

On April 7, 2021, Riri released a single titled "Wheel of Fortune", which was composed by her and Uta. On May 26, an English version of the song was released with its own music video. In July 2021, Riri announced her next single, "Luv Déjà vu". It was released on July 21 together with Japanese version of the song.

On February 11, 2023, Riri announced a new single, "I Need U”.

== Discography ==
=== Albums ===
==== Studio albums ====
List of studio albums, with selected chart positions
Title	Album details	Peak positions		Sales
Title	Album details	JPN	JPN Hot	Sales
Riri	Released: February 14, 2018; Label: Sony Music Associated; Formats: CD, digital download, streaming	34	18	JPN: 5,484
Neo	Released: November 28, 2018; Label: Sony Music Associated; Formats: CD, digital download, streaming	38	16	

==== Extended plays ====
List of extended plays, with selected chart positions
Title	Album details	Peak positions	
Title	Album details	JPN	JPN Hot
I Love to Sing	Released: November 2, 2016; Label: The Mic-a-holics Inc.; Formats: CD, digital download, streaming	—	—
Rush	Released: June 21, 2017; Label: The Mic-a-holics Inc.; Formats: CD, digital download, streaming	—	70
Riri Premium Studio Session	Released: August 9, 2018; Label: Sony Music Associated Records; Formats: Digital download, streaming	—	—
Summertime EP	Released: May 22, 2019; Label: Sony Music Associated Records; Formats: CD, digital download, streaming	100	—
"—" denotes items that did not chart.

=== Singles ===
==== As lead artist ====
List of singles, showing selected chart positions and associated albums
Title	Year	Peak chart positions	Album
Title	Year	JPN Hot	Album
"Color Me"	2016	—	I Love to Sing
"Gold"	2016	—	I Love to Sing
"Yes Be Free"	2016	—	I Love to Sing
"Stay" (with Zedd)	2018	—	Neo
"Maybe One Day"	2018	—	Neo
"Luv Luv" (featuring Junoflo)	2019	— (Note: "Luv Luv" did not enter the Billboard Japan Hot 100, but peaked at number 94 on the Billboard Japan Download Songs chart.)	Summertime EP
"Summertime" (with Keiju and Nariaki Obukuro)	2019	— (Note: "Summertime" did not enter the Billboard Japan Hot 100, but peaked at number 98 on the Billboard Japan Download Songs chart.)	Summertime EP
"Dilemma" (with JP the Wavy)	2019	94	Summertime EP
"Circle of Life"	2019	—	The Lion King
"Episode 0"	2020	—	TBA
"Wheel of Fortune"	2021	—	TBA
"Luv Déjà vu"	2021	—	TBA
"—" denotes items that did not chart.

==== As featured artist ====
List of singles as a featured artist
Title	Year	Album
"Sky's the Limit" (DJ Ryow featuring Riri, Salu and Socks)	2018	Dreams and Nightmares

==== Promotional singles ====
List of promotional singles, showing selected chart positions and associated albums
Title	Year	Peak chart positions	Album
Title	Year	JPN Hot	Album
"Rush"	2017	97	Rush
"It Feels"	2017	—	Rush
"Keep Up"	2017	—	Riri
"Crush on You"	2018	—	Riri
"That's My Baby"	2018	55	Riri
"Honey"	2018	—	Neo
"Patience" (featuring Saweetie)	2018	—	Neo
"Forever" (featuring Shota Shimizu)	2018	—	Neo
"—" denotes items that did not chart.
