= Babyraids Japan =

Japanese idol group

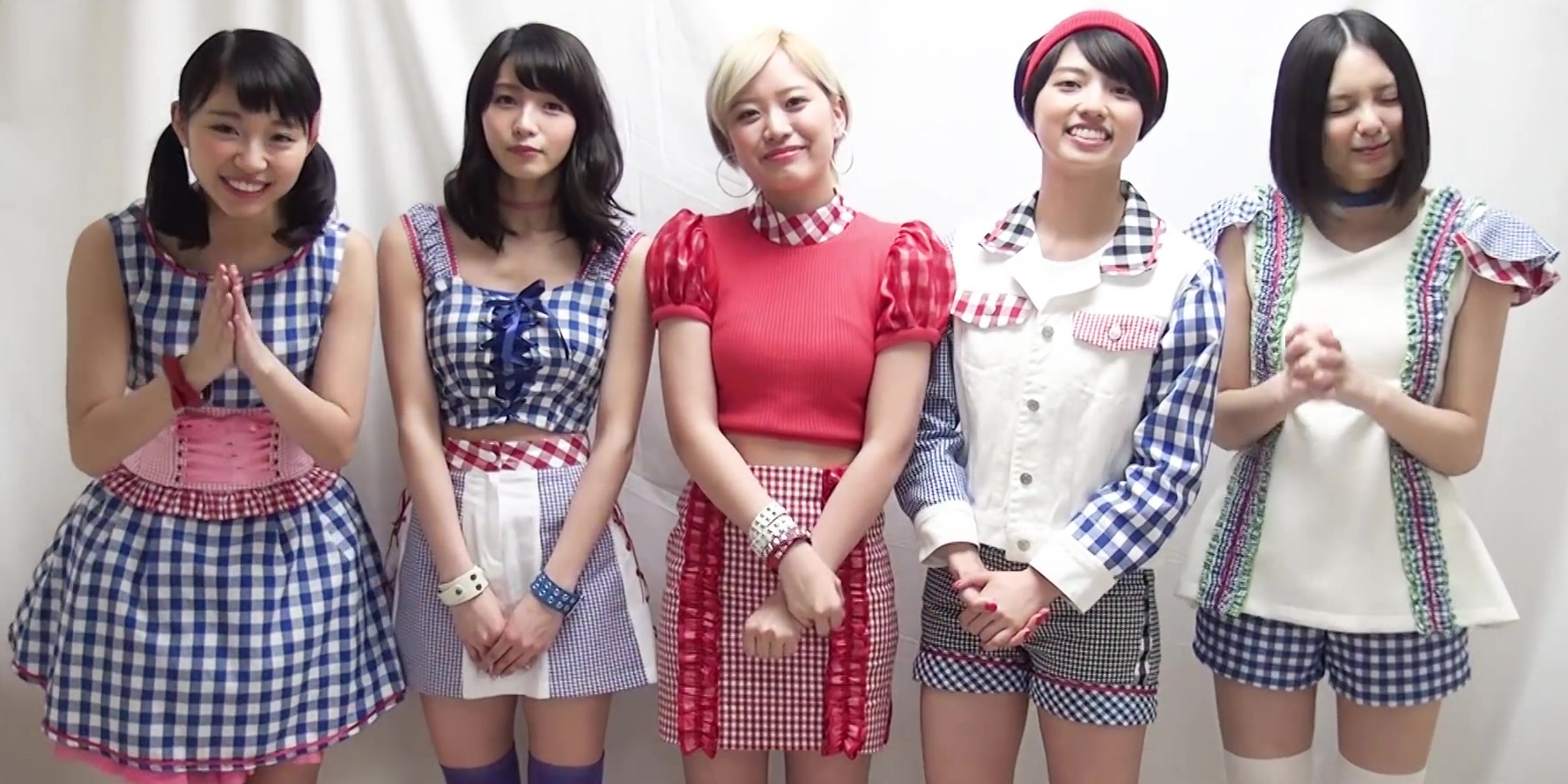

Background information
- Origin: Tokyo, Japan
- Genres: J-pop
- Years active: 2012–2018
- Label: Pony Canyon
- Website: babyraids.lespros.co.jp

Babyraids Japan (ベイビーレイズ JAPAN) was a Japanese idol group. The group disbanded after a final live show on September 24, 2018.

== Members ==
- Rikako Ōya (大矢梨華子, Ōya Rikako)
- Erika Denya (傳谷英里香, Denya Erika)
- Manatsu Hayashi (林愛夏, Hayashi Manatsu)
- Nao Takami (高見奈央, Takami Nao)
- Rio Watanabe (渡邊璃生, Watanabe Rio)

== Discography ==
=== Singles ===
Title	Year	Type	Oricon Weekly Single Chart
Babyraids (ベイビーレイズ)	2012	First Limited Edition A<CD+DVD> First Limited Edition B<CD+DVD> Regular Edition<CD>	19
Baby Revolution (ベイビーレボリューション)	2012	First Limited Edition A<CD+DVD> First Limited Edition B<CD+DVD> Regular Edition<CD>	15
JUMP	2013	First Limited Edition A<CD+DVD> First Limited Edition B<CD+DVD> Regular Edition<CD>	22
Baby Ambitious! (ベイビーアンビシャス!)	2013	First Limited Edition A<CD+DVD> First Limited Edition B<CD+DVD> First Limited Edition "Nama"<CD> Regular Edition<CD>	15
Koyomi no Ue de wa December (暦の上ではディセンバー)	2013	CD+DVD	6
Koi wa Panic (恋はパニック)	2014	First Limited Edition A<CD+DVD> First Limited Edition B<CD+DVD> Regular Edition<CD>	8
Bucchake Rock'n Hacchake Roll / Baby Step (ぶっちゃけRock'n はっちゃけRoll / ベイビーステップ)	2014	First Limited Edition A<CD+DVD> First Limited Edition B<CD+DVD> First Limited Edition C<CD> Regular Edition<CD>	4
Tora-Tora Tiger (虎虎タイガー!!)	2014	First Limited Edition A<CD+DVD> First Limited Edition B<CD+DVD> First Limited Edition C<CD+DVD> Regular Edition<CD>	5
2 years	2014	CD	8
Eikou Sunrise (栄光サンライズ)	2015	First Limited Edition A<CD+DVD> First Limited Edition B<CD+DVD> Regular Edition<CD>	5
Pretty Little Baby	2015	First Limited Edition A<CD+DVD> First Limited Edition B<CD+DVD> Regular Edition<CD>	9
Hashire, Hashire (走れ、走れ)	2016	First Limited Edition A<CD+DVD> First Limited Edition B<CD+DVD> Regular Edition<CD>	3
Senkō Believer (閃光Believer)	2016	First Limited Edition A<CD+DVD> First Limited Edition B<CD+DVD> Regular Edition<CD>	11
Baki Baki (バキバキ)	2017	First Limited Edition A<CD+DVD> First Limited Edition B<CD+DVD> Regular Edition<CD>	15
OOOOO (○○○○○)	2017	First Limited Edition A<CD+DVD> First Limited Edition B<CD+DVD> Regular Edition<CD>	17

=== Albums ===
Title	Year	Type	Oricon Weekly Single Chart
Jikoshōkai (自虎紹介)	2014	First Limited Edition A<2CDs> First Limited Edition B<CD+DVD> Regular Edition<CD>	14
Nippon Chu!Chu!Chu! (ニッポンChu!Chu!Chu!)	2016	First Limited Edition B<CD+DVD> First Limited Edition A<2CDs> Regular Edition<CD>	10

=== mini Albums ===
Title	Year	Type	Oricon Weekly Single Chart
THE BRJ	2017	First Limited Edition<CD+DVD> Regular Edition<CD>	11

=== Music videos ===
Title	Year	Type	Oricon Weekly Single Chart
Babyraids Densetsu no Raibu!: Kogun Funtō (ベイビーレイズ伝説の雷舞!-虎軍奮闘-)	2013	DVD	82
Babyraids Densetsu no Raibu!: Mōko Shūrai (ベイビーレイズ伝説の雷舞!-猛虎襲来-)	2014	DVD	46
babyraids Densetsu no Raibu!: Koko Ichiban (ベイビーレイズ伝説の雷舞!-虎虎壱番-)	2015	DVD	44
Babyraids Japan Summer Live 2015	2015	DVD/Blu-Ray	113
Babyraids Japan Dengeki no LIVE ! 2015 (ベイビーレイズJAPAN 電撃の雷舞! 2015)	2016	DVD/Blu-Ray	58
