= Riri (album) =

Studio album by Riri
- Released: February 14, 2018
- Recorded: 2016–2017
- Studios: Prime Sound Studio (Tokyo, Japan); Sony Music Studios (Tokyo); NK Sound (Tokyo)
- Genres: R&B; EDM
- Length: 36:32
- Label: Sony Music Associated Records
- Producers: Uta; Seiho; Miles Marques Sean II; Damon Sharpe; Juny Mag; Edsclusive; Brian Soko; Nikki Flores; Andy Love

Riri chronology
| Rush (2017) | Riri (2018) | Neo (2018) |

Riri (stylized as RIRI) is the debut studio album by Japanese singer Riri, released February 14, 2018, by Sony Music Associated Records. The album served as her major label debut following a record deal with Sony Music Entertainment Japan.

Three promotional singles were released prior to the release of the album. The first, a remix of "Rush" was released in November 2017. A second promotional single, "Keep Up" was released in December and a third, "Crush on You" was released in January 2018.

Upon its release, the album peaked at number 34 on the Oricon Albums Chart and number 18 on the Billboard Japan Hot Albums chart.

== Background ==
In 2016, Riri was discovered by Japanese-American singer-songwriter Ai and her recently launched talent agency, The Mic-a-holics, after winning a talent contest. Later that year, Riri released her debut extended play I Love to Sing under the agency. In 2017, her second EP Rush was released by The Mic-a-holics. Unlike her previous EP, Rush charted in Japan, debuting and peaking at number 70 on the Billboard Japan Hot Albums chart. Riri ultimately was scouted by Sony Music Japan and eventually was signed to Sony Music Associated Records.

== Development and production ==
Wanting to appeal overseas and Japanese listeners, Riri worked with both western and far eastern producers. Five previously released tracks from I Love to Sing and Rush were included and recorded in Japan while five new tracks were recorded in Los Angeles. She worked with various songwriters and producers such as Nikki Flores, Joacim Persson, Damon Sharpe, Uta, Ai, and Mayu Wakisaka.

== Music and lyrics ==
Riri has been described as an R&B and EDM album. Riri was influenced by artists such as Beyoncé, Mariah Carey and Whitney Houston. Riri's western appeal for the album was heavily influenced by Ai, who Riri has described as someone she "cherishes". In an interview with Oricon, Riri described "Promised Road" as a song about eventually having dreams come true.

== Track listing ==
Riri track listing
| No. | Title | Writer(s) | Producer(s) | Length |
|---|---|---|---|---|
| 1. | "Rush" | Andy Love; Joacim Persson; Johan Alkenäs; Nikki Flores; Riri Arai | Flores; Love | 3:16 |
| 2. | "Next to You" | Carlos Jenkins; Matthew Quinney; Miles Marques Sean II; Arai | Sean II | 3:16 |
| 3. | "That's My Baby" | Damon Sharpe; Jimmy Burney; Flores; Arai | Sharpe | 3:15 |
| 4. | "Heart Can't Lie" | Arai; Ale; Tido | Edsclusive | 3:33 |
| 5. | "Crush on You" | Adam Halliday; Brian Soko; Juny Mag; Arai | Soko | 3:53 |
| 6. | "Be Alright" | Arai; Mayu Wakisaka | Uta | 3:39 |
| 7. | "Keep Up" | Jenkins; Quinney; Sean II | Sean II | 3:17 |
| 8. | "Promised Road" | Arai | Uta | 3:30 |
| 9. | "Rush" (Seiho remix) | Love; Persson; Alkenäs; Flores; Arai | Flores; Love | 3:35 |
| 10. | "I Love to Sing" | Ai Carina Uemura; Arai | Uta | 5:14 |

=== Notes ===
- Certain digital stores display "2018 remastered" within the title of tracks 1–2, 4, 6 and 10
- Tracks 1 and 9 are stylized in all capitals
- Track 10 is stylized in sentence case

== Charts ==
Chart performance for Riri
| Chart (2018) | Peak position |
|---|---|
| Japan Hot Albums (Billboard Japan) | 18 |
| Japanese albums (Oricon) | 34 |

== Release history ==
Release history and formats for Riri
| Region | Date | Format(s) | Label | Ref. |
|---|---|---|---|---|
| Various | February 14, 2018 | Digital download; streaming | Sony Music Associated Records | |
| Japan | February 26, 2018 | CD | Sony Music Associated Records; Onenation | |
