= I (Ikimonogakari album) =

Studio album by Ikimono-gakari
- Released: July 24, 2013
- Genres: Pop, rock
- Label: Epic

Ikimono-gakari chronology
Barādon (2012)	I (2013)	Fun! Fun! Fanfare! (2014)

Singles from I
- 1. "Haru Uta" Released: April 25, 2012; 2. "Kaze ga Fuiteiru" Released: July 18, 2012; 3. "1 2 3 ~Koi ga Hajimaru~" Released: June 5, 2013; 4. "Egao" Released: July 10, 2013

I is the sixth studio album by Ikimono-gakari, released in Japan on July 24, 2013. It reached number one in the Oricon weekly charts for the week ending August 5 of that year making it the group's sixth consecutive number-one album. Consequently, Ikimono-gakari became the first mixed group in over seventeen years to achieve six consecutive number one albums on the Oricon weekly chart.

== Release ==
The album was released in Japan on July 24, 2013, in two editions. The regular edition (ESCL-4091), had for its first pressings an Ikimono card #036 and a raffle ticket for additional prizes which included a T-shirt and a hand fan. The limited edition (ESCL-4089-90) included a DVD featuring a radio interview "イッキーモンキーのiラジオ" Ikkey Monkey's (Note: "Ikkey Monkey" is the mascot of Ikimonogakari) iRadio, a twelve-sided panorama photo shoot of the Ikimono-gakari members and a special box packaging to display pictures of the three members.

The album contains five previously released tracks; four of which are A-side singles: "Haru Uta", "Kaze ga Fuiteiru", "1 2 3 ~Koi ga Hajimaru~" and "Egao". A fifth track, "Ashita no Sora", was the B-side to "1 2 3 ~Koi ga Hajimaru~".

Though to an extent a reference to the songwriters themselves, the title "I" is largely a reference to the fact that the band had intended the listeners to develop a personal connection with the album and to give the impression that the songs were being sung from the listener's perspective. "I" is also significant for being the most common letter of the alphabet in "Ikimonogakari" and (when pronounced phonetically) sounds not only like 愛 ai the Japanese for love but also 哀 ai the Japanese for sadness, a reference to the emotions the band hopes convey to the listeners.

== Themes ==
Love is a common theme throughout the album, referenced frequently in "1 2 3 ~Koi ga Hajimaru~", "Koiato", "Nannde" and "Renaishousetsu". Whereas "1 2 3 ~Koi ga Hajimaru~", in keeping with previous singles such as "Kimagure Romantic" and "Natuzora Graffiti", describes the light-hearted and optimistic first love of a teenage girl, the others describe experiences of being broken hearted from various stages of adulthood, a theme which has rarely featured in recent Ikimono-gakari singles. "Ascending to the Capital" is also a common theme throughout later tracks, in particular "Tōkyō" and "Nukumori" where the theme is used as a metaphor to describe the emotions experienced by Yoshioka and Yamashita respectively in leaving their home town in Kanagawa prefecture behind to pursue a recording contract in the Japanese music industry. Various tracks hold individual references to the phonetic reading of the album title "I": "Koiato" references 逢い ai, the Japanese for meeting (often a loved one and often by chance) and "Kaze Koute Hana Yureru" refers to 藍 ai the Japanese for indigo.

== Tie-ins ==
Tie-ins to media and commercial products.

- "Kaze ga Fuiteiru" was the theme song for the NHK broadcasts of the London 2012 Summer Olympics.
- "Haru Uta" was the theme song for the 2012 anime film Detective Conan: The Eleventh Striker.
- "Egao" was the theme song for the 2013 Pokémon film ExtremeSpeed Genesect: Mewtwo Awakens.
- "1 2 3 ~Koi ga Hajimaru~ " was used as a commercial song for Calpis in March 2013.
- "My Sunshine Story" was used as a commercial song for the Nissan Serena from June 2013.

== Tour ==
The release of the album was followed by a tour of Japan entitled "いきものがかりの みなさん、こんにつあー!! 2013 ～ I ～" (To all Ikimono-gakari fans, hello tour! 2013 ~I~). In August 2013, during the build up to the tour, Ikimono-gakari released four trailers on their official site which included: interviews with vocalist Kiyoe Yoshioka, leader Yoshiki Mizuno and recording engineer for the album Toshirō Kai; as well as footage from previous tours. A total of twenty-five concerts were held, the first concert being held at Sun Dome Fukui in Fukui on September 1, 2013, and the last in Sun Arena in Mie on December 7, 2013. Concerts were also held at: Yokohama Arena (Yokohama), Sendai Sekisui-Heim Super Arena (Sendai), Osaka-jō Hall (Osaka), Fukuoka Convention Center (Fukuoka), Makomanai Ice Arena (Sapporo), Ehime Budōkan (Ehime), Hiroshima Green Arena (Hiroshima), World Memorial Hall (Kobe), Ecopa Arena (Shizuoka), Nippon Budokan (Tokyo) and Nippon Gaishi Hall (Nagoya). Prior to the tour, it was expected that the tour would attract a total audience of two hundred thousand across the twenty-five concerts.

== Track listing ==
The source for romanized title tracks is Jpopasia.com (Source for track information: Ikimonogakari Official Site). English translations are unofficial.

No.	Title	Lyrics	Music	Arranger(s)	Length
1.	"Egao (笑顔, Smile)"	Yoshiki Mizuno	Y. Mizuno	Seiji Kameda	4:58
2.	"1 2 3 ~Koi ga Hajimaru~ (1 2 3 ～恋がはじまる～, 1 2 3 ~Love Begins~)"	Y. Mizuno	Y. Mizuno	Akimitsu Honma	4:57
3.	"Papapa~ya (ぱぱぱ～や)"	Y. Mizuno	Y. Mizuno	Akimitsu Honma	5:08
4.	"Koi Ato (恋跡, Mark of Love)"	Hotaka Yamashita	H. Yamashita	Yuusuke Tanaka, Takashi Kondō	4:43
5.	"Haru Uta (ハルウタ, Song of Spring)"	H. Yamashita	H. Yamashita	Ryou Eguchi, Strings arranged by: Ryou Eguchi, Tatsuya Murayama	4:53
6.	"Mai Sanshainn Sutōrī (マイサンシャインストーリー, My Sunshine Story)"	H. Yamashita	H. Yamashita	Masanori Shimada	5:25
7.	"Nannde (なんで, Why?)"	Y. Mizuno	Y. Mizuno	S. Kameda	6:04
8.	"Ashita no Sora (あしたのそら, Tomorrow's Sky)"	H. Yamashita	H. Yamashita	A. Honma	4:46
9.	"Kaze Koute Hana Yureru (風乞うて花揺れる, Ask for the Wind and the Flowers Sway)"	H. Yamashita	H. Yamashita	Kōichi Tsutaya	5:55
10.	"MONSTAR"	Y. Mizuno	Y. Mizuno	Daichi Hideyuki Suzuki	3:40
11.	"Renai Shousetsu (恋愛小説, Love Novel)"	Y. Mizuno	Y. Mizuno	S. Kameda	5:03
12.	"Tōkyō (東京, Tokyo)"	Kiyoe Yoshioka	K. Yoshioka	K. Tsutaya	4:23
13.	"Kaze ga Fuiteiru (風が吹いている, The Wind is Blowing)"	Y. Mizuno	Y. Mizuno	S. Kameda	7:43
14.	"Nukumori (ぬくもり, Warmth)"	H. Yamashita	H. Yamashita	M. Shimada	5:41
Total length:					73:24

== Release history ==
Country	Date	Format	Label
Japan	July 24, 2013	digital download	Epic Records Japan
Japan	July 24, 2013	CD (ESCL-4091), 2CD limited edition (ESCL-4089-90)	Epic Records Japan

== Charts ==
Chart (2013)	Peak positions	Sales
Japan Billboard Top Albums	1	112,082
Japan Oricon Weekly Albums Chart	1	112,082
