= First Place (band) =

Japanese pop band

- Also known as: 1/Place, 1/Class
- Origin: Japan
- Genres: Pop
- Years active: 2014–present
- Labels: Being Inc. (2018–2021); Firstplace (2021-)
- Members: Ryoma; Taihei
- Past members: Kento; Kaito
- Website: Official Website

First Place is a Japanese pop boy band, who made debut in 2018 with the single Sadame under the Being Inc. label. The song served as a theme song to the anime television series Detective Conan. Two members left the band in the years 2020–2021. In 2021, same their contract of the Being has ended. In 2022, they have resumed their activities as independent band.

== History ==
The formation of band has started in 2014 with members Kento and Taihei as a unit. In 2015, Ryoma and in 2017 Kaito jointed in the band. For the four years they have been active as a live street artist. In May, Kaito played main role in the musical Yume de Aima. In August 2018, they've made major debut with single Sadame which served as an ending theme for Anime television series Detective Conan under Being Inc. label. The album debuted at number 8 on the Oricon Weekly Single Chart and charted for 11 weeks.

In November 2018, they've held one-man live in AiiA Theater. On the same month, they've released second single Snow Light. In June 2019 they will release their first mini album L.D. Love with seven recorded tracks, including their debut single. Kaito provided lyrics for album track L.D.Love.

In 2020, KAITO has left the band and start started his solo career as a lyricist, composer under full name Kaito Okuzaki (奥﨑海斗) signed under the B Zone.

In June 2021, they've announced through website end of contract with the Being, three of them leaving agency and at same time share new address for their official website. In

In September 2022, Kento has announced withdrawal from the band through their official website.

In January 2023, they have released digital Lychee Sour, making it to be the band's new sound material for the first time in 4 years. In September 2023, Taihei has released his first solo digital single Sugar.

== Members ==
- Ryoma - birth 11 March 1995, (2018–present)
- Taihei - birth 21 August 1996 (2018–present)

=== Former members ===
- Kento - birth 9 October 1994 (2018–2021)
- Kaito - birth 18 October 1998 (2018–2020), currently active as Kaito Okuzaki (奥﨑海斗) (2020–present)

During the formation and beginning, the band consist of four members, as of 2023 the band consist of only two members.

== Discography ==
The band have released one mini-album, two singles and three digital singles.

=== Singles ===
	Release date	Title	Charts
1st	2018/08/29	"Sadame" (さだめ)	8
2nd	2018/11/13	"Snow Light"	11

=== Digital Singles ===
	Release date	Title	Reference
1st	2022/08/20	Lychee sour (ライチサワー)	
-	2023/01/09	Sakura (さくら)	
2nd	2023/03/29	Monochrome (モノクロ)	
3rd	2023/09/15	Kimi no Sei (君のせい)	

=== Mini albums ===
	Release date	Title	Charts
1st	2019/06/05	L.D.Love	8

== Interview ==
- Utaten: Sadame
- Musicvoice: Sadame

== Television appearances ==
- LiveB (TBS)
- Buzzrhythm02 (NTV)
