= Chelsy (Japanese band) =

Japanese band

- Origin: Japan
- Genres: Pop rock; j-pop; rock
- Years active: 2011–2018
- Labels: SMAR; Honey Bee Studio
- Past members: MIO (vocals and guitar); SHIZUKA (bass guitar); AMI (drums); ARISA (keyboard)
- Website: chelsy-official.com

Chelsy laranang was a three-piece Japanese pop rock and J-pop girl band signed to SMAR. They are known for the insert song "I will" in the Ao Haru Ride anime. The band disbanded in May 2018.

== Discography ==
- I'LL BE ON MY WAY (released 19 March 2014)
- I will / Animation EP (released 24 September 2014)
- YES / Good-bye girl (released 3 December 2014)
- SistAr(released 27 May 2015)
