= Barādon =

Barādon バラー丼

Greatest hits album by Ikimono-gakari
- Released: December 19, 2012 (Japan)
- Genre: J-pop, pop rock
- Length: 79:06
- Language: Japanese
- Label: EPIC

Ikimono-gakari chronology
Newtral (2012)	Barādon バラー丼 (2012)	I (2013)

Singles from Barādon
- 1. "SAKURA" Released: March 5, 2006; 2. "Koisuru Otome" Released: October 18, 2006; 3. "Akaneiro no Yakusoku" Released: October 24, 2007; 4. "Kaeritaku Natta yo" Released: April 16, 2008; 5. "Planetarium" Released: October 15, 2008; 6. "Futari" Released: May 27, 2009; 7. "YELL" Released: September 23, 2009; 8. "Arigatō" Released: May 5, 2010; 9. "Aruite Ikō" Released: November 23, 2011; 10. "Kaze ga Fuiteiru" Released: July 18, 2012

Barādon (バラー丼) is the first ballad greatest hits album released by Japanese pop rock band Ikimono-gakari. It was released on December 19, 2012 and contains twelve previously released tracks plus a version of the single "Kaze ga Fuiteiru" recorded in the United Kingdom. Having sold 108,000 copies in its first week of sales, it reached number 1 on the Oricon weekly charts for the week ending December 31, 2012 making it the group's fifth consecutive number one album. Consequently, Ikimono-gakari became the first mixed group in over sixteen years to achieve five consecutive number one albums on the Oricon weekly chart.

== Release ==
=== Editions ===
The album was released in Japan on December 19, 2012 in two editions: the regular edition (ESCL-4010) and the limited edition (ESCL-4008-9). As well as the CD contained in the regular edition, the limited edition contained an Ikimono-gakari Barādon scarf and the Ikimono card #031.

=== Title ===
The title is a combination of the words "ballad" and "donburi"(丼), the latter being a rice dish served with a variety of fish, meat and vegetable toppings served in an oversized rice bowl. The band claim to have decided upon the name whilst touring in Sapporo, Hokkaidō. Originally the band's guitarist, Yamashita Hotaka, was planning on naming the album "バラードだべ" (Barādo-dabe) where "dabe" is a copula in the Hokkaidō dialect, but the band settled for the current title after concluding that "Barādo-dabe" was of poor quality. As a result of the use of "donburi" in the title, the lead singer (Kiyoe Yoshioka) and the two guitarists (Yoshiki Mizuno and Hotaka Yamashita) dressed up as a restaurant landlady and Itamaes respectively for both promotional appearances and the album cover.

== Track list ==
Source for romanized title tracks: Jpopasia.com

No.	Title	Lyrics	Music	Length
1.	"Kaze ga Fuiteiru -UK recorded version- (風が吹いている -UK recorded version-, The Wind is Blowing)"	Yoshiki Mizuno	Y. Mizuno
2.	"Arigatō (ありがとう, Thank you)"	Y. Mizuno
3.	"Planetarium (プラネタリウム)"	Y. Mizuno	Y. Mizuno
4.	"Kaeritaku Natta yo (帰りたくなったよ, I Want to go Home, Now)"	Y. Mizuno	Y. Mizuno
5.	"SAKURA"	Y. Mizuno	Y. Mizuno
6.	"YELL"	Y. Mizuno	Y. Mizuno
7.	"Aruiteikō -piano intro version- (歩いていこう -piano intro version-, Let's Walk)"	Y. Mizuno	Y. Mizuno
8.	"Kokoro no Hana wo Sakaseyō (心の花を咲かせよう, Grow the Flower of your Heart)"	Hotaka Yamashita	H. Yamashita
9.	"Akane Iro no Yakusoku (茜色の約束, The Madder Red Promise)"	Y. Mizuno	Y. Mizuno
10.	"Futari (ふたり, The Two of Us)"	Y. Mizuno	Y. Mizuno
11.	"Ashita e Mukau Kaerimichi (明日へ向かう帰り道, The Road Back to Tomorrow)"	H. Yamashita	H. Yamashita
12.	"Koisuruotome (コイスルオトメ, Loved Maiden)"	Y. Mizuno	Y. Mizuno
13.	"Kaze ga Fuiteiru (風が吹いている, The Wind is Blowing)"	Y. Mizuno	Y. Mizuno

== Release history ==
Country	Date	Format	Label
Japan	December 19, 2012	digital download	Epic Records Japan
Japan	December 19, 2012	CD (ESCL-4010), limited edition CD (ESCL-4008-9)	Epic Records Japan

== Charts ==
Chart (2012)	Peak positions	Sales	References
Japan Oricon Weekly Albums Chart	1	108,000	
Japan Billboard Top Albums	1	108,000	
