= Fun! Fun! Fanfare! =

Studio album by Ikimono-gakari
- Released: December 24, 2014
- Genre: Pop-rock
- Length: 71:46
- Label: Epic

Ikimono-gakari chronology
I (2013)	Fun! Fun! Fanfare! (2014)	Chō Ikimonobakari - Tennen Kinen Members BEST Selection (2016)

Fun! Fun! Fanfare! (stylized as FUN! FUN! FANFARE!) is the seventh album by the Japanese pop-rock band Ikimono-gakari. It was released on December 24, 2014, and reached number one on the Oricon Albums Chart.

== Track list ==
No.	Title	Length
1.	"FUN! FUN! FANFARE! -The Beginning-" (instrumental)	0:40
2.	"Golden Girl"	4:59
3.	"Love Song wa Tomaranai yo" (ラブソングはとまらないよ)	5:33
4.	"Netsujou no Spectrum" (熱情のスペクトラム)	3:44
5.	"Kirari" (キラリ)	5:03
6.	"Life"	4:54
7.	"Haru" (春)	5:54
8.	"Ashita Hareru ka na" (明日ハレルカナ)	4:50
9.	"Jump!" (ジャンプ！)	4:42
10.	"Niji" (虹)	4:22
11.	"Kagerou" (陽炎)	5:02
12.	"Snow Again"	6:43
13.	"One Goal" (ワンゴール)	4:04
14.	"Namida ga Kieru Nara" (涙がきえるなら)	4:30
15.	"My Stage" (マイステージ)	5:35
16.	"LIGHTS OUT -The Ending-" (instrumental)	1:00
