= Hajimari no Uta =

Hajimari no Uta ハジマリノウタ

Studio album by Ikimonogakari
- Released: December 23, 2009 (Japan)
- Recorded: 2009
- Genre: Pop, (Note: The iTunes listing classified the genre as Pop.) rock
- Length: 66:08
- Label: Epic

Ikimonogakari chronology
My Song Your Song (2008)	Hajimari no Uta ハジマリノウタ (2009)	Ikimonobakari: Members Best Selection (2010)

Singles from My song Your song
- 1. "Futari" Released: May 27, 2009; 2. "Hotaru no Hikari" Released: July 15, 2009; 3. "YELL/Joyful" Released: September 23, 2009; 4. "Nakumonka" Released: November 11, 2009

Hajimari no Uta (ハジマリノウタ, First Song) is the fourth studio album by Ikimonogakari, released in Japan on December 23, 2009. A limited-edition version included a bonus DVD with footage from their concert "Ikimono Gakari no Minasan, Konni Tour!! 2009 - My song Your song -" performance on May 25, 2009 at Shibuya C.C. Lemon Hall, plus special booklet, and ikimono card 017.

The song "Hotaru no Hikari", was known for the fifth opening sequence in Naruto: Shippuden.

== Track list ==
No.	Title	Lyrics	Music	Arranger(s)	Length
1.	"Hajimari no Uta 〜Tōi Sora Sunde〜"	Hotaka Yamashita	H. Yamashita	Masanori Shimada	5:58
2.	"Yumemidai"	H. Yamashita	H. Yamashita	Atsushi Yuasa	4:10
3.	"Joyful"	Yoshiki Mizuno	Y. Mizuno	Yusuke Tanaka, Takashi Kondo	3:15
4.	"YELL"	Y. Mizuno	Y. Mizuno	Masataka Matsutoya	5:54
5.	"Nakumonka"	Y. Mizuno	Y. Mizuno	Akimitsu Honma	5:46
6.	"Mahiru no Tsuki"	H. Yamashita	H. Yamashita	A. Honma	5:11
7.	"Hotaru no Hikari"	Y. Mizuno	Y. Mizuno	Ryo Eguchi, Strings arranged by: Crusher Kimura	4:02
8.	"Akizakura"	H. Yamashita	H. Yamashita	A. Honma	4:52
9.	"Futari -Album version-"	Y. Mizuno	Y. Mizuno	M. Shimada	6:20
10.	"Tenohira no Oto"	H. Yamashita	H. Yamashita	Taichi Nakamura	5:06
11.	"How to make it"	H. Yamashita	H. Yamashita	Tōru Hidaka	4:51
12.	"Mirai Wakusei"	Kiyoe Yoshioka	K. Yoshioka	Susumu Nishikawa, Strings arranged by: eji	5:26
13.	"Ashita e Mukau Kaerimichi"	H. Yamashita	H. Yamashita	Norihito Sumitomo	4:45

== Oricon Chart (Japan) ==
Release	Albums chart	Peak position	Debut sales (copies)	Sales total (copies)
December 23, 2009	Daily Chart	1	-	561,957
December 23, 2009	Weekly Chart	1	200,286	561,957
December 23, 2009	Monthly Chart (February 2010)	1	242,080	561,957
December 23, 2009	Yearly Chart (2010)	8	560,931	561,957

== Awards and nominations ==
=== Japan Record Awards ===
The Japan Record Awards is a major music awards show held annually in Japan by the Japan Composer's Association.

Year	Nominee / work	Award	Result
2010	Hajimari no Uta	Best Album Award	Won

Preceded by Shio, Koshō (Greeeen)	Japan Record Award for the Best Album; 2010	Succeeded by Domo (Kazumasa Oda)
