= Sakura Saku Machi Monogatari =

Studio album by Ikimonogakari
- Released: March 7, 2007
- Recorded: 2005–2007
- Studio: aLive Recording Studio (Tokyo); Sony Music Studios (Tokyo); Aobadai Studio (Tokyo); WhiteBase Studio (Tokyo)
- Genre: Pop
- Length: 63:58
- Label: Epic
- Producer: Eiji Saibara

Ikimonogakari chronology
Sakura Saku Machi Monogatari (2007)	Life Album (2008)

Singles from Sakura Saku Machi Monogatari
- 1. "Sakura" Released: March 15, 2006; 2. "Hanabi" Released: May 31, 2006; 3. "Koisuru Otome" Released: October 18, 2006; 4. "Ryūsei Miracle" Released: December 6, 2006; 5. "Uruwashiki Hito/Seishun no Tobira" Released: February 14, 2007

Sakura Saku Machi Monogatari (桜咲く街物語, Sakura Saku Machi Monogatari, lit. "The Story of Town Where Cherry Blossoms Bloom") is the first album by Japanese pop music trio Ikimonogakari, released on March 7, 2007 by Epic Records Japan. All of the album's songs were written and composed by members Yoshiki Mizuno and Hotaka Yamashita. Sakura Saku Machi Monogatari is primarily a pop rock record with influences of folk pop, with its lyrics depicting love and scenes in all four seasons.

Sakura Saku Machi Monogatari received positive reviews from music critics who praised the vocals of frontwoman Kiyoe Yoshioka and the album's production. Commercially, although it only reached number four on the Oricon Albums Chart, Sakura Saku Machi Monogatari was a long-running hit, staying on the charts for nearly two years. Its cumulative sales, although only slightly, exceed those of its follow-up, Life Album (2008). It was eventually certified platinum by the Recording Industry Association of Japan (RIAJ) for selling over 250,000 copies nationwide.

To promote Sakura Saku Machi Monogatari, Ikimonogakari released five singles: "Sakura" was released as the band's debut single on March 15, 2006. It became a commercial success, reaching the top twenty on the Oricon Singles Chart, selling 500,000 ringtones and 750,000 full-length downloads. The follow-up single "Hanabi" also found success, becoming their first single to crack the top ten on the Oricon Singles Chart. The following three singles would go on to find varying degrees of success. Between May 24 to June 14, 2007, the trio went on a live tour to support this album.

== Background and production ==
Yoshiki Mizuno and Hotaka Yamashita planned to form a unit with a female vocalist after forming Ikimonogakari in February 1999, and as a result, Kiyoe Yoshioka, the younger sister of their classmate, joined the group on November 3, 1999. The first song they performed as a trio was "Natsuiro" by Yuzu. With Mizuno and Yamashita preparing to take university entrance exams, Ikimonogakari decided to disband, and held a farewell concert on the street in front of Hon-Atsugi Station on September 17, 2000. The group got back together in February 2003 and gathered support band members to expand their activities from the street live style to playing at live houses. They resumed street live in April.

On June 2, 2003, they held a one-man live at the live house Thunder Snake Atsugi in Atsugi City. A staff member from Cube, who would later become Ikimonogakari's first manager, attended this live, which became the opportunity for them to make their debut in the world. The trio went on to release their first indie album Makoto ni Senetsu Nagara First Album wo Koshiraemashita... on August 25, 2003. Ikimonogakari joined Cube in 2004, and at a showcase concert hosted by Cube, where record companies gathered, they caught the eye of Epic Records Japan, who were the only record company to take notice of them. The majority of their major-label debut album's songwriting and composition was overseen by Mizuno and Yamashita.

Mizuno had written the songs on Sakura Saku Machi Monogatari and the group had recorded them from 2005 to 2007. The album was recorded in various studios in Tokyo, Japan, and was mastered by Mitsuyasu Abe at Sony Music Studios in Tokyo. When deciding on the album's track list, the group decided to put the most well-known song “Sakura” as the opening track of their debut album, and then add an acoustic version of “Sakura” as a bonus track at the end to make it sound as if the seasons are passing by.

== Composition ==
Sakura Saku Machi Monogatari is a pop rock and folk pop record depicting love and scenes in all four seasons. According to Tower Records, it is an album with various emotions and scenes from spring, summer, autumn and winter that unfold as one "town story" and carries a fast-paced sound and "nostalgic" song titles with a Japanese atmosphere. As the title Sakura Saku Machi Monogatari suggests, the album is a "dramatic album" that unfolds in the four seasons in a town where cherry blossoms bloom, with its goal being to make the listeners empathize with the characters in the album.

The album begins with "Sakura," a power ballad with a springtime theme. "Kira Kira Train" sings of the feelings of a man and a woman in a long-distance relationship with an acoustic sound. "Hanabi" is an upbeat number with a powerful harmonica. "Kimi to Aruita Kisetsu" is a medium-tempo tune that depicts worrying about a lover's future as he takes a new step forward without showing any guilt. "Koisuru Otome" is a "heart-warming" love ballad. "Ryūsei Miracle" is a number with a pop melody and simple chord progression. "Seishun no Tobira" is a dance rock tune featuring Yuichi Sakurai (Art-School) and Tsutomu Wada (Stereo Fabrication of Youth).

"Hinageshi" is a song influenced by Showa era pop music and carries bluesy guitar riffs and fragile vocals. "Hot Milk" is an optimistic rock tune. "Iroha ni Ho e To" is a song with the simplicity of a nursery rhyme and the freedom of a jam session. "Uruwashiki Hito" is a pop rock number that sings about life-sized "love" with a youthful and aggressive sound. "Natsu Koi" is a summer tune on which each of the three members takes charge of vocals. "Tayumu Koto Naki Nagare no Naka de" is a grand medium-tempo ballad featuring strings. The album's closing track is an acoustic version of the group's debut single, replacing the grandiose strings heard in the original with the gentle sound of the keyboard.

== Release and formats ==
Sakura Saku Machi Monogatari was released as Ikimonogakari's major-label debut album on March 7, 2007. It contains 14 songs in total, including the six A-side singles from their debut single "Sakura" to their fifth single "Uruwashiki Hito/Seishun no Tobira," some coupling songs, and the bonus track "Sakura -acoustic version-." The first press limited edition came in a box with a special booklet. Of the six singles included, three—"Hanabi," "Ryusei Miracle," and "Seishun no Tobira"—have not been included in a greatest hits album, the most of any of Ikimonogakari's original albums.

== Promotion ==
=== Singles and other songs ===
Five singles were released to promote Sakura Saku Machi Monogatari. "Sakura" was released as the band's debut single on March 15, 2006. The single peaked at number seventeen on the Oricon Singles Chart, and was certified gold by the Recording Industry Association of Japan (RIAJ) for exceeding 100,000 unit shipments. "Sakura" was also certified double platinum for selling over 500,000 ringtones, and triple platinum for selling over 750,000 full-length downloads. "Hanabi" was released as the follow-up single on May 31, 2006, becoming their first single to peak within the top ten on Oricon by peaking at number five. "Hanabi" was certified gold twice by the RIAJ for selling over 100,000 physical copies and digital downloads each.

"Koisuru Otome" was released as the album's third single on October 18, 2006. It peaked at number fifteen on the Oricon Singles Chart, and was certified platinum by the RIAJ for selling over 250,000 downloads. The album's fourth single, "Ryūsei Miracle," was released on December 6, 2006. It peaked at number 22 on the singles chart, making it the only Ikimonogakari work not to enter the top twenty of the Oricon charts. "Uruwashiki Hito / Seishun no Tobira" was released as a double A-side single and the album's final single on February 14, 2007. It peaked at number seventeen on Oricon, while "Uruwashiki Hito" was certified gold for selling over 100,000 downloads.

Many of the songs in this album were used as theme songs or in TV commercials. "Hanabi" was used the seventh ending theme song for the anime series Bleach. "Ryūsei Miracle" was used as a theme song for the anime Ghost Slayers Ayashi. "Seishun no Tobira" was used as the theme song to Japanese release of the movie Monster House. The lead single song "Sakura" was used in a commercial advertisement promoting NTT Denpo115. "Uruwashiki Hito" was used in a commercial to promote Coca-Cola.

=== Live performances ===
On April 15, 2006, Ikimonogakari held a free homecoming concert in Atsugi Sun Park at their hometown in Atsugi City, Kanagawa Prefecture, drawing 2,000 spectators. On June 4, 2006, the band held a free live homecoming concert in their hometown of Ebina to celebrate the release of their second single "Hanabi" on May 31; the concert was held at Ebina Vinawalk and attracted an astounding 5,000 people. On March 11, 2007, Ikimonogakari held a free live at their hometown, at Vinawalk, in front of 7,000 fans. In May 2007, the group embarked on a nationwide concert tour entitled "Ikimonogakari no Minna-san, Konnichiwa!! 2007 ~Sakura Saku Machi Monogatari~."

== Reception ==
Professional ratings
Review scores
Source	Rating
CD Journal	(positive)
Tower Records	(positive)

Sakura Saku Machi Monogatari received positive reviews from music critics. A mini-review from CD Journal stated: "Despite their innocent looks, they display a wide range of talent, from dramatic ballads to lively pop songs and rock numbers. The album is packed with singles with tie-ups, and you can trace their progress." Sudo Takehiro from Bounce's April 2007 issue was very positive when reviewing the album, calling Yoshioka's singing voice adorable and stated that the simple performances and songs create a lovely triangle leaving a great impression.

Commercially, Sakura Saku Machi Monogatari was a success. In Japan, Sakura Saku Machi Monogatari debuted at number four on the weekly Oricon Albums Chart, opening with sales of 53,254 copies. It dropped to number nine the following week, logging sales of 27,318 copies. Despite these initial sales, Sakura Saku Machi Monogatari became a long-seller, staying on the charts for an impressive 148 weeks. It sold approximately 158,101 copies by the end of 2007, making it the 78th best-selling album of the year. The album was certified platinum by the Recording Industry Association of Japan (RIAJ) for shipments of 250,000 units in July 2008, and has sold about 260,684 copies in Japan according to Oricon. According to Oricon Style, it is Ikimonogakari's seventh best-selling album overall.

== Track listing ==
No.	Title	Lyrics	Music	Arranger(s)	Length
1.	"Sakura"	Yoshiki Mizuno	Y. Mizuno	Masanori Shimada	5:54
2.	"Kira Kira Train" (KIRA★KIRA★TRAIN "Sparkling Train")	Y. Mizuno	Y. Mizuno	M. Shimada	5:28
3.	"Hanabi"	Y. Mizuno	Y. Mizuno	Ryo Eguchi	4:27
4.	"Kimi to Aruita Kisetsu" (君と歩いた季節 "The Season I Walked with You")	Y. Mizuno	Y. Mizuno	Atsushi Yuasa	4:04
5.	"Koisuru Otome"	Y. Mizuno	Y. Mizuno	Yusuke Tanaka	5:16
6.	"Ryūsei Miracle"	Y. Mizuno	Y. Mizuno	Westfield	4:08
7.	"Seishun no Tobira" (青春のとびら "Door of Youth")	Y. Mizuno	Y. Mizuno	Westfield	2:58
8.	"Hinageshi" (ひなげし "Poppy")	Hotaka Yamashita	H. Yamashita	A. Yuasa	3:02
9.	"Hot Milk" (ホットミルク Hotto Miruku)	H. Yamashita, Y. Mizuno	Y. Mizuno	Seiji Kameda	4:59
10.	"Iroha ni Ho e To" (いろはにほへと Even the Blossoming Flowers)	H. Yamashita	H. Yamashita	R. Eguchi	2:30
11.	"Uruwashiki Hito" (うるわしきひと "Beautiful Person")	Y. Mizuno	Y. Mizuno	R. Eguchi	4:30
12.	"Natsu Koi" (夏・コイ "Summer Love")	H. Yamashita	H. Yamashita	Y. Tanaka	5:58
13.	"Tayumu Koto Naki Nagare no Naka de" (タユムコトナキナガレノナカデ "In a Ceaseless Flow")	H. Yamashita	H. Yamashita	M. Shimada	6:22
14.	"Sakura (Acoustic Version)" (Bonus Track)	Y. Mizuno	Y. Mizuno	M. Shimada	4:26

== Charts ==
=== Weekly charts ===
Chart (2007)	Peak position
Japanese Albums (Oricon)	4

=== Year-end charts ===
Chart (2007)	Position
Japanese Albums (Oricon)	78

== Certification and sales ==
Region	Certification	Certified units/sales
Japan (RIAJ)	Platinum	260,684
