= Ikimonobakari: Members Best Selection =

Album by Ikimono-gakari

Ikimono-bakari Members BEST Selection いきものばかり 〜メンバーズBESTセレクション〜

Greatest hits album by Ikimono-gakari
- Released: November 3, 2010
- Genre: J-pop, pop rock
- Length: 158:58
- Language: Japanese
- Label: EPIC Japan

Ikimono-gakari chronology
Hajimari no Uta (2009)	Ikimono-bakari Members BEST Selection いきものばかり 〜メンバーズBESTセレクション〜 (2010)	Newtral (2012)

Singles from Ikimono-bakari Members BEST Selection
- 1. "Nostalgia" Released: March 10, 2010; 2. "Arigato" Released: May 5, 2010; 3. "Kimi ga Iru" Released: August 4, 2010

Ikimono-bakari Members Best Selection (いきものばかり～メンバーズBESTセレクション～) is Japanese pop rock band Ikimono-gakari's first greatest hits album. It was released on November 3, 2010, by Sony Music Entertainment Japan. The album features 31 previously released tracks and three new songs: "Ima Hashiridaseba", "Spirits", and "Kaze to Mirai".

It was released in two versions: a regular 2CD edition and a limited 2CD+DVD edition. The first press regular edition contains an ikimono-card 021. The limited edition contains a double-sided ikimono-land/member poster, an ikimono-land card, an ikimono-land sticker, two ikimono-land postcards, ikimono-card 021, and an application card to enter a lottery for ikimono-gakari goods. The bonus DVD contains a 115-minute documentary, "ikiiki TV", featuring member commentary on all the songs.

The album was certified 'Million' by the Recording Industry Association of Japan for shipment of one million copies. To commemorate this achievement, a limited 2CD winter jacket edition was shipped out between December 17, 2010, and January 2011.

== Track listing ==
CD1
No.	Title	Lyrics	Music	Arranger(s)	Length
1.	"Sakura"	Yoshiki Mizuno	Yoshiki Mizuno	Masanori Shimada	5:54
2.	"Uruwashiki Hito" (うるわしきひと / "The lovely one")	Yoshiki Mizuno	Yoshiki Mizuno	Ryo Eguchi	4:30
3.	"Seishun Line" (青春ライン / "Youth line")	Yoshiki Mizuno	Yoshiki Mizuno	Ryo Eguchi	3:58
4.	"Akaneiro no Yakusoku" (茜色の約束 / "Madder-Colored)	Yoshiki Mizuno	Yoshiki Mizuno	Masanori Shimada
5.	"Kira Kira Train"	Yoshiki Mizuno	Yoshiki Mizuno	Masanori Shimada
6.	"Nostalgia" (ノスタルジア)	Yoshiki Mizuno	Yoshiki Mizuno	Masanori Shimada
7.	"Mirai Wakusei" (未来惑星 / "Future planet")	Kiyoe Yoshioka	Kiyoe Yoshioka	Susumu Nishikawa, Strings arranged by: eji
8.	"Natsu Koi -2010 version-" (夏・コイ/ "summer love" /Rearranged version)	Hotaka Yamashita	Hotaka Yamashita	Akimitsu Honma
9.	"Tayumu Koto na Kinagare no Naka de" (タユムコトナキナガレノナカデ / "Relaxing in a ceaseless flow")	Hotaka Yamashita	Hotaka Yamashita	Masanori Shimada
10.	"Ima Hashiridaseba" (今走り出せば / "If you start running now")	Hotaka Yamashita	Hotaka Yamashita	Susumu Nishikawa
11.	"Hana wa Sakura Kimi wa Utsukushi" (花は桜 君は美し / Flowers are cherry blossoms; you're beautiful)	Yoshiki Mizuno	Yoshiki Mizuno	Zentaro Watanabe
12.	"Soprano" (ソプラノ)	Hotaka Yamashita	Hotaka Yamashita	Masanori Shimada
13.	"Tsuki to Atashi to Reizouko" (月とあたしと冷蔵庫 / "The moon, myself, and a refrigerator")	Hotaka Yamashita, Kiyoe Yoshioka	Hotaka Yamashita	Ikimonogakari, Ryo Eguchi
14.	"Nokori Kaze" (残り風 / "Remnant wind")	Hotaka Yamashita	Hotaka Yamashita	Yusuke Itagaki, Atsushi Yuasa
15.	"Koisuru Otome" (コイスルオトメ / "Loved maiden")	Yoshiki Mizuno	Yoshiki Mizuno	Yusuke Tanaka, Strings arranged by: Ittetsu Gen
Total length:					79:11

CD2
No.	Title	Writer(s)	Arranger(s)	Length
1.	"Kimagure Romantic" (気まぐれロマンティック / "capricious romantic")	Y. Mizuno	R. Eguchi, Strings arranged by: Crusher Kimura
2.	"Blue Bird" (ブルーバード)	Y. Mizuno	R. Eguchi, Strings arranged by: Crusher Kimura
3.	"Joyful" (じょいふる)	Y. Mizuno	Y. Tanaka, Takashi Kondo
4.	"Kokoro no Hana wo Sakaseyou" (心の花を咲かせよう / "Let's make the flowers of our hearts bloom")	H. Yamashita	M. Shimada
5.	"Yell"	Y. Mizuno	Masataka Matsutoya
6.	"Kimi ga Iru" (キミがいる / "You're here")	Kiyoe Yoshioka	M. Shimada
7.	"Chikokushichau yo" (ちこくしちゃうよ / "I'll be late")	H. Yamashita (lyrics&music), Kiyoe Yoshioka (lyrics)	S. Nishikawa
8.	"Happy Smile Again"	Y. Mizuno	Hiroaki Sugawara
9.	"Arigatou" (ありがとう/ "thank you")	Y. Mizuno	A. Honma
10.	"Yuki Yamanu Yoru Futari -2010 version-" (雪やまぬ夜二人 / "Two in the night with endless snow" / Rearranged version)	H. Yamashita	M. Matsutoya
11.	"Kuchizuke" (くちづけ / "Kiss")	H. Yamashita	S Nishikawa
12.	"Spirits" (スピリッツ)	Y. Mizuno	R. Eguchi
13.	"Kaze to Mirai" (風と未来 / "The wind and the future")	H. Yamashita	Y. Tanaka, A. Kondo, Atsushi Yuasa, Strings arranged by: Ittetsu Gen
14.	"Nokori Kaze" (残り風 / "Remnant wind")	H. Yamashita	Yusuke Itagaki, A. Yuasa
15.	"Nakumonka" (なくもんか / "No more cry")	Y. Mizuno	A. Honma
16.	"Kaeritakunatta yo" (帰りたくなったよ / "I wanted to go home")	Y. Mizuno	M. Shimada
Total length:				79:47

DVD (Limited Edition only)
No.	Title	Length
1.	"Ikiiki TV the first time" (イキイキTV the first time)
2.	"Ikiiki TV the last time" (イキイキTV the last time)

== Charts ==
Chart (2010)	Peak position
Oricon Daily Chart	1
Oricon Weekly Chart	1
World Chart	1

- Total reported sales: 1,198,523
- Total sales in 2010: 906,756 (2010 Oricon Top 100 Albums - #2 album of the year)
- Total sales in 2011: 292,767
