= Kiyoe Yoshioka =

Kiyoe Yoshioka 吉岡 聖恵
- Born: February 29, 1984 (age 42); Shizuoka, Shizuoka Prefecture, Japan
- Years active: 1999–present
- Label: Epic Records Japan
- Member of: Ikimonogakari
- Website: www.yoshiokakiyoe.com

Kiyoe Yoshioka (吉岡 聖恵, Yoshioka Kiyoe; born February 29, 1984) is a Japanese singer and vocalist. She is best known for being the lead vocalist of the band Ikimonogakari since its founding in 1999. She has also been active as a solo singer, releasing her first album Utairo in 2018. In 2022 her song "Dekoboko" was used as the first opening theme to the anime series A Couple of Cuckoos.

== Biography ==
Yoshioka was born in Shizuoka on February 29, 1984. She moved to Atsugi, Kanagawa Prefecture when she was five years old. She had an interest in music from an early age, learning to play the piano at the age of five. She would go on to study music at the Showa University of Music Junior College.

Yoshioka's music career began in 1999 when she became vocalist of the band Ikimonogakari. The band would temporarily disband the following year, but would reform in 2003. It made its major debut in 2006 with the release of the single "Sakura", with Yoshioka as vocalist.

In 2010, Ikimonogakari performed the song "Egao", which was used as the theme song to the anime film Pokémon the Movie: Genesect and the Legend Awakened. Yoshioka made a vocal cameo in the film, voicing an Eevee.

Yoshioka started a solo career after Ikimonogakari went on hiatus in 2017. Her first solo release, an album titled Utairo (うたいろ), was released on October 24, 2018. The album included the official recording of "World in Union" for the following year's Rugby World Cup. While Ikimonogakari resumed its activities later that year, Yoshioka would continue her solo career.

Yoshioka released her first solo single "Massara" (まっさら) on December 22, 2021. Her second single, "Dekoboko" (凸凹), was released on June 15, 2022; the title song was used as the first opening theme to the anime television series A Couple of Cuckoos.

== Personal life ==
In 2020, Yoshioka announced that she had married a man outside the entertainment industry. In June 2022 she announced that she was pregnant with her first child. In October 2022, she announced the birth of her child.

== Discography ==
=== Albums ===
- Utairo (うたいろ) (Release date: October 24, 2018)

=== Singles ===
- "Massara" (まっさら) (Release date: December 22, 2021)
- "Dekoboko" (凸凹) (Release date: June 15, 2022)
