= Ikimonogakari =

Japanese band

- Origin: Kanagawa Prefecture
- Genres: Pop rock; soft rock
- Years active: 1999–present
- Labels: Thunder Snake, Cubit Club, Epic
- Members: Kiyoe Yoshioka; Yoshiki Mizuno
- Past members: Hotaka Yamashita
- Website: www.ikimonogakari.com

Ikimonogakari (いきものがかり) is a Japanese pop rock duo from Kanagawa Prefecture, Japan consisting of Yoshiki Mizuno and Kiyoe Yoshioka. The group started in February 1999 with Hotaka Yamashita and Yoshiki Mizuno, who had known each other since they were six years old, and was joined by vocalist Kiyoe Yoshioka in November of the same year. The group's name is a reference to ikimono-gakari (いきものがかり), a group of children who are responsible for looking after plants and animals in Japanese elementary schools.

In 2006, the group released its first single on Sony Music Entertainment Japan's Epic Records label. Several of their albums have reached number one on the Oricon weekly rankings, and their songs have been featured on various media: from TV commercials, anime shows such as Naruto Shippuden, Japanese TV Dramas such as Women Won't Allow This (「女はそれを許さない」, "Onna wa Sore o Yurusanai"), live action movies such as Time Traveller: The Girl Who Leapt Through Time (2010) (『映画：時をかける少女』 （2010年）, "Eiga: Toki o Kakeru Shōjo (2010)"), the 2012 Olympic broadcast theme song for NHK, and the set piece for a national junior high music competition.

Their official fan club is named Ikimonogakari Fan Class 1-2 (いきものがかりファンクラス1年2組, , "Ikimonogakari Fan Kurasu 1-nen 2-kumi")

== History ==
=== Formation and trials, 1999–2003 ===
In 1989, Mizuno and Yamashita met by chance while they were in the first grade; they were both put in charge of being Ikimonogakari (いきものがかり), who are caretakers of the school's plants and animals. Yamashita later noted that he really wanted to be a "blackboard monitor". Yamashita and Mizuno formed their band on February 1, 1999, and began performing live on the street; not taking it too seriously, they named it "ikimono-gakari" after their shared experience in first grade. At first, they did covers of Masayoshi Yamazaki. On November 3, 1999, Yoshioka joined the band. In those days, Mizuno and Yamashita planned to make a group with a female lead vocalist, which would be an unusual sound for the street performances they were doing. Yoshioka was the younger sister of one of their classmates; she entered as the main singer and the band took on its present-day form. As they were then performing with three members, the band did a cover of Yuzu's single, "Natsuiro" (夏色, "The Colors of Summer").

In September 2000, they suspended the band to focus on college entrance examinations for Yamashita and Mizuno. By March 2003, Yoshioka recovered from a slump where she had almost thought of not singing anymore; she saw this as a second chance to grow as a person. Again, the band re-formed, but then, they were performing with the intent of supporting their increasing fame. As their style of music was moving more towards an acoustic focus, they planned to expand their scope to cover not only street performances but live house concerts as well. Moreover, they made a greater effort to compose more original music and rely less on covers.

=== Rise to fame, 2003–2008 ===
In April 2003, the band resumed playing with a street show in front of the Hon-Atsugi Station on the Odakyū Odawara Line. In June, they did a one-band show at the Thunder Snake Atsugi live venue for the first time. A person who happened to be attending this performance ended up becoming their manager; this became the impetus for them to launch a major road tour. On August 25, they released their first indie album, Makoto ni Senetsu Nagara First Album wo Koshirae Mashita.... On March 26, 2005, the band held a show in the small hall at the Atsugi City Culture Building (Atsugishi Bunka Kaikan); this was the first time the band had ever done a single-band show in a hall.

On March 15, 2006, the band released their first single, SAKURA, produced by Masanori Shimada. This was their major label debut with Epic Records Japan of Sony. Their second single "Hanabi" was released on May 31, 2006, earning the band their first appearance on the Oricon top 10 chart with a number 5 debut. Between November 10 and 30, they held their first live tour, called "Ikimonogakari no Minna-san, Konni-Tour! 2006". They released their first full-length studio album on March 7, 2007, entitled Sakura Saku Machi Monogatari, debuting at number 4 on the Oricon weekly album charts. Between May 24 to June 14, they went on a live tour to support this album. Their second major studio album, Life Album, came out on February 13, 2008, debuting at number 2 on the Oricon weekly album charts. This album's live tour was from March 30 to May 23. On July 7, they came out with their tenth single, "Bluebird", which also became an opening song for the Naruto Shippuden anime, and the group's first to crack the Top 3 in Oricon Singles. On December 24, they released their third studio album, My Song Your Song. This album topped the Oricon weekly charts, becoming their first work to achieve a first ranking on any chart. On December 31, they debuted in the 59th NHK Kōhaku Uta Gassen festival which gave them considerable national exposure.

The 2007 Japanese dub of the 2006 American animated film Monster House has "Seishun no Tobira" by the band in the end credits.

=== Recognition and ongoing success, 2009–2017 ===
On March 4, 2009, their first-ever collection of video works, "Tottemo Ēzō", was released. That year, Mizuno was put in charge of writing the song "Yell" as the set piece for the junior high division of the 76th annual NHK Nationwide School Music Contest. Their 15th single "Yell / Joyful" came out September 23, taking the No. 1 single spot for the Oricon daily charts and the number 2 spot for the weekly chart, the highest rankings so far for any of their singles. The band won one of the Gold Artist awards at the 2009 Best Hit Song Festival (November 26), their first time winning one of the show's prizes. They followed that up with their fourth studio album Hajimari no Uta, released on December 23, and debuting as the number 1 album on the Oricon weekly charts. On New Year's Eve, the band appeared again in the 60th NHK Kōhaku Uta Gassen festival. On June 9, 2012, Japanese television network NHK announced that the theme song for its Olympic broadcasts would be performed by Ikimonogakari. The song was titled "Kaze ga fuiteiru" (Wind is blowing). The three members wrote the song and said that its lyrics would hopefully encourage Japan's athletes like a strong wind. During the Olympics, the band made live appearances in Great Britain on NHK. On March 15, 2016, the day of their 10th anniversary, they released a new album, "Cho-Ikimonogakari~Temnenkinen Members' Best Selection~" and got the number one in music chart.

On January 5, 2017, Ikimonogakari announced an end to its group activities, referring to the forthcoming time as a "grazing period", aiming to extend the possibilities of each member at their own pace for refreshment. It was also referred to as an indefinite hiatus, leaving scope for a future return.

=== Resumption of activities, 2018–2021 ===
After a period of rest from group activities during which members were able to pursue individual goals, the group announced a resumption of their activities, including a tour planned for early 2019. The official resumption of music activity was taken to commence from November 3, 2018, on the 19th anniversary of their original foundation. The 2019 tour took the group to eleven venues across Japan from March to May 2019, and was available only to fan club members, the first such tour in eight years. The tour was followed by various television and music festival appearances. The group's hiatus did nothing to reduce their popularity, as an annual ranking by a prominent entertainment magazine showed them placed at the 12th rank among popular Japanese music acts for 2019. A plan for a 20th anniversary hall tour commemorating the 8th original album We Do and arena tour was cancelled due to the COVID-19 pandemic. In early 2021, Ikimonogakari released their ninth studio album WHO? The track "Baku" from the album is used as the 8th opening theme of the anime series Boruto: Naruto Next Generations. In June 2021, it was announced that Hotaka Yamashita was leaving the band which would continue as a duo.

=== Working as a duo, 2021–present ===
In 2023, they performed the ending theme to Pretty Cure All Stars F, "Ureshikute" (うれしくて, "I'm Very Happy"). They also performed the opening theme for Power of Hope: PreCure Full Bloom, "Tokimeki" (ときめき, Excitement). The duo released their 10th studio album 〇 (Maru) in 2023. In early 2024, the duo released their collaboration album "Ikimonogakari meets" as well as going on a national hall tour. On November 2, 2024, the duo performed a one-day show at Nippon Budokan celebrating the duo's 25th anniversary in a style of just the duo playing like a street live. The new song "Aitai" was performed and go on streaming the same day. They announced their 11th original album Asobi, referring as the new beginning for Ikimonogakari as a duo.

== Members ==
=== Current members ===
==== Kiyoe Yoshioka ====
Kiyoe Yoshioka (吉岡 聖恵, Yoshioka Kiyoe; born February 29, 1984) sings vocals. The daughter of farmers, she was born in the city of Shizuoka, and later moved to Atsugi, Kanagawa when she was five years old. She went to City Minami Mouri Atsugi for primary school, Ebina high school in Kanagawa Prefecture, and graduated from Showa University College of Music. Her brother was a high school classmate of Mizuno and Yamashita. She became one of the hosts of All Night Nippon from 2009 to 2010. She debuted in a voice role as Eevee in the animated movie Pokémon the Movie: Genesect and the Legend Awakened, in which their song "Egao" was featured as an ending theme. She has contributed lyrics and music to some of their songs like Kimi ga Iru and GOLDEN GIRL, which are A-side songs, "Mirai Wakusei" (from "Hajimari no Uta" album), Tokyo (from I album), and Shiroi Diary (from NEWTRAL album).

Following the release of her first solo single in April 2018, Yoshioka released her first solo album Utairo (うたいろ) in October the same year. In September 2018 it was announced that she would be singing "World in Union", the official song for the 2019 Rugby World Cup, being held in Japan. As the Rugby World Cup commenced in Japan, Yoshioka's performance of the song led to international recognition.

On August 1, 2020, it was announced that Kiyoe Yoshioka, had married a man who has no connection with the media industry.

==== Yoshiki Mizuno (composer) ====
Yoshiki Mizuno (水野 良樹, Mizuno Yoshiki; born December 17, 1982) plays guitar and piano. He was born in Hamamatsu, Shizuoka Prefecture, but he later moved to the city Ebina, Kanagawa Prefecture, at an early age. Education: Junior High School Otani Sugikubo in Ebina; Atsugi Prefectural High School in Ebina, Kanagawa. After he dropped out of Economics, Politics in Meiji University, he graduated from the Department of Sociology in Hitotsubashi University. It was announced that he registered his marriage on August 17, 2013, to a woman who has no connection to the media industry. He has released no further information about her identity.

=== Former members ===
==== Hotaka Yamashita ====
Hotaka Yamashita (山下 穂尊, Yamashita Hotaka; born August 27, 1982) played guitar and harmonica. He also played the piano, which he had learned to do from his third grade in elementary school. He was born in Ebina City, Kanagawa Prefecture. He studied at Ebina Municipal Otani Junior High School and Kanagawa Prefectural Atsugi High School, and also attended Hosei University in its Department of Sociology

Yamashita left the group and retired from the entertainment industry after their June 10–11, 2021 performance at Yokohama Arena.

=== Supporting musicians ===
- Takashi Adachi – bass guitar
- Akimitsu Honma – keyboard
- Naoki Hayashibe – guitar
- Tomu Tamada – drums

== Discography ==
Studio albums

- 2007: Sakura Saku Machi Monogatari
- 2008: Life Album
- 2008: My Song Your Song
- 2009: Hajimari no Uta
- 2012: Newtral
- 2013: I
- 2014: Fun! Fun! Fanfare!
- 2019: We Do
- 2021: Who?
- 2023: "〇" (Maru)
- 2025: Asobi

Compilation albums

- 2010: Ikimonobakari: Members Best Selection
- 2012: Barādon
- 2016: Chō Ikimonobakari: Ten-nen Kinen Members Best Selection

Collaboration album

- 2024: Ikimonogakari Meets
- 2026: Ikimonogakari Meets 2

== Awards and nominations ==
=== Japan Record Awards ===
The Japan Record Awards is a major music awards show held annually in Japan by the Japan Composer's Association.

Year	Nominee / work	Award	Result
2010	Hajimari no Uta	Best Album Award	Won
