= Gannibal season 1 =

Gannibal
- Season 1
- Starring: Yuya Yagira; Riho Yoshioka; Show Kasamatsu
- No. of episodes: 7

Release
- Original network: Disney+ (international); Hulu (United States)
- Original release: December 28, 2022 – February 1, 2023

Season chronology
- Next → 2025

The first season of the Japanese folk horror television series Gannibal was created for television by Shinzo Katayama, based on the horror manga of the same name. The season stars Yuya Yagira, Riho Yoshioka and Show Kasamatsu. It premiered on December 28, 2022, via Disney+ and Hulu and concluded on February 1, 2023, with a total of seven episodes.

== Cast and characters ==
Lead cast

- Yuya Yagira as Daigo Agawa
- Riho Yoshioka as Yuki Agawa
- Show Kasamatsu as Keisuke Goto

Supporting cast

- Rairu Sugita as Yosuke Goto
- Kokone Shimizu as Mashiro Agawa
- Takato Yonemoto as Makoto Goto
- Yûtarô Nakamura as Ryuji Goto
- Hirota Ôtsuka as Taichi Goto / Yoji Goto
- Mitsuo Yoshihara as Iwao Goto
- Yoshi Sakô as Mutsuo Goto
- Kana Kita as Sumire Kano
- Yûya Matsuura as Jin
- Kazuki Sawai as Shirogane Goto / That Person
- Takato Nagata as Kunitoshi Nishimura
- Shôji Ômiya as Kou Goto
- Ryubun Sumori
- Umi Umiguchi
- Riku Okabe
- Kei Kagaya
- Naoki Hayashida
- Motoko Nakano as Goto family member
- Chie Kuriyama
- Yoko Yano as Toki Kijima
- Mayumi Sakura
- Toshimine Kido
- Reina Nakamura
- Himaru Ikeshita
- Toshihiro Yashiba as Osamu Kano
- Seiji Rokkaku as Kiyoshi Goto
- Baijaku Nakamura as Sabu Yamaguchi
- Mahiro Takasugi as Kyosuke Terayama
- Rio Yamashita as Kanako Yamaguchi
- Takeo Gozu as Keizo Goto
- Yukari Ando
- Sowa Omine
- Shigemitsu Ogi as Nakamura
- Takeru Yokoi
- Ao Tsuboi
- Gō Rijū as Morobe Police Department Head
- Mitsuko Baisho as Gin Goto
- Shunsuke Tanaka as Munechika Kamiyama
- Hajime Inoue as Yamabushi
- Masanobu Yada
- Yûji Yoshimasu
- Satoshi Nikaido as Utada
- Akihiro Yamamoto
- Kanata Ichino
- Reiko Kataoka as Osamu Kano's wife
- Aoba Kawai as Ai Goto

Guest cast

- Yûgo Mikawa as Tsubasa Konno
- Kuu Izima as Takayanagi
- Misa Wada
- Masayasu Kitayama
- Akira Takeuchi
- Kôji Seki
- Yasuo Sugimoto
- Rina Ogawa
- Satomi Yagihashi
- Kosei Kudo
- Akinori Andô
- Daisuke Matsunaga
- Tatsuya Shirato
- Ryô Yoshida as Fake detective
- Makoto Tomita
- Masaaki Akahori as Kanemura

== Episodes ==
No. overall	No. in season	Title	Directed by	Written by	Original release date
1	1	"Offering of Flowers"	Shinzo Katayama	Takamasa Oe	December 28, 2022
Police officer Daigo Agawa transfers to a new post in the remote village of Kuge with his wife Yuki and daughter Mashiro. Upon meeting members of the Goto clan, he comes across an old woman's dead body. The family says she was attacked by a bear, but Daigo notices human bite mark in her wrist.
2	2	"Attack"	Shinzo Katayama	Takamasa Oe	December 28, 2022
Daigo and his family comes across the funeral of Gin Goto. Keisuke Goto, the next head of the Gotos, realizes that there is an intruder amongst them.
3	3	"Fatal Bullet"	Shinzo Katayama	Takamasa Oe	January 4, 2023
4	4	"Line of Sight"	Shinzo Katayama	Takamasa Oe	January 11, 2023
5	5	"Trace"	Shinzo Katayama	Takamasa Oe	January 18, 2023
6	6	"Premonition"	Shinzo Katayama	Takamasa Oe	January 25, 2023
7	7	"Promise"	Shinzo Katayama	Takamasa Oe	February 1, 2023
