= 44th Yokohama Film Festival =

2023 film festival in Yokohama, Japan

- Location: Yokohama, Kanagawa, Japan
- Founded: 1980
- Festival date: 5 February 2023

The 44th Yokohama Film Festival (第44回ヨコハマ映画祭) was held on 5 February 2023.

== Awards ==
- Best Film: - Love Is Light
- Best Director: Keiichi Kobayashi - Love Is Light
- Yoshimitsu Morita Memorial Best New Director: Chie Hayakawa - Plan 75
- Best Screenplay: Kōsuke Mukai - A Man
- Best Cinematographer: Ryūto Kondō - A Man
- Best Actress:
  - Chieko Baisho - Plan 75
  - Riho Yoshioka - Anime Supremacy!, Shimamori Tower
- Best Actor: Kōji Seto - Love Nonetheless
- Best Supporting Actress: Yuumi Kawai - A Man, Plan 75, Love Nonetheless, A Winter Rose, Just Remembering
- Best Supporting Actor:
  - Hayato Isomura - The Fish Tale, Plan 75, Offbeat Cops, Prior Convictions
  - Tasuku Emoto - Anime Supremacy!, No Place to Go, Riverside Mukolitta
- Best Newcomer:
  - Nanase Nishino - Love Is Light
  - Fūju Kamio - Love Is Light
  - Yuna Taira - Love Is Light
  - Fumika Baba - Love Is Light
- Examiner Special Award: The staff and cast of Anime Supremacy!

== Top 10 ==
No.	Title
1	Love Is Light
2	A Man
3	Anime Supremacy!
4	Wheel of Fortune and Fantasy
5	The Fish Tale
6	Missing
7	Plan 75
8	The Lines That Define Me
9	Love Nonetheless
9	A Winter Rose
Runner-up: No Place to Go
