= 47th Yokohama Film Festival =

2026 film festival in Yokohama, Japan

- Location: Yokohama, Kanagawa, Japan
- Founded: 1980
- Festival date: 1 February 2026

The 47th Yokohama Film Festival (第47回ヨコハマ映画祭) was held on 1 February 2026. The awards were announced on 7 December 2025.

== Awards ==
- Best Film: - Kokuho
- Best Director: Lee Sang-il - Kokuho
- Yoshimitsu Morita Memorial Best New Director: Yuiga Danzuka - Brand New Landscape
- Best Screenplay: Satoko Okudera - Kokuho
- Best Cinematographer: Yuta Tsukinaga - Two Seasons, Two Strangers, On Summer Sand, Seaside Serendipity
- Best Actress: Suzu Hirose - A Pale View of Hills, Yasuko, Songs of Days Past
- Best Actor:
  - Ryo Yoshizawa - Kokuho
  - Ryusei Yokohama - Faceless
- Best Supporting Actress:
  - Yuumi Kawai - She Taught Me Serendipity, Two Seasons, Two Strangers, A Bad Summer, Renoir
  - Aoi Ito - She Taught Me Serendipity
- Best Supporting Actor: Min Tanaka - Kokuho
- Best Newcomer:
  - Kodao Kurosaki - Brand New Landscape, She Taught Me Serendipity
  - Mansaku Takada - Two Seasons, Two Strangers, Dawn Chorus
  - Yuta Hayashi - Baka's Identity, Can't Cry with Your Face
- Examiner Special Award: Nakamura Ganjirō IV - Kokuho
- Special Grand Prize: Yohei Taneda - Kokuho

== Top 10 ==
No.	Title
1	Kokuho
2	Two Seasons, Two Strangers
3	Teki Cometh
4	Hero's Island
5	A Pale View of Hills
6	Suzuki=Bakudan
7	Frontline: Yokohama Bay
8	She Taught Me Serendipity
9	Sunset Sunrise
10	Faceless
Runner-up: Lust in the Rain
