= 46th Japan Academy Film Prize =

Japanese film awards in 2023

- Date: March 10, 2023
- Site: Grand Prince Hotel New Takanawa, Tokyo, Japan
- Hosted by: Shinichi Hatori; Kasumi Arimura

Highlights
- Most awards: A Man (8)
- Most nominations: A Man (13)

The 46th Japan Academy Film Prize (第46回日本アカデミー賞) is the 46th edition of the Japan Academy Film Prize, an award presented by the Nippon Academy-Sho Association to award excellence in filmmaking.

== Winners and nominees ==
=== Awards ===
Best Film	Best Animation Film
A Man; Shin Ultraman; Phases of the Moon; Anime Supremacy!; Wandering	The First Slam Dunk; Inu-Oh; Lonely Castle in the Mirror; Suzume; One Piece Film: Red
Best Director	Best Screenplay
Kei Ishikawa – A Man; Takashi Koizumi – The Pass: Last Days of the Samurai; Shinji Higuchi – Shin Ultraman; Ryūichi Hiroki – Phases of the Moon; Kōhei Yoshino – Anime Supremacy!	Kōsuke Mukai – A Man; Takashi Koizumi – The Pass: Last Days of the Samurai; Hiroshi Hashimoto – Phases of the Moon; Chie Hayakawa – Plan 75; Yōsuke Masaike – Anime Supremacy!
Best Actor	Best Actress
Satoshi Tsumabuki – A Man; Sadao Abe – Lesson in Murder; Yo Oizumi – Phases of the Moon; Kazunari Ninomiya – Fragments of the Last Will; Tori Matsuzaka – Wandering	Yukino Kishii – Small, Slow But Steady; Non – The Fish Tale; Chieko Baisho – Plan 75; Suzu Hirose – Wandering; Riho Yoshioka – Anime Supremacy!
Best Supporting Actor	Best Supporting Actress
Masataka Kubota – A Man; Tasuku Emoto – Anime Supremacy!; Kentaro Sakaguchi – Hell Dogs; Ren Meguro – Phases of the Moon; Ryusei Yokohama – Wandering	Sakura Ando – A Man; Kasumi Arimura – Phases of the Moon; Machiko Ono – Anime Supremacy!; Nana Seino – A Man; Nana Seino – Kingdom 2: Far and Away; Mei Nagano – Motherhood; Honoka Matsumoto – It's in the Woods
Best Music	Best Cinematography
Radwimps / Kazuma Jin'nouchi – Suzume; Yoshihiro Ike – Anime Supremacy!; Yū Takami – Whisper of the Heart; Cicada – A Man; Mari Fukushige – Phases of the Moon	Osamu Ichikawa / Keizō Suzuki – Shin Ultraman; Masaharu Ueda / Hiroyuki Kitazawa – The Pass: Last Days of the Samurai; Ryūto Kondō – A Man; Akira Sakō – Kingdom 2: Far and Away; Hong Kyung-pyo – Wandering
Best Lighting Direction	Best Art Direction
Sōsuke Yoshikado – Shin Ultraman; Hideaki Yamakawa – The Pass: Last Days of the Samurai; Kenjirō Sō – A Man; Hiroyuki Kase – Kingdom 2: Far and Away; Yūki Nakamura – Wandering	Yūji Hayashida – Shin Ultraman; Toshihiro Isomi / Emiko Tsuyuki – Fragments of the Last Will; Hidetaka Ozawa – Kingdom 2: Far and Away; Satoshi Kanda – Anime Supremacy!; Eri Sakushima – A Man
Best Sound Recording	Best Film Editing
Takeshi Ogawa – A Man; Hironobu Tanaka / Haru Yamada – Shin Ultraman; Akira Fukada – Phases of the Moon; Masahito Yano – The Pass: Last Days of the Samurai; Kazushiko Yokono – Kingdom 2: Far and Away	Kei Ishikawa – A Man; Hideto Aga – The Pass: Last Days of the Samurai; Sōichi Ueno – Anime Supremacy!; Yōhei Kurihara / Hideaki Anno – Shin Ultraman; Minoru Nomoto – Phases of the Moon
Best Foreign Language Film	Newcomer of the Year
Top Gun: Maverick; Avatar: The Way of Water; CODA; Spider-Man: No Way Home; RRR	Karin Ono – Anime Supremacy!; Hinako Kikuchi – Phases of the Moon; Riko Fukumoto – Even If This Love Disappears From the World Tonight; Meru Nukumi – My Boyfriend in Orange; Daiki Arioka – Shin Ultraman; Ichiro Banka – Sabakan; Hokuto Matsumura – xxxHolic; Ren Meguro – Phases of the Moon
Special Award	Award for Distinguished Service from the Chairman
One Piece Film: Red music team	Shunya Itō; Yūzō Kayama; Hideki Mochizuki
Special Award from the Association	Special Award from the Chairman
Masanobu Amemiya; Shōhei Kawamoto; Naomi Koike; Yasuhiro Fukuoka	Hideo Onchi; Hiro'o Matsuda; Mitsunobu Kawamura; Iwao Ishii; Kazuki Ōmori; Yoichi Sai
