= Anime Supremacy! =

Japanese novel

- Cover of English edition

ハケンアニメ! (Haken Anime!)
- Created by: Mizuki Tsujimura
- Novel
- Written by: Mizuki Tsujimura
- Illustrated by: CLAMP
- Published by: Magazine House
- English publisher: NA: Vertical
- Published: August 22, 2014
- Novel

Anime Legend!
- Written by: Mizuki Tsujimura
- Illustrated by: CLAMP
- Published by: Magazine House
- Published: March 3, 2022
- Live-action film
- Anime Supremacy! (2022)

Anime Supremacy! (ハケンアニメ!, Haken Anime!) is a Japanese novel by Mizuki Tsujimura with illustrations by CLAMP. A stage play adaptation was performed from October to November 2019, and a live-action film adaptation premiered on May 20, 2022.

== Plot ==
Anime Supremacy! tells the stories of three women working different roles in the anime industry: a producer, a director and an animator. Through the course of the story, the women experience the challenges that crop up when creating an anime series as they aim for the title of 'Supremacy' – a term given to the very best anime that season, either in sales or from the buzz surrounding it.

== Media ==
=== Novel ===
The novel, written by Mizuki Tsujimura and illustrated by CLAMP, was first published by Magazine House on August 22, 2014. An English-language translation of the novel was published by Vertical on October 3, 2017.

A spin-off novel, titled Anime Legend! (レジェンドアニメ!, Rejendoanime!) was published on March 3, 2022.

=== Stage play ===
A stage play adaptation was performed at Cool Japan Park Osaka and Kinokuniya Hall from October to November 2019, written and directed by G2 and produced by Yoshimoto Kogyo.

=== Live-action film ===
Toei announced a live-action film adaptation of the novel in November 2021 with posters, film trailer, and trailers of two in-story anime films, Soundback: Kanade no Ishi, directed by Azuma Tani with character designs by Eisaku Kubonouchi, and Unmei Sensen Liddell-Light, directed by Takashi Otsuka with character designs by Takahiro Kishida. The film stars Riho Yoshioka, Tomoya Nakamura, Tasuku Emoto, and Machiko Ono. It is filmed at Toei Tokyo Film Studio and premiered in theaters on May 20, 2022.
