= Gannibal (manga) =

Japanese manga series

- Cover of the first volume

ガンニバル (Gan'nibaru)
- Genre: Suspense
- Manga
- Written by: Masaaki Ninomiya
- Published by: Nihon Bungeisha
- English publisher: NA: Ablaze Publishing
- Magazine: Weekly Manga Goraku
- Original run: October 5, 2018 – November 26, 2021
- Volumes: 13
- Television drama
- Directed by: Shinzo Katayama
- Produced by: Teruhisa Yamamoto; Tatsuya Iwakura
- Written by: Takamasa Oe
- Studio: Starduct Pictures
- Licensed by: Disney Platform Distribution
- Original network: Disney+
- Original run: December 28, 2022 – April 23, 2025
- Episodes: 15

Gannibal (Japanese: ガンニバル, Hepburn: Gan'nibaru) is a Japanese manga series written and illustrated by Masaaki Ninomiya. It was serialized in Nihon Bungeisha's Weekly Manga Goraku magazine from October 2018 to November 2021 and published in thirteen volumes. It tells the story of police officer Daigo, who transfers to a remote village and faces hostility from the locals while investigating a mysterious death, leading him to uncover dark secrets and rumors of cannibalism.

The manga was adapted into a Japanese TV series with the same name. Its first season premiered in December 2022. The second season premiered in March 2025.

== Media ==
=== Manga ===
Written and illustrated by Masaaki Ninomiya, the series was serialized in Nihon Bungeisha's Weekly Manga Goraku magazine from October 5, 2018, to November 26, 2021. Its individual chapters were collected into thirteen tankōbon volumes. A special chapter was released in Weekly Manga Goraku on December 16, 2022, to commemorate the premiere of the drama adaptation.

In July 2023, Ablaze Publishing announced that they licensed the series for English publication.

==== Volume list ====
No.	Original release date	Original ISBN	English release date	English ISBN
1	February 18, 2019	978-4-53-713881-8	November 28, 2023	978-1-68-497219-7
2	May 20, 2019	978-4-53-713924-2	February 27, 2024	978-1-68-497220-3
3	August 19, 2019	978-4-53-713969-3	December 24, 2024	—
4	November 18, 2019	978-4-53-714174-0	June 10, 2025	—
5	January 29, 2020	978-4-53-714195-5	September 9, 2025	—
6	April 20, 2020	978-4-53-714233-4	December 9, 2025	—
7	July 9, 2020	978-4-53-714260-0	—	—
8	October 9, 2020	978-4-53-714292-1	—	—
9	January 9, 2021	978-4-53-714327-0	—	—
10	April 8, 2021	978-4-53-714362-1	—	—
11	July 16, 2021	978-4-53-714388-1	—	—
12	November 18, 2021	978-4-53-714434-5	—	—
13	February 28, 2022	978-4-53-714465-9	—	—

=== Drama ===
A Japanese television drama adaptation was announced by Disney+ during their "APAC Content Showcase" on October 14, 2021. It was directed by Shinzo Katayama, with Takamasa Oe writing the scripts and Teruhisa Yamamoto and Tatsuya Iwakura producing. Yuya Yagira, Riho Yoshioka, and Show Kasamatsu played the lead roles. It premiered on Disney+ on December 28, 2022. Internationally, the series was streamed by Hulu in the United States and Disney+ in the rest of the world.

On September 21, 2023, a second season was announced.

== Reception ==
The tenth volume was selected to be in competition at the 2023 Angoulême International Comics Festival. The series has two million copies in circulation.
