= Ayumu Nakajima =

Japanese actor (born 1988)

- 中島歩
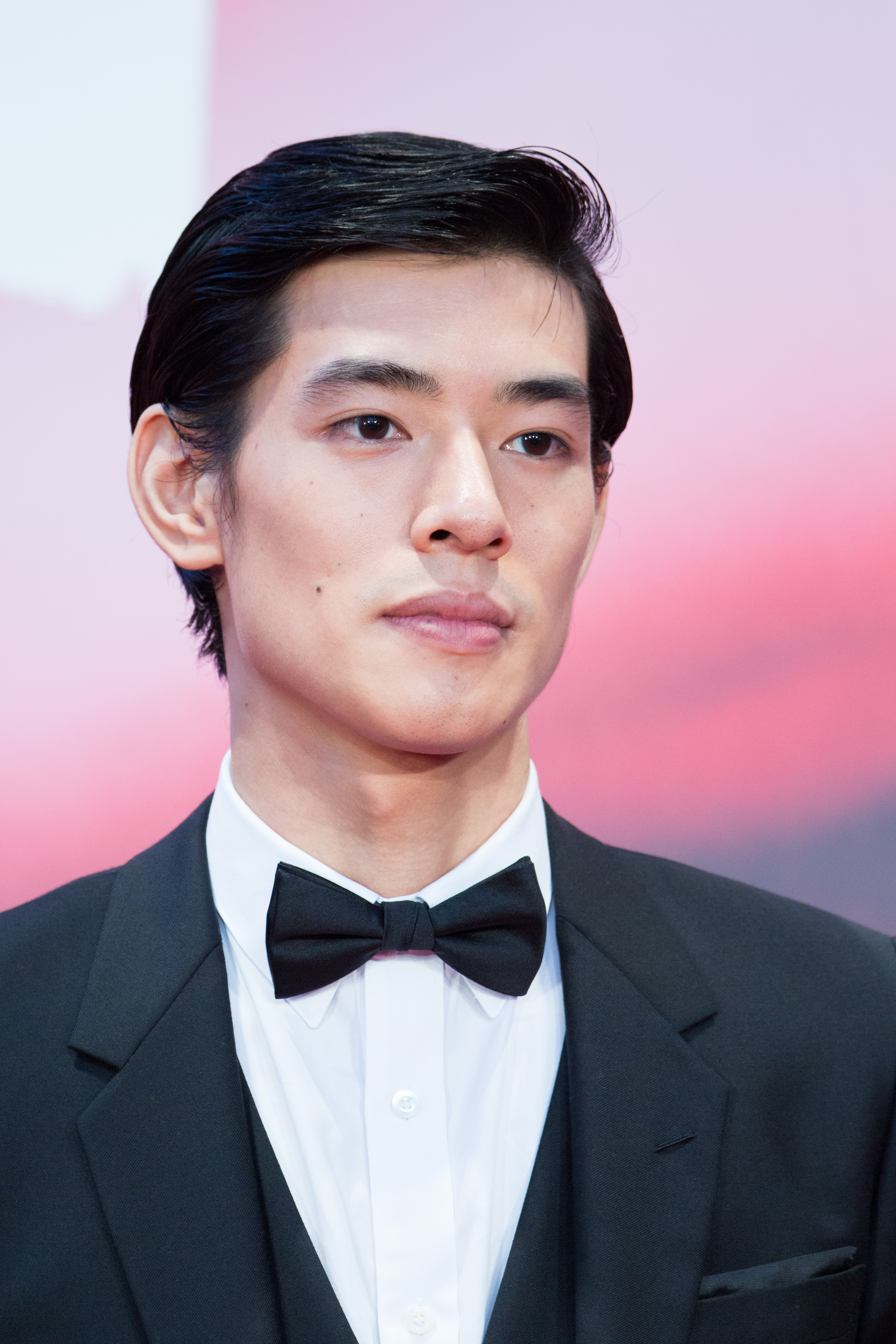
- Nakajima at the 30th Tokyo International Film Festival in 2017
- Born: October 7, 1988 (age 38); Miyagi Prefecture, Japan
- Education: Nihon University
- Occupation: Actor
- Years active: 2013–present
- Agent: Ten Carat
- Notable work: Saturday Fiction as Kajiwara; Wheel of Fortune and Fantasy as Kazuaki; Anita as Goto Yuki
- Relatives: Kunikida Doppo (great-great-grandfather)

Ayumu Nakajima (中島歩, Nakajima Ayumu; born October 7, 1988 in Tokyo) is a Japanese actor.

== Early life ==
Ayumu Nakajima was born on October 7, 1988, in Miyagi Prefecture, Japan, but he grew up in Tokyo. Nakajima's great-great-grandfather was Kunikida Doppo. Nakajima went to Koishikawa High School and later got a degree in literature from Nihon University. Back in high school, he played football, and during his university days, he was part of a rakugo study group.

== Career ==
Nakajima started modeling since he was still in college, but his real dream was to become an actor. During his modeling days, he was represented by Gig Management. He quit modeling in January 2012 and started auditioning for roles while working part-time jobs. He made his acting debut on stage in April 2013. In 2015, he played Jun'ichi Amamiya in a stage adaptation of The Black Lizard alongside Akihiro Miwa.

In 2014, Ayumu Nakajima landed his first regular TV role in the series Hanako and Anne, where he played Ryūichi Miyamoto. He snagged the Best New Actor award at the 7th Tama Film Awards.

In 2019, he made his first appearance in an international film with Saturday Fiction, which was selected for the competition section of the 76th Venice International Film Festival. Fast forward to 2021, the film he starred in, Wheel of Fortune and Fantasy, won the Silver Bear at the 71st Berlin International Film Festival.

From November 2021, he appeared in the Hong Kong film Anita, a biographical film about Anita Mui, which was released mainly across Asia (though it did not hit theaters in Japan, the Director's Cut version started streaming on Disney+ in Japan from April 2022). In 2022, he won the Best Supporting Actor award at the 35th Takasaki Film Festival for his roles in Wheel of Fortune and Fantasy.

== Filmography ==
=== Film ===
Year	Title	Role	Notes	Ref.
2013	Zentai			
2013	Mame Daifuku Monogatari			
2015	Good Stripes	Masao Minamisawa	Lead role	
2017	Koi no Kitan-shu			
2017	It Girls: Anytime Smokin' Cigarette			
2018	Dynamite Grafitti	Nakazaki		
2018	The Negotiator	Masayuki Kuramochi		
2019	Just Only Love	Kanbayashi		
2019	Saturday Fiction	Ohara		
2020	Korogaru Bidama	Hishikawa		
2020	Gone Wednesday	Araki		
2021	Asakusa Kid	Inoue		
2021	Wheel of Fortune and Fantasy	Kazuaki	Lead role	
2021	Anita	Goto Yuki		
2021	Ito	Kudo Yuichiro		
2022	Love Nonetheless	Ryosuke Wakata		
2022	A Far Shore	Club owner		
2022	The Nighthawk's First Love	Tobisaka Shota		
2022	How to Find Happiness	Toshihide's brother		
2022	Take a Stroll	Inada Hidekazu		
2023	Twilight Cinema Blues	Watanabe Kensuke		
2024	The Parades	Hiroshi Sasaki		
2024	Silent Love	Kodō		
2024	Happyend	Okada		
2025	Teki Cometh			
2025	Renoir	Toru Omaezaki		
2025	Yoyogi Johnny			
2025	Jinsei	Kuzu (voice)		
2025	Sato and Sato	Akira Shoji		
2026	Zakken!: The Cosmos Beneath Our Feet	Fukuzawa		
2026	Sheep in the Box	Engineer		
2026	Two Cigarettes, Three Nights	Shinji		
2027	Traveling Practice	Keisuke	Lead role	
2027	Kasuka na Kare o Dakishimete	Kosuke Hayashi		
2027	The Blue We Touch	Fujino		

=== Television ===
Year	Title	Role	Notes	Ref.
2014	Hanako and Anne	Ryuichi Miyamoto	Asadora	
2024	Extremely Inappropriate!	Yasumori		
2025	Gannibal Season 2	Osamu Gotō		
2025	Anpan	Jiro Wakamatsu	Asadora	
2025	Last Samurai Standing	Nagase Shinpei		
2026	Extremely Inappropriate! Special	Yasumori	Television film	
2026	Brothers in Arms	Azai Nagamasa	Taiga drama	
2026	Straight to Hell	Yutaka Sudo		
2026	Human Vapor	Obata (young)		
2026	Until the T-shirt Dries	Itsuki		
