= Asakusa Kid =

- Poster

Japanese name
- Kanji: 浅草キッド
Transcriptions
- Revised Hepburn: Akakusa Kiddo
- Directed by: Gekidan Hitori
- Written by: Gekidan Hitori
- Based on: "Asakusa Kid" by Takeshi Kitano
- Starring: Yo Oizumi; Yuya Yagira
- Cinematography: Fūta Takagi
- Edited by: Junnosuke Hogaki
- Music by: Takashi Ohmama
- Production companies: Django Film; Nikkatsu
- Distributed by: Netflix
- Release date: December 9, 2021
- Running time: 122 minutes
- Country: Japan
- Language: Japanese

Asakusa Kid (Japanese: 浅草キッド, Hepburn: Asakusa kiddo) is a 2021 Japanese film written and directed by Gekidan Hitori and starring Yo Oizumi and Yuya Yagira. It is a biopic based on the apprenticeship of Takeshi Kitano by Senzaburo Fukami, and adapted from Kitano's 1988 memoir of the same name.

== Cast ==
- Yo Oizumi as Senzaburo Fukami
- Yuya Yagira as Takeshi Kitano (Beat Takeshi)
- Mugi Kadowaki as Chiharu
- Nobuyuki Tsuchiya as Beat Kiyoshi
- Ayumu Nakajima
- Yūsuke Furusawa
- Nana Komaki
- Yōko Ōshima
- Hiroyuki Onoue as Hachiro Azuma
- Morio Kazama as Jun Tayama
- Honami Suzuki as Mari Fukami
