= Rangoon (2017 Hindi film) =

2017 Indian film by Vishal Bhardwaj

- Theatrical release poster
- Directed by: Vishal Bhardwaj
- Written by: Matthew Robbins; Vishal Bhardwaj; Sabrina Dhawan
- Produced by: Sajid Nadiadwala; Vishal Bhardwaj; Viacom 18 Motion Pictures
- Starring: Saif Ali Khan; Shahid Kapoor; Kangana Ranaut
- Cinematography: Pankaj Kumar
- Edited by: Aalaap Majgavkar
- Music by: Vishal Bhardwaj
- Production companies: Viacom18 Motion Pictures; Nadiadwala Grandson Entertainment; VB Pictures
- Distributed by: Viacom 18 Motion Pictures
- Release date: 24 February 2017
- Running time: 154 minutes
- Country: India
- Language: Hindi
- Budget: ₹80 crore
- Box office: est. ₹ 41.04 crore

Rangoon is a 2017 Indian Hindi-language romantic war drama film directed by Vishal Bhardwaj and produced by Sajid Nadiadwala and Viacom 18 Motion Pictures. The project is a period film set during World War II (1939–1945) and stars Kangana Ranaut as a character that is based on Mary Ann Evans aka Fearless Nadia, Bollywood's first original stunt-woman. It stars Saif Ali Khan, Shahid Kapoor, and Kangana Ranaut in lead roles. The film was released on 24 February 2017 on the Mahashivratri weekend.

== Plot ==
In 1943, as the Second World War rages on, India is fighting a war of her own: independence from British rule. Subash Chandra Bose, founder of the Indian National Army (INA), has become disenchanted with Mahatma Gandhi's Ahimsa (non-violent) movement and desires to fight fire with fire. Indian troops in the British Indian Army are locked in pitched battles with both the INA and its Japanese contingent. In one such skirmish close to the Indo-Burma border, Jemadar Nawab Malik and a group of fellow soldiers are cornered by the Japanese infantry. Running to escape on a barge, Nawab is shot and captured as a prisoner of war. Meanwhile, the INA's top brass desperately seeks finances to replenish its heavy ammunition to aid the charge to Delhi.

Simultaneously, in India, Julia, a leading film star, is the star performer in a dance troupe that entertains civilians and armed forces. Zulfi is her butler, makeup man, and trusted confidant. Her films are produced by Rustom "Rusi" Billimoria, a former Indian action film star whose career was cut short when he lost a hand in a film stunt gone wrong. Billimoria is on friendly terms with the resident British commander, Major General David Harding, who encounters a gem-encrusted royal sword belonging to a Maharajah at a gathering hosted by Billimoria. Slighted by the commander's arrogant demeanor, the King endeavours to send the sword to the Indo-Burma border, where the INA hopes it can fund its artillery program and drive the British out of India. An opportunity arises when Harding proposes dispatching Julia and her troupe to the war-torn border, where he hopes to raise the sagging morale of his troops through her shows. When Billimoria and Julia (who are now in a relationship) object, Harding promises top-grade security and coerces them by threatening to block supplies of film stock from England, as Nazi Germany has stopped shipments. Billimoria's affair with Julia causes rifts in his family, with his wife demanding a divorce and his grandfather concocting a ruse to prevent Billimoria accompanying Julia on the tour.

On board the train, Jemadar Malik, who has apparently escaped as a prisoner of war, is assigned as a security detail to Julia, much to her chagrin. Crossing a river, the full complement of passengers and boatmen come under fierce Japanese aerial attack, resulting in numerous casualties. The British assume Julia has fallen, but she has survived and is accosted by three Japanese soldiers. Malik, who has also escaped unscathed, arrives in time to save her from being killed and, in the process, captures one Japanese soldier, Hiromichi, as a hostage to lead them back to the Indian border. Through the rain-drenched jungle and a war zone swarming with enemy platoons, Julia, Malik, and Hiromichi march slowly to their destination. Combing an anti-aircraft bunker, they barely escape a booby trap, with Malik furious at Hiromichi for leading them into an ambush. As Julia's gentleness and compassion counteract Malik's battle-hardened cynicism and aggression, the two fall in love.

Back in India, Harding again proposes that Julia, now engaged to Billimoria, be dispatched to the front lines, with anti-aircraft gun protection this time. Julia continues to exhibit feelings for Malik: she endorses him for the prestigious Victoria Cross medal and deliberately forces him to volunteer for a stage show. Billimoria begins to have suspicions about her behaviour, which are confirmed after one surreptitious and passionate episode between Malik and Julia during an air raid. Desiring vengeance, Billimoria volunteers as a stagehand on Julia's next show and, after a tense routine, indirectly reveals that he is aware of her infidelity and ready to engage in a fight-to-the-finish with Malik. Meanwhile, Zulfi, who has also survived the earlier raid and is in reality a spy for the INA, has been entrusted to take the sword back to the INA by Mema, an INA agent in the British ranks, and Malik. It is then revealed that Malik did not escape his captivity in Rangoon but was freed by the INA, who enlightened him about the evils of British rule in India, thereby enlisting him in the Gandhi regiment of the INA. Convinced of the cause and endowed with a fresh purpose, Malik clandestinely meets Julia before a show and delivers final instructions to Zulfi, who takes up a position outside her tent. Major Williams racially insults Zulfi after trying to forcibly enter Julia's tent to make her begin the show. Infuriated and inebriated, Zulfi hurls derogatory threats to the British on the radio during Julia's show. The outburst is heard by Billimoria, Harding, and other British soldiers, who rush to uncover the offensive culprit. Zulfi pleads guilty in Julia's presence on the stage but is shot dead by Williams, while Harding discovers Zulfi possessed a British Army officer's pistol. Distraught, Julia protests Billimoria's decision to not give Zulfi a proper burial as another member of Julia's troupe covertly abets Malik in a show of weapon check. As night falls amid torrential downpour, Julia and Malik give Zulfi a proper burial, musing over loyalties and motivations.

During an attempt to arrange a rendezvous for transferring the sword with the INA via a letter, Malik and Mema are caught by Julia, who accuses Malik of betrayal. Torn between his feelings for her and his cause, Malik retorts by saying Julia is blinded by what she sees and the truth is lost on her. The letter reaches the INA, but Mema is trapped by the British while relaying messages. The next day, Harding blackmails Mema into revealing her co-conspirators by threatening to kill her son, at which point Malik discloses his true allegiance. Singing the INA anthem, Malik marches up defiantly to Harding, who signals Williams to shoot Mema dead. Enraged, Malik lunges at Williams but is captured and tortured by his former comrades. Horrified at this sequence of events, Julia turns a new leaf: she extracts Malik from a train bound for Delhi and resumes Zulfi's journey in getting the sword to the INA. At the bridge where the sword is to be handed over, Malik and Julia are cornered by the British. Malik convinces Julia to cross the bridge by covering her. In the ensuing gunfight, Malik is seriously injured by mortar fire while Billimoria arrives with British reinforcements. Harding tries to dissuade Julia from crossing the bridge with another false promise, but the mortally wounded Malik defies him by walking across the bridge and sacrifices his own life so that Julia can continue.

Harding orders the bridge be blown up, causing grave injuries to Julia. Seeking to redeem himself, Billimoria asks Julia for her last wish, who appeals that he continue her task of delivering the sword to the INA before falling to her death. Unsheathing the shining sword, Billimoria massacres the rest of the British troops on the bridge, decapitates Harding, and walking on the rope delivers the sword to the INA. The film ends by proclaiming the INA raised the Indian flag in 1944.

== Cast ==
- Saif Ali Khan as Rustom "Rusi" Billimoria
- Shahid Kapoor as Jamadar Nawab Malik
- Kangana Ranaut as Miss Julia
- Shriswara as Haseena
- Kashmira Irani as Zenobia Billimoria
- Richard McCabe as Major General David Harding
- Satoru Kawaguchi as Hiromichi
- Gajraj Rao as Ahuja
- Manav Vij as Bhyro Singh
- Surendra Pal as Maharaja
- Amruta Khanvilkar as Maharani
- Lin Laishram as Mema
- Saharsh Shukla as Zulfi
- Alex Avery as Major Williams
- Nitish Pandey as Patel
- Ujjwal Chopra as Major P.K. Sehgal
- Kuldeep Sareen as Col. Shahnawaz Khan
- Rushad Rana as Hoshang Billimoria
- Pooja Sarup as Bulbul
- Atul Kumar as Chulbul
- Nitant Srivastava as Rusi's manager
- Gerson D'Cunha as Bappawa
- Berzin as Firdaus
- Neel as Cyrus
- Ballu Panchal as Mema's son
- Taku Koging as Mule's man
- Christian Daly as soldier and as dignitary

== Production ==
Vishal Bhardwaj was supposed to shoot the film after Omkara (2006). However, the film was stalled for unknown reasons. It was previously titled Julia. The screenplay was written by Matthew Robbins, who previously collaborated for 7 Khoon Maaf (2011).

The film's shooting began on 18 November 2015 in Arunachal Pradesh. Many artists from Manipur, Arunachal joined the crew for the first shift. In mid January, the film's shooting was halted due to an injury to Shahid Kapoor and a Japanese actor. Kangana Ranaut travelled to New York City to research her role, and then headed to an island in Mexico to learn solo living.

== Release ==
The film was released on 24 February 2017. Upon its release, the film received positive reviews, although Kangana Ranaut's performance as Julia was widely praised as the strength of the film. The film failed to find a wider audience and was one of the biggest flops of 2017. The film is also available on Netflix.

== Reception ==
Upon release, Rangoon received positive reviews from the film critics, with major praise drawn to Ranaut's performance. On the review aggregator website Rotten Tomatoes, the film holds a rating of 55% based on 11 reviews and an average rating of 6.1/10.

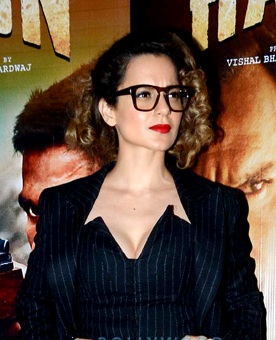
Kangana Ranaut's performance in Rangoon received praise from the film critics.

Taran Adarsh of Bollywood Hungama gave the film a rating of 4/5 and wrote, ‘‘Rangoon is an epic love saga with strong strong emotional quotient, riveting second hour and nail-biting finale. Watch it for its layered plot, serpentine twists, proficient storytelling and bravura performances, its a content-driven film that's worth a recommendation’’. Praising Ranaut's performance he further wrote, ‘‘Kangana portrays the lifeline of Rusi and Nawab with commanding authority; She owns every sequence she appears in, she makes every moment come alive with a memorable act. What's noteworthy is that Kangana is effortless and stands tall in the most challenging sequences’’. Raja Sen from Rediff gave the film a rating of 4/5 and wrote, ‘‘Rangoon haunts in unlikely fashion and, while the director's most straightforward picture, holds enough of its own marvels to justify multiple viewings’’. Praising Ranaut's performance he further wrote, ‘‘Kangana Ranaut is extraordinary as she rides and throws and dances with aplomb in what is physically an immensely demanding part. Ranaut looks like she knows how to actually crack a whip instead of just hurl one around, and acquits herself admirably in old-world stuntwoman sequences, all the while playing the part with enough vulnerability and insecurity to mark Julia out as a confused girl who doesn't quite know what she's doing’’. Devarsi Ghosh of India Today gave the film a rating of 3.5/5 and wrote, ‘‘Rangoon is gorgeous-looking film with great cinematography, fantastic sound design and marvellous choreography’’.

Ujala Ali Khan from The National gave the film a rating of 4/5 and wrote, ‘‘The breathtaking cinematography and attention to detail in the film are remarkable; Cinematographer Panjak Kumar does a great job of delivering a believable peak into the past, and the leading trio slip effortlessly into their roles’’. Praising Ranaut's performance she further wrote, ‘‘The standout star is without a doubt Ranaut who does complete justice to Julia and, just like Fearless Nadia, takes your breath away with her stunts; Queen Kangana proves that she is here to stay’’. Mike McCahill from The Guardian gave the film a rating of 4/5 and called it a ‘‘sweeping second world war epic that describes a collision of worlds’’. He further wrote, ‘‘they've produced a properly expansive and enthralling afternoon matinee, owing as much to the David Lean back catalogue as it does to the industry that gifted us Lagaan – and those films didn't have dance numbers about winding up Hitler’’. Meena Iyer from Times of India gave the film a rating of 3.5/5 and wrote, ‘‘Rangoon is an ambitious attempt to actually tell a triangular love story against the backdrop of war, the canvas is huge and Pankaj Kumar's cinematography is exquisite’’. Praising the performances of lead actors she further wrote, ‘‘Saif gives his movie-entrepreneur act a razor-sharp quality. And, Shahid is outstanding. Kangana of course is the piece de resistance’’. Anupriya Kumar of Reuters wrote, ‘‘Bhardwaj ensure solid performances from his lead cast and topped it with clever execution’’. Praising Ranaut's performance she further wrote, ‘‘Ranaut displays a wide array of moods and emotions and is convincingly vain and generous, manipulative and gullible, brave and frightened’’.

Simon Abrams from RogerEbert.com gave the film a rating of three out of four stars and wrote, "The most remarkable thing about Rangoon isn't how seamless its plot mechanics are or how ideologically nuanced it is; it's the movie's determination to foreground its characters and get you to care what happens to them". Rohit Vats of Hindustan Times gave the film a rating of 2/5 and criticised the writing and the script of the film. He praised Ranaut's performance by calling her the ‘‘Saving grace of Rangoon’’ and wrote, ‘‘Everything boils down to Kangana Ranaut's Julia and her antics. She is undoubtedly a rock solid performer, because if there is one actor who shines despite odd writing, it's her. She is terrific as a theatrics-loving stuntwoman. The poor script never lets Julia reach her pinnacle but she steals the show even with small scenes’’. Shubhra Gupta of The Indian Express gave the film a rating of 1.5/5 and described it as a ‘‘patchy film’’. She praised Ranaut's performance by stating, ‘‘Kangana Ranaut delivers a standout performance in this patchy film; Her body language is spot on, and some of her action sequences are thrilling, even if you can see the computer graphics a mile off. And she gets one spectacular speaking moment, the camera tight on her face, when she speaks of love and desire and heartbreak’’.

NDTV ranked Ranaut as the 2nd Best Actress of the year 2017 for her performance in Rangoon.

== Soundtrack ==
Music for the film was composed by Vishal Bhardwaj, with lyrics by Gulzar. The first song titled "Bloody Hell" was released on 11 January 2017, along with the music video. The full soundtrack was unveiled on 18 January and it consists of 12 songs in total, including the film's theme song. The music rights are bought by T-Series.

== Accolades ==
Award ceremony	Category	Recipient	Result	Ref.
10th Mirchi Music Awards	Best Song Producer (Programming & Arranging)	Clinton Cerejo & Hitesh Sonik – "Julia"	Won	
10th Mirchi Music Awards	Best Background Score	Vishal Bhardwaj	Won	
24th Screen Awards	Best Sound Design	Shahjith Koyeri	Won	
63rd Filmfare Awards	Best Actress (Critics)	Kangana Ranaut	Nominated	
63rd Filmfare Awards	Best Costume Design	Dolly Ahluwalia	Nominated	
63rd Filmfare Awards	Best Choreography	Sudesh Adhana for "Bloody Hell"	Nominated	
63rd Filmfare Awards	Best Cinematographer	Pankaj Kumar	Nominated	
63rd Filmfare Awards	Best Art Direction	Subrata Chakraborty and Amit Ray	Nominated	
63rd Filmfare Awards	Best Action	Harpal Singh Pali and Ravi Kumar	Nominated	
Pingyao International Film Festival	Best Film	Vishal Bhardwaj	Nominated	
