= Plan 75 =

2022 film by Chie Hayakawa

- Promotional release poster
- Directed by: Chie Hayakawa
- Written by: Chie Hayakawa; Jason Gray
- Produced by: Eiko Mizuno-Gray; Jason Gray; Maeva Savinien
- Starring: Chieko Baisho; Hayato Isomura; Stefanie Arianne
- Cinematography: Hideho Urata
- Edited by: Anne Klotz
- Music by: Rémi Boubal
- Production companies: Loaded Films; Urban Factory; Happinet-Phantom Studios; Dongyu Club; WOWOW; Fusee
- Distributed by: Happinet (Japan); TBA Studios (Philippines)
- Release dates: 20 May 2022 (Cannes Film Festival); 17 June 2022 (Japan); 7 December 2022 (Philippines)
- Running time: 112 minutes
- Countries: Japan; Philippines; France
- Languages: Japanese; Filipino

Plan 75 is a 2022 dystopian drama film directed by Chie Hayakawa, starring Chieko Baisho, Hayato Isomura and Stefanie Arianne. It was selected as the Japanese entry for the Best International Feature Film at the 95th Academy Awards, but was not nominated.

== Plot ==
In a near-future Japan, the Japanese government creates a program called "Plan 75" that offers free euthanasia services to all Japanese citizens 75 and older to deal with its rapidly ageing population.

== Cast ==
- Chieko Baisho as Michi Kakutani
- Hayato Isomura as Hiromu Okabe
- Stefanie Arianne as Maria
- Yuumi Kawai as Yōko Nariyama
- Takao Taka as Yukio Okabe
- Ōkata Hisako as Ineko
- Kazuyoshi Kushida as Fujimaru
- Yusaku Mori as Young Man
- Yoko Yano as Michi's co-worker
- Mari Nakayama as Michi's co-worker

== Production ==
The film is based on a short film of the same title, also directed by Chie Hayakawa, that was released as part of the 2018 anthology film Ten Years Japan.

== Release ==
The film premiered at the Un Certain Regard section of the 75th annual Cannes Film Festival on 20 May 2022. The film also won the Special Mention award in the Caméra d'Or competition. The film was released in Japan on 17 June. The film was selected as the Japanese entry for the Best International Feature Film at the 95th Academy Awards.

Film distributor TBA Studios had acquired the theatrical distribution rights to the film in the Philippines, one of the co-producing countries for this film.

== Reception ==
=== Critical response ===
Plan 75 has an approval rating of 95% on review aggregator website Rotten Tomatoes, based on 55 reviews, and an average rating of 7.4/10. The website's critical consensus states: "Sensitive and insightful, Plan 75 uses its sci-fi setting to explore our relationship with death -- and what it really means to live". Metacritic assigned the film a weighted average score of 70 out of 100, based on 15 critics, indicating "generally favorable reviews".

Diego Semerene of Slant Magazine rated the film 3 stars out of 4 and wrote that "With stinging precision, Hayakawa Chie reveals a culture that seems almost mobilized to destroy its own soul." Stephanie Bunbury of Deadline Hollywood wrote that "Stylistically, it looks a bit like a training film. What this means – the brilliance of this film – is that Hayakawa is able to make the idea of wiping out a generation seem drably normal within about quarter of an hour, something to ponder in itself." Tim Grierson of Screen Daily wrote that the film "may seem like it’s about ageing, but more accurately it is about the importance of community".

James Hadfield of The Japan Times rated the film 4 stars out of 5 and wrote that "as the film progresses, a sense of numb resignation sets in. But Hayakawa refuses to end on a resolutely downbeat note — and in its haunting closing shot, “Plan 75” achieves something close to an epiphany." Clarence Tsui of the South China Morning Post also rated the film 4 stars out of 5 and wrote that "throughout the film, Hayakawa implies rather than explains, and this tactfulness instils Plan 75 with the power one expects of a bitter denunciation for our troubling times." Jaden S. Thompson of The Harvard Crimson also rated the film 4 stars out of 5, writing that it "upholds the inherent value of human life with its introspective writing and performances."

=== Accolades ===
Award	Category	Recipient(s)	Result	Ref.
35th Nikkan Sports Film Awards	Best Film	Plan 75	Nominated	
35th Nikkan Sports Film Awards	Best Director	Chie Hayakawa	Nominated	
35th Nikkan Sports Film Awards	Best Actress	Chieko Baisho	Won	
35th Nikkan Sports Film Awards	Best Supporting Actor	Hayato Isomura	Nominated	
35th Nikkan Sports Film Awards	Best Supporting Actress	Yūmi Kawai	Nominated	
35th Nikkan Sports Film Awards	Best Newcomer	Yūmi Kawai	Won	
47th Hochi Film Awards	Best Picture	Plan 75	Nominated	
47th Hochi Film Awards	Best Director	Chie Hayakawa	Nominated	
47th Hochi Film Awards	Best Actress	Chieko Baisho	Nominated	
47th Hochi Film Awards	Best Supporting Actor	Hayato Isomura	Nominated	
47th Hochi Film Awards	Best Supporting Actress	Yuumi Kawai	Nominated	
77th Mainichi Film Awards	Best Picture	Plan 75	Nominated	
77th Mainichi Film Awards	Best Director	Chie Hayakawa	Nominated	
77th Mainichi Film Awards	Best Screenplay	Chie Hayakawa	Won	
77th Mainichi Film Awards	Best Actress	Chieko Baisho	Nominated	
77th Mainichi Film Awards	Best Cinematography	Hideho Urata	Nominated	
77th Mainichi Film Awards	Best Sound Recording	Masaru Usui	Nominated	
65th Blue Ribbon Awards	Best Film	Plan 75	Nominated	
65th Blue Ribbon Awards	Best Director	Chie Hayakawa	Won	
65th Blue Ribbon Awards	Best Actress	Chieko Baisho	Won	
65th Blue Ribbon Awards	Best Supporting Actor	Hayato Isomura	Nominated	
16th Asian Film Awards	Best Actress	Chieko Baisho	Nominated	
16th Asian Film Awards	Best Supporting Actress	Yuumi Kawai	Nominated	
16th Asian Film Awards	Best New Director	Chie Hayakawa	Nominated	
16th Asian Film Awards	Best Cinematography	Hideho Urata	Nominated	
46th Japan Academy Film Prize	Best Screenplay	Chie Hayakawa	Nominated	
46th Japan Academy Film Prize	Best Actress	Chieko Baisho	Nominated	
44th Yokohama Film Festival	Yoshimitsu Morita Memorial Best New Director	Chie Hayakawa	Won	
44th Yokohama Film Festival	Best Actress	Chieko Baisho	Won	
44th Yokohama Film Festival	Best Supporting Actor	Hayato Isomura	Won	
44th Yokohama Film Festival	Best Supporting Actress	Yuumi Kawai	Won	

== See also ==
- Cinema of Japan
- List of submissions to the 95th Academy Awards for Best International Feature Film
- List of Japanese submissions for the Academy Award for Best International Feature Film
