= Two Seasons, Two Strangers =

2025 Japanese film

- Promotional poster
- Japanese: 旅と日々
- Literally: Travel and daily life
- Directed by: Sho Miyake
- Screenplay by: Sho Miyake
- Based on: A View of the Seaside and Mr. Ben and his Igloo by Yoshiharu Tsuge
- Produced by: Masayoshi Johnai
- Starring: Shim Eun-kyung; Yuumi Kawai; Mansaku Takada; Shiro Sano; Shinichi Tsutsumi
- Cinematography: Yuta Tsukinaga
- Edited by: Keiko Okawa
- Music by: Hi'Spec
- Production company: The Fool
- Distributed by: Bitters End
- Release dates: August 15, 2025 (Locarno); November 7, 2025 (Japan)
- Running time: 89 minutes
- Country: Japan
- Languages: Japanese; Korean
- Box office: $408,977

Two Seasons, Two Strangers (Japanese: 旅と日々, romanized: Tabi to Hibi, lit. 'Journeys and Days') is a 2025 Japanese drama film written and directed by Sho Miyake, based on the manga short stories "A View of the Seaside" and "Mr. Ben and His Igloo" by Yoshiharu Tsuge. It follows Lee, a scriptwriter who is processing what is happening in her life.

The film had its world premiere in the main competition of the 78th Locarno Film Festival on 15 August 2025, where it won the Golden Leopard.

== Cast ==
- Shim Eun-kyung as Lee
- Yuumi Kawai as Nagisa
- Mansaku Takada as Natsuo
- Shirō Sano as professor Uonuma / Uonuma's brother
- Shinichi Tsutsumi as Ben-zō

== Plot ==
A film scriptwriter struggles at her desk. She writes the script of a film whose scenes we witness next: the story of a young man and woman on vacation in a town by the beach who seem attracted to each other but who fail to realize their fantasies when the girl states she must leave the following day. We then witness a presentation in a class of film students consisting of the scriptwriter and other members of the production team. We notice how in real life the scriptwriter is virtually unable to communicate in a social context, in a sense offering a clue into a possible failed relationship that inspired her script. After the professor of the film class dies, a colleague recommends a trip.

The rest of the film takes place in the snowy mountains. Having failed to secure rooms in proper hotels, she finds herself accepting a dingy inn in which she must sleep in the same room as the old man who runs it, perhaps also owing to her inability to manage social situations effectively and stand up for herself.

The innkeeper attempts to inspire her writing during her current dry spell, recommending she make a comedy, or write about him, but his words are insufficiently inspiring to her.

When the innkeeper steals an ornamental carp from a neighbor's fish farm, the scriptwriter loses her camera, another visual and nonverbal means of coping that she had come to rely upon when it was gifted to her by the deceased filmmaker's brother. Struggling once more with this latest disappointment, she imagines a scene in a ninja movie which offers a simplistic version of the experience she just had losing her camera.

The police, who never suspect the innkeeper's crime, have nonetheless visited the inn to investigate the found camera and the discovered footprints by the fish farm. They notice the innkeeper has a fever, and they take him to the hospital.

The film ends with the scriptwriter walking through snowy fields to the train station. It is unclear whether this trip will have helped her in any way as her colleague had promised her. However, the film ends with the same sense with which it began, of the struggle to turn authentic experience into art, fraught as that is with effort and uncertainty.

== Production ==
The film co-produced by Culture Entertainment, Sedic International, and TheFool was acquired by the Japanese distribution company Bitters End, for international sales and Japanese distribution in May 2025. It was featured in Cannes market lineup.

== Release ==
Two Seasons, Two Strangers had its World Premiere at the 78th Locarno Film Festival on 15 August 2025, and competed for Golden Leopard.

The film was presented in the Zabaltegi-Tabakalera section at the 73rd San Sebastián International Film Festival on 25 September 2025. It also competed in the Competition section of the 30th Busan International Film Festival on September 19, 2025 for 'Busan Awards'.

It was also screened in International Perspective at the São Paulo International Film Festival on 20 October 2025.

On 27 October it was screened at the Hong Kong Asian Film Festival in the Wide Angle section.

It was screened in Open Zone section of the Stockholm International Film Festival on 10 November 2025. It was presented in 'Country Focus: Japan - 2025' section of the 56th International Film Festival of India in November 2025. It was presented in the Panorama section of the 20th Jogja-NETPAC Asian Film Festival on 30 November 2025.

It was selected to compete in the Asian Feature Film Competition of the 36th Singapore International Film Festival and had its Singapore Premiere on 3 December 2025. It also competed in the Red Sea: Competition strand at the Red Sea International Film Festival and had screening on 8 December 2025.

The film was released on November 7, 2025 in Japanese theatres by Bitters End. It is also slated to release in South Korea in the winter season. Rights for the film were also acquired for the United States (Several Futures), France (Art House Films), China (Unknown Pleasures Pictures), Taiwan (Sky Digi Entertainment), Hong Kong (Edko Films), Israel (Lev Cinemas), Greece (Weird Waves), Portugal (Leopardo Filmes), and Indonesia (PT Falcon).

== Reception ==
=== Critical response ===
On the review aggregator website Rotten Tomatoes, 95% of 19 critics' reviews are positive. Metacritic, which uses a weighted average, assigned the film a score of 93 out of 100, based on five critics, indicating "universal acclaim".

Robert Daniels of RogerEbert.com gave the film four out of four stars and wrote, "Miyake is not only one of the great Japanese filmmakers of his generation. He is also among the best at imbuing neglected people with humanity and injecting aching empathy into modest stories. Two Seasons, Two Strangers might be him at his best."

=== Accolades ===
Award	Date of ceremony	Category	Recipient	Result	Ref.
International Film Festival of Kerala	19 December 2025	Golden Crow Pheasant for Best Film	Two Seasons, Two Strangers	Won	
Locarno Film Festival	16 August 2025	Golden Leopard	Two Seasons, Two Strangers	Won	
Locarno Film Festival	16 August 2025	"The environment is quality of life" Prize offered by the Ticino Department of Internal Affairs	Two Seasons, Two Strangers	Won	
Busan International Film Festival	26 September 2025	Busan Award for Best Film	Two Seasons, Two Strangers	Nominated	
Asia Pacific Screen Awards	27 November 2025	Best Film	Two Seasons, Two Strangers	Nominated	
Asia Pacific Screen Awards	27 November 2025	Best Cinematographer	Yuta Tsukinaga	Nominated	
Nikkan Sports Film Awards	28 December 2025	Best Actress	Shim Eun-kyung	Nominated	
Yokohama Film Festival	1 February 2026	Best Cinematographer	Yuta Tsukinaga	Won	
Yokohama Film Festival	1 February 2026	Best Supporting Actress	Yuumi Kawai	Won	
Yokohama Film Festival	1 February 2026	Best Newcomer	Mansaku Takada	Won	
Mainichi Film Awards	10 February 2026	Best Film	Two Seasons, Two Strangers	Nominated	
Mainichi Film Awards	10 February 2026	Best Director	Sho Miyake	Nominated	
Mainichi Film Awards	10 February 2026	Best Lead Performance	Shim Eun-kyung	Nominated	
Mainichi Film Awards	10 February 2026	Best Supporting Performance	Shinichi Tsutsumi	Nominated	
Mainichi Film Awards	10 February 2026	Best Cinematography	Yuta Tsukinaga	Nominated	
Mainichi Film Awards	10 February 2026	Best Art Direction	Masato Nunobe	Nominated	
Mainichi Film Awards	10 February 2026	Best Sound Recording	Takamitsu Kawai	Nominated	
Kinema Junpo Awards	19 February 2026	Best Film	Two Seasons, Two Strangers	Won	
Kinema Junpo Awards	19 February 2026	Best Actress	Shim Eun-kyung	Won	
