= Ten Years Japan =

2018 Japanese anthology film

- 十年 (Jû-nen)
- Directed by: Chie Hayakawa; Yusuke Kinoshita; Megumi Tsuno; Akiyo Fujimura; Kei Ishikawa
- Written by: Chie Hayakawa; Yusuke Kinoshita; Megumi Tsuno; Akiyo Fujimura; Kei Ishikawa
- Produced by: Miyuki Takamatsu; Miyuki Fukuma; Eiko Mizuno Gray; Jason Gray
- Starring: Satoru Kawaguchi; Jun Kunimura; Hana Sugisaki; Chizuru Ikewaki; Taiga Nakano
- Music by: Hiroyuki Onogawa; Masamichi Shinego; Takashi Ueno; Sato Taiki
- Production companies: Bang-Boo Films; trixta; Bun-Buku; cogitoworks
- Distributed by: Golden Scene
- Release dates: 7 October 2018 (BIFF); 3 November 2018 (Japan)
- Running time: 99 minutes
- Country: Japan
- Language: Japanese

Ten Years Japan (Jû-nen) is a 2018 Japanese drama anthology film. Featuring five short stories by directors Chie Hayakawa, Yusuke Kinoshita, Megumi Tsuno, Akiyo Fujimura, and Kei Ishikawa, the film imagines the country's near future through themes of aging, conformity, technology, and militarization.

Following the structure of the Hong Kong original, Ten Years Japan was developed as part of a multinational project expanding the concept to several Asian countries. It began with the original Ten Years (2015), followed by Ten Years Thailand (2018) and Ten Years Taiwan (2018), as well as Ten Years Japan, and later Ten Years Myanmar (2023).

The film was first screened at the Busan International Film Festival (BIFF).

== Synopsis ==
Unlike the politically charged tone of the original, Ten Years Japan adopts a restrained, introspective approach. Its focuses on the nation's internal anxieties and communicate through personal and emotional storytelling rather than open protest. The anthology comprises five short films exploring Japan's futures:

Plan 75 by Chie Hayakawa: A dystopian drama in which a salaryman promotes a voluntary euthanasia program for seniors, reflecting Japan's aging crisis.

Mischievous Alliance by Yusuke Kinoshita: Children are implanted with surveillance-driven education devices, shaping them into obedient workers under institutional control.

Data by Megumi Tsuno: A teenage girl reconnects with her deceased mother by accessing her digital memories, discovering her untold private life.

The Air We Can't See by Akiyo Fujimura: A young girl living in a closed underground shelter searches for her lost friend in a world of toxic pollution.

For Our Beautiful Country by Kei Ishikawa: Amid an unspecified overseas conflict, Japan reinstates military service.

== Production ==
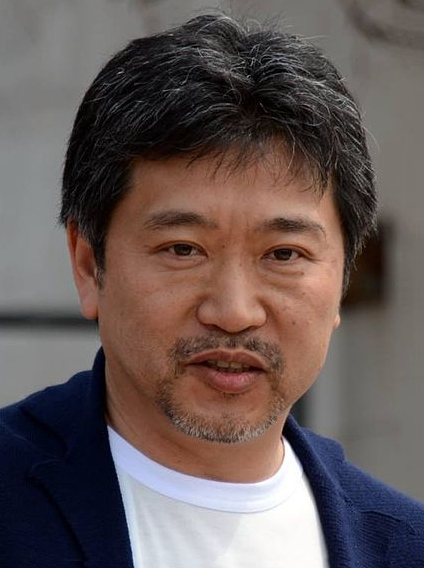
Executive producer Hirokazu Kore-eda

In 2015, Japanese producer Miyuki Takamatsu watched the original Hong Kong Ten Years (2015) at the Far East Film Festival, decided to contact the Hong Kong production team to make a Japanese version. At the same time, she hoped to use this opportunity to promote emerging directors and cultivate new blood outside of the "Japanese Four Ks" — Hirokazu Kore-eda, Naomi Kawase, Kiyoshi Kurosawa, and Takeshi Kitano. Kore-eda agreed with Takamatsu's concept of nurturing new talent, and thus accepted the role of executive producer for the film.

The production team invited several up-and-coming Japanese directors, asking them to write an original story set 10 years in the future, with each story limited to 20 minutes. Some of the selected individuals were arranged to have interviews with Kore-eda, and in the end, five were chosen to participate in the film's production.

The five directors created more than 30 scripts for the film, from which Kore-eda selected five stories to be filmed. During production, Kore-eda also gave many suggestions regarding the scripts and editing work of the five directors — such as proposing, "Could this shot be removed?" — but always respected the directors’ final decisions.

== See also ==
- Plan 75 (2022), a full feature film of the first segment.
