= Until the T-shirt Dries =

- Also known as: Tシャツが乾くまで
- Genre: Melodrama; Romance
- Written by: Miku Ubukata
- Starring: Yū Aoi; Ayumu Nakajima; Fumiya Takahashi; Kaho; Kenichi Matsuyama
- Music by: Haruka Nakamura
- Opening theme: Mishiranu Ito by Spitz
- Country of origin: Japan
- Original language: Japanese

Production
- Producers: Yukitoshi Chiba; Akira Miyagawa

Original release
- Network: TBS
- Release: July 10, 2026

Until the T-shirt Dries (Japanese: Tシャツが乾くまで, Hepburn: T-shatsu ga Kawaku Made) is a 2026 romantic Japanese television drama starring Yū Aoi, Ayumu Nakajima, Fumiya Takahashi, Kenichi Matsuyama, and Kaho. It is currently airing on Tokyo Broadcasting System Television on its Friday night slot. It features scenario written by Miku Ubukata, who is also known for Silent.

== Summary ==
Sakiko Seo leads a peaceful and happy life together with her husband, Mitsuru, who runs a cafe. There is one problem: Sakiko is extremely busy with meetings during the third Friday of every month, which is the same as the cafe's regular day off. Despite this, they support each other and share the household chores.

One day, Sakiko receives news that Mitsuru has been involved in a highway bus crash in Nagano Prefecture. Mitsuru is missing, while all other passengers and the driver have deceased.

Sakiko also meets Itsuki Sonoda, a neighbor whom she had become acquainted with at a local laundromat. Itsuki also lost his wife, Azusa, in the same bus accident. He reveals some details hinting that his wife and Mitsuru might be having an affair; the two had been meeting each other every third Friday, and were sitting together on the bus during their trip to Nagano.

As Sakiko and Itsuki try to unveil the truth about the relationship between Azusa and Mitsuru, they also begin to wonder whether they are allowed to move on from their grief.

== Cast ==
- Yū Aoi as Sakiko Seo (40): An editor for a wedding magazine and Mitsuru's wife.
- Ayumu Nakajima as Itsuki Sonoda (38): An office worker at a confectionery company and Azusa’s husband.
- Kenichi Matsuyama as Mitsuru Seo (40): An owner who runs cafe "Hikouki" and Sakiko's husband.
- Kaho as Azusa Sonoda (34): Itsuki's wife who works part-time at a used bookstore. She's also a mother to a son, Sho.
- Fumiya Takahashi as Naoto Yano (28): A pragmatic worker at cafe Hikouki.

== Production ==
Screenwriter Miku Ubukata reveals that the team had considered using the word dress shirt instead of T-shirt on the title, but backed off because dress shirt gives an "affair-like vibe." A T-shirt, on the other hand, is considered as a neutral item that doesn't really distinguish between men and women. They also considered naming it "Before the T-shirt Dries" (Tシャツが乾く前に) to add a touch of nuance, but after weighing the rhythm of the words and other factors, they ultimately settled on "Until the T-shirt Dries."
