= Anime Supremacy! (film) =

2022 film by Kōhei Yoshino

- Kanji: ハケンアニメ！
- Revised Hepburn: Haken Anime!
- Directed by: Kōhei Yoshino
- Screenplay by: Yōsuke Masaike
- Based on: Anime Supremacy! by Mizuki Tsujimura and CLAMP
- Produced by: Naoya Takahashi; Maki Kimura
- Starring: Riho Yoshioka; Tomoya Nakamura; Tasuku Emoto; Machiko Ono
- Cinematography: Motonobu Kiyoku
- Edited by: Sōichi Ueno
- Music by: Yoshihiro Ike
- Animation by: Production I.G
- Production company: Toei Tokyo Studios
- Distributed by: Toei Company, Ltd.
- Release date: May 28, 2022
- Running time: 128 minutes
- Country: Japan
- Language: Japanese

Anime Supremacy! (Japanese: ハケンアニメ！, Hepburn: Haken Anime!) is a 2022 Japanese drama film based on a novel with a same name written by Mizuki Tsujimura and illustrated by manga artist group CLAMP. The film is directed by Kōhei Yoshino, written by Yōsuke Masaike, distributed by Toei Company, and stars Riho Yoshioka, Tomoya Nakamura, Tasuku Emoto and Machiko Ono. The film was released in Japan in May 28, 2022.

== Premise ==
Hitomi Saito, who has jumped into the world of the anime industry, makes her directorial debut and competes for the title of "Haken" (supremacy) with the star director of her dreams, Chiharu Ōji. Chiharu, who previously produced many mega-hit films, is returning to the director's chair for the first time in eight years. Hitomi struggles to win the title together with the peculiar producer and her unique colleagues.

== Cast ==
- Riho Yoshioka as Hitomi Saito
- Tomoya Nakamura as Chiharu Ōji
- Tasuku Emoto as Satoru Yukishiro
- Machiko Ono as Kayoko Arishina
- Kanji Furutachi as Koshigaya
- Seiji Rokkaku as Seki
- Marika Kouno as Aoi Shino
- Asuka Kudō as Shuhei Monemori
- Tomoya Maeno as Negishi
- Karin Ono as Kazuna Namisawa
- Yu Tokui as Maeyamada

=== Voice cast ===
==== Soundback: Playing Stone ====
- Yuki Kaji as Ryūji
- Megumi Han as Takaya
- Hina Kino as Mayu
- Show Hayami as Kanade's stone

==== Fate Front: Liddle Light ====
- Rie Takahashi as Juri
- Kana Hanazawa as Kiyora
- Yui Horie as Del
- Yū Kobayashi as Shiori
- Reina Kondō as Nanaka
- Nanami Tomaru as Kei
- Ayaka Ohashi as Yuki

Romi Park serves as a narrator for both in-story anime films.

== Production ==
In November 2021, it was announced that a live-action film adaptation of the novel Anime Supremacy!, written by Mizuki Tsujimura and illustrated by manga artist group CLAMP, was in the works, with Kōhei Yoshino directing the film and Yōsuke Masaike as a screenwriter. The cast for the film was announced in the same month, with Riho Yoshioka, Tomoya Nakamura, Tasuku Emoto and Machiko Ono as Hitomi Saito, Chiharu Ōji, Satoru Yukishiro and Kayoko Arishina respectively. Voice actors Yuki Kaji, Megumi Han, Rie Takahashi and Kana Hanazawa were cast as characters for the respective in-story anime films. The principal photography was done at Toei Company's filming studio in Tokyo. Atsutoshi Umezawa from Toei Animation supervised the depiction of the anime industry for the entire film. Genie High will perform the film's theme song, titled "Eclair".

The two in-story anime films were created for the live-action film as films being created and produced by two characters in the film: The first film, Soundback: Playing Stone (サウンドバック 奏の石, Saundo Bakku: Sō no Ishi), and the second film, Fate Front: Liddell Light (運命戦線リデルライト, Unmei Sensen Rideruraito). Soundback: Playing Stone was directed by Azuma Tani and character designed by Eisaku Kubonouchi, while Fate Front: Liddell Light was directed by Takashi Otsuka, and character designed by Takahiro Kishida. Both in-story anime films were produced by Production I.G.

== Release ==
The film was released in Japan in May 28, 2022.

== Reception ==
=== Industry reception ===
A special screening of the film was held on May 10, 2022, for the people in the Japanese animation industry, and made with positive responses.

== Accolades ==
Award	Category	Recipient(s)	Result	Ref.
35th Nikkan Sports Film Awards	Best Film	Anime Supremacy!	Won	
35th Nikkan Sports Film Awards	Yūjirō Ishihara Award	Anime Supremacy!	Nominated	
35th Nikkan Sports Film Awards	Best Actress	Riho Yoshioka	Nominated	
35th Nikkan Sports Film Awards	Best Supporting Actor	Tomoya Nakamura	Nominated	
35th Nikkan Sports Film Awards	Best Supporting Actor	Tasuku Emoto	Won	
35th Nikkan Sports Film Awards	Best Supporting Actress	Machiko Ono	Nominated	
44th Yokohama Film Festival	Best Actress	Riho Yoshioka	Won	
44th Yokohama Film Festival	Best Supporting Actor	Tasuku Emoto	Won	
44th Yokohama Film Festival	Examiner Special Award	Staff and cast	Won	
46th Japan Academy Film Prize	Best Film	Anime Supremacy!	Nominated	
46th Japan Academy Film Prize	Best Director	Kōhei Yoshino	Nominated	
46th Japan Academy Film Prize	Best Screenplay	Yōsuke Masaike	Nominated	
46th Japan Academy Film Prize	Best Actress	Riho Yoshioka	Nominated	
46th Japan Academy Film Prize	Best Supporting Actor	Tasuku Emoto	Nominated	
46th Japan Academy Film Prize	Best Supporting Actress	Machiko Ono	Nominated	
46th Japan Academy Film Prize	Best Music	Yoshihiro Ike	Nominated	
46th Japan Academy Film Prize	Best Art Direction	Satoshi Kanda	Nominated	
46th Japan Academy Film Prize	Best Film Editing	Sōichi Ueno	Nominated	
46th Japan Academy Film Prize	Newcomer of the Year	Karin Ono	Won	
