= 43rd Yokohama Film Festival =

2022 film festival in Yokohama, Japan

- Location: Yokohama, Kanagawa, Japan
- Founded: 1980
- Festival date: 6 February 2022

The 43rd Yokohama Film Festival (第43回ヨコハマ映画祭) was held on 6 February 2022. The awards were announced on 4 December 2021.

== Awards ==
- Best Film: - Intolerance
- Best Director: Keisuke Yoshida - Intolerance, Blue
- Yoshimitsu Morita Memorial Best New Director: Yūjirō Harumoto - A Balance
- Best Screenplay: Keisuke Yoshida - Intolerance, Blue
- Best Cinematographer: Norimichi Kasamatsu - Under the Open Sky
- Best Actor:
  - Arata Furuta - Intolerance
  - Tori Matsuzaka - Intolerance, Last of the Wolves, In Those Days
- Best Actress: Machiko Ono - A Madder Red
- Best Supporting Actor: Ryohei Suzuki - Last of the Wolves
- Best Supporting Actress:
  - Tōko Miura - Drive My Car
  - Yuki Katayama - A Madder Red
- Best Newcomer:
  - Nao - Eternally Younger Than Those Idiots, The Sound of Grass, My Daddy
  - Seina Nakata - Over the Town, In Those Days, A Girl on the Shore
  - Yuumi Kawai - A Balance, It’s a Summer Film
  - Seiichi Kohinata - It’s a Summer Film, Eternally Younger Than Those Idiots
- Examiner Special Award:: Mitsunobu Kawamura and Star Sands Co., Ltd.

== Top 10 ==
1. Intolerance
2. Under the Open Sky
3. Drive My Car
4. Aristocrats
5. A Balance
6. A Madder Red
7. We Made a Beautiful Bouquet
8. Over the Town
9. Last of the Wolves
10. One Summer Story

runner-up: In the Wake
