= She Taught Me Serendipity =

2024 Japanese romantic drama film

- Promotional theatrical release poster

Japanese name
- Kanji: 今日の空が一番好き、とまだ言えない僕は
Transcriptions
- Revised Hepburn: Kyo no Sora ga Ichiban Suki, to Mada Ienai Boku wa
- Directed by: Akiko Ohku
- Screenplay by: Akiko Ohku
- Based on: Kyō no sora ga ichiban suki, to mada ienai boku wa by Shusuke Fukutoku
- Produced by: Shunsuke Koga; Tadashi Nakamura
- Starring: Riku Hagiwara; Yumi Kawai; Aoi Itô; Kodai Kurosaki; Honoka Matsumoto; Arata Furuta
- Cinematography: Natsuyo Nakamura
- Edited by: Hiroyuki Yoneda
- Music by: Tai Motoyoshi
- Production companies: Nikkatsu; Yoshimoto Kogyo; Free Stone Productions; NTT Docomo Studio & Live; THEFOOL; Project DAWN
- Distributed by: Nikkatsu (Japan)
- Release dates: October 29, 2024 (Tokyo International Film Festival); April 25, 2025 (Japan)
- Running time: 127 minutes
- Country: Japan
- Language: Japanese

She Taught Me Serendipity (Japanese: 今日の空が一番好き、とまだ言えない僕は, Hepburn: Kyō no sora ga ichiban suki, to mada ienai boku wa; (Note: lit. 'I, who cannot yet say that today's sky is my favorite')) is a 2024 Japanese romantic drama film written and directed by Akiko Ohku. Based on Shusuke Fukutoku's eponymous novel from 2020, it stars Riku Hagiwara as a college student who falls in love with a student from his class (Yumi Kawai), eventually leading to an unexpected and troubling incident.

She Taught Me Serendipity had its world premiere at the 2024 Tokyo International Film Festival, followed by a theatrical release in Japan in 2025, and a limited theatrical release in South Korea and in France from 2025 to 2026. The film received mostly positive reviews from critics.

== Premise ==
Toru Konishi is a lonely and unremarkable university student who feels disappointed with his life. His small circle mainly includes his friend Yamane and his bathhouse co-worker Sacchan.

His life changes when he meets Hana Sakurada, a classmate. Toru is immediately drawn to her, and their relationship develops through a series of serendipitous coincidences.

However, just as Toru begins to escape his loneliness and genuinely enjoy being alive, Sacchan suddenly disappears.

== Cast ==
- Riku Hagiwara as Toru Konishi, a bored university student who spends his days hanging out with his only friend and cleaning a bathhouse for part-time work.
- Yuumi Kawai as Hana Sakurada, Toru’s fellow student and the woman he becomes captivated by.
- Aoi Ito as Sacchan, Toru’s co-worker at the bathhouse and a musically gifted fellow student.
- Kodai Kurosaki as Yamane, Toru’s only friend on campus.
- Arata Furuta as Sasaki.
- Honoka Matsumoto as Natsuho.
- Kodai Asaka as Sacchan’s father.
- Hajime Anzai as the owner of a local restaurant.

== Production ==
=== Development ===
Director Akiko Ohku met with the author Shusuke Fukutoku during the adaptation process, and told him she did not plan to use the novel’s final scene, to which he agreed. Ohku said she “digested” the story rather than copying it directly, because she wanted to preserve the uncertainty of how the characters’ lives continue after the ending. She also said the original novel made her confront questions about life and current events, which is why she added marching protest scenes to the screenplay.

=== Pre-production ===
The public rollout started in September 2024, when Nikkatsu announced the film’s release decision on September 18, 2024, and the Tokyo International Film Festival selected it for the 37th Tokyo International Film Festival Competition shortly after.

=== Filming ===
The film was Ohku's first time filming in Kyoto, which she said brought back memories of classic Japanese cinema. She specifically mentioned a snow scene near Tō-ji’s five-storey pagoda, proposed by the production team, which reminded her of Ozu.

=== Soundtrack ===
The film's original score was written by Tai Matoyoshi, a Japanese composer.

The story also makes a recurring use of the 1996 song Hatsukoi Crazy by Spitz, a Japanese rock band.

== Release ==
The film had its world premiere at the Tokyo International Film Festival on October 29, 2024 in the Competition section.

Nikkatsu later confirmed a Japanese theatrical release on April 25, 2025, with advance screenings on April 18 at Theatre Shinjuku and Theatre Umeda. After Japan, it played Nippon Connection 2025 in Germany, had a North American premiere at the Japanese Canadian Cultural Centre on June 14, 2025, screened at Japan Cuts 2025, and is in the Japan Foundation Touring Film Programme 2026 as well as Helsinki Cine Aasia 2026.

It was also released theatrically in France by Art House films in 2026, following a limited release in the same country in 2025 for the festival event Les Saisons Hanabi.

== Reception ==
=== Critical reception ===
She Taught Me Serendipity received mostly positive reviews from critics.

Richard Kuipers of Variety called the film a “crisply packaged and deceptively deep gem”.

Scott Phillips of Forbes called the film a “little gem”, adding: “[…] director Akiko Ohku knows how to let a powerful moment breathe on screen. The young cast easily carries the film on their youthful shoulders. Aoi Ito has a heartbreaking monologue in the middle of the film that’s one of the best scenes of the year.”

Mark Schilling gave the film 4 stars out of 5 in The Japan Times, writing: “She Taught Me Serendipity illuminates the message implied in its title: Encounters with random strangers can be happy accidents we come to value and cherish.”
