= Satoru Kawaguchi =

Japanese actor

- 川口覚
- Born: 9 January 1982 (age 43); Tottori, Japan
- Occupation: Actor
- Years active: 2004–present
- Height: 1.72 m (5 ft 7 1/2 in)
- Website: Satoru Kawaguchi Official Website

Satoru Kawaguchi (川口 覚, Kawaguchi Satoru; born 9 January 1982) is a Japanese actor known for his stage work, such as playing the title role in Hamlet directed by Yukio Ninagawa, and for playing Hiromichi in the Bollywood Hindi film Rangoon, directed by Vishal Bhardwaj.

== Career ==
He made his debut in 2007 for the film Water, as a leading role that was shot in 2004 directed/written by Shuichi Yoshida.
Since 2009 to 2014, he had participated in Saitama Next Theatre, headed by producer Yukio Ninagawa. In 2012, he has performed a stage play of Shakespeare's Hamlet, as a main lead, which was praised by Ninagawa as "the best Hamlet acted ever." Then Ninagawa won Grand Prize and Best Directing Award at the 20th Yomiuri Theatre Awards in this work.
In 2017, he portrayed "Hiromichi" in the Bollywood film Rangoon, which was directed by Vishal Bhardwaj, receiving high praise by Indian critics.

== Filmography ==
=== Film ===
Year	Title	Role	Notes
2007	Water	Keiichiro	Leading role
2013	At the Last Stop Called Ghost Chimney	A bus driver	short film
2015	Areno - the wilderness	husband	
2017	Rangoon	Hiromichi	
2017	Wilderness	Kazutoshi Ishii	
2018	Over Drive	Ryuta Seki	
2018	Ten Years Japan	Itami	Segment: Plan75, leading role
2019	Yuhi no Ato	Hideyuki Nimi	
2020	The Voice of Sin	Tatsuo Sone (young)	

=== Television ===
Year	Title	Role	Notes
2014	Soko wo nantoka 2	Hiromitsu Iguchi	
2015	Mondai no aru Restaurant (A Restaurant With Many Problems)	Ikebe	
2015	Konkatsu Deka	Keisuke Okui	
2017	Edojô Muketsu Kaijô	Tomoatsu Godai	
2017	Tsubaki Bunguten: Kamakura Daishoya Monogatari	Kaoru Sonoda	
2018	Holiday Love	Masaki Saito	
2018	Segodon	Ryujirou Nakamura	Taiga drama
2019	Kurobara II	Masaya Shimagaki	
2020	Ale	Nobuo Tatebayashi	

=== Stage ===
- Redon-no-mokuji (2008)
- Sanadafuunroku (2009)
- Utsukushikimono no Densetsu (2010)
- The Taming of the Shrew (2010)
- Saitama Next Theater "Hamlet" (2012)
- Cymbeline (2012)
- Oedipus Rex (2013)
- Like Dorothy (2013)
- Caligula (2014)
- Ikiru to Ikinai no Aida (2014)
- The Soldier's Tale (2016)
- Osei Tojo (2017)
- Shojo Miu (2017)
- After the Quake (2019)
- San-san (2020)
