= Hiroyuki Onoue =

Japanese actor (born 1985)

- Born: July 16, 1985 (age 40); Ibaraki, Osaka, Japan
- Occupation: Actor
- Years active: 1993–present

Hiroyuki Onoue (尾上 寛之, Onoue Hiroyuki; born July 16, 1985) is a Japanese actor.

== Selected filmography ==
=== TV drama ===
- Doremisora (2002)
- Journey Under the Midnight Sun (2006)
- Ryōmaden (2010), Itō Shunsuke
- Carnation (2011)
- Burning Flower (2015)
- Jimmy (2018), Shoji Murakami
- Segodon (2018), Ōkuma Shigenobu
- Scarlet (2020)
- Gift of Fire (2020)
- Detective Yuri Rintaro (2020), Keiichi Ide
- Reach Beyond the Blue Sky (2021), Hara Ichinoshin
- The Child of God Murmurs (2023)

Unknown date

- When the Last Sword Is Drawn
- Teru Teru Kazoku
- Medaka
- Shin Akakabu Kenji Funsenki
- Piano
- Tsunagareta Asu
- Future Amusement Park
- Hatsukoi net.com
- Rookies

=== Film ===
- Break Through! (2005)
- The Letters (2006)
- Sway (2006)
- Love Exposure (2009)
- The Master of Funerals (2019)
- Gift of Fire (2021)
- The Voice of Sin (2020)
- Asakusa Kid (2021), Hachirō Azuma
- Roleless (2022)
- The Young Strangers (2024)

Unknown date

- School Wars
- Oyayubi Sagashi
- Night Picnic
- Rainbow Song
- Awa Dance
- Sakigake!! Otokojuku
