= Yuumi Kawai =

Japanese actress (born 2000)

- 河合 優実
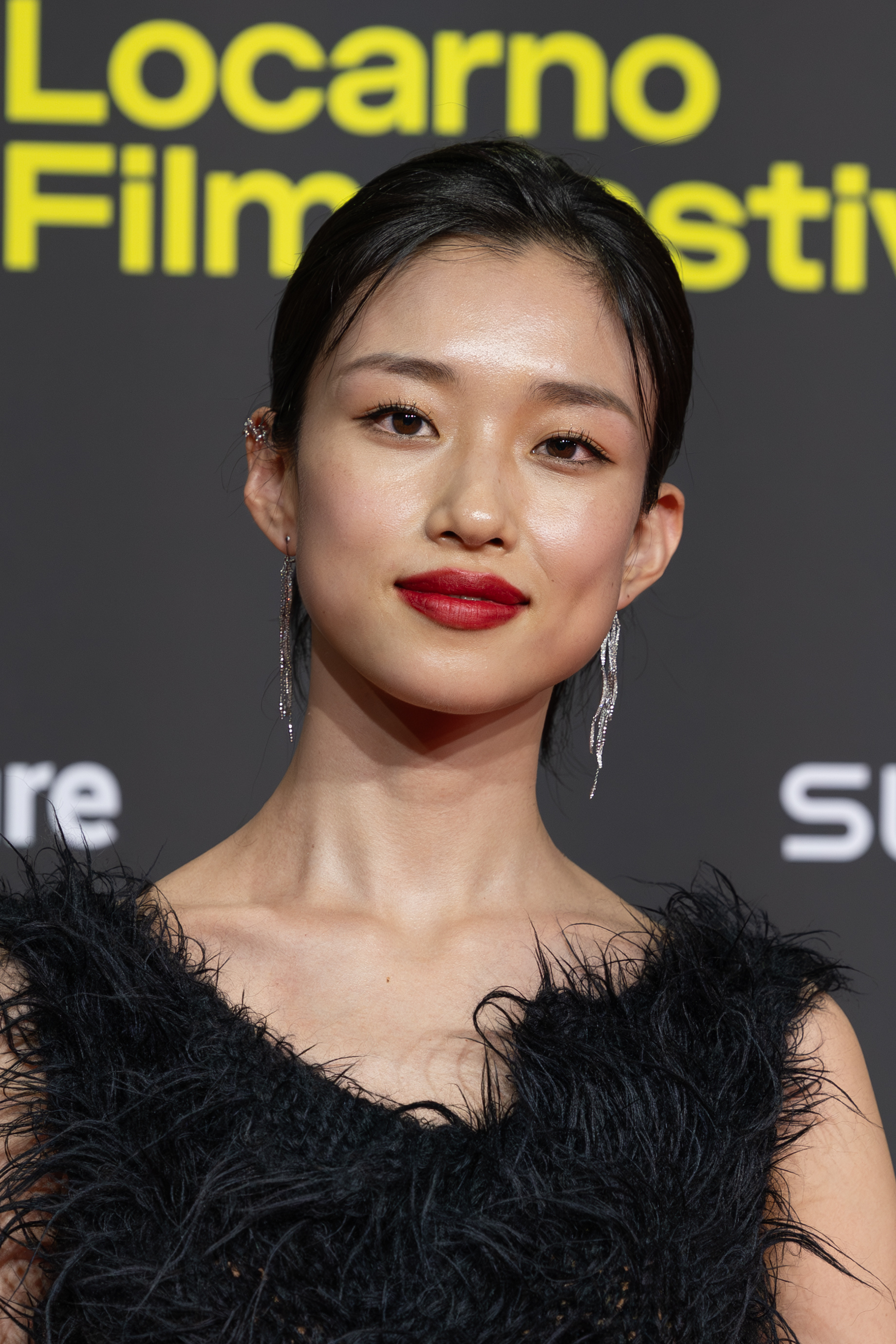
- Kawai on the red carpet at the 2025 Locarno Film Festival
- Born: 19 December 2000 (age 25); Tokyo, Japan
- Education: Nihon University College of Art
- Occupation: Actress
- Years active: 2019–present

Yuumi Kawai or Yūmi Kawai (河合 優実, Kawai Yūmi; born December 19, 2000 in Tokyo) is a Japanese actress.

== Career ==
In 2019, Kawai made her acting debut in the short film Yodominaku, Yamanai. In 2022, she was given the Best Newcomer award at the 43rd Yokohama Film Festival for her roles in A Balance and It's a Summer Film. She continued her success by winning Best Supporting Actress at the 44th Yokohama Film Festival for her roles in various other films, including Plan 75, which earned her a nomination of Best Supporting Actress at the 16th Asian Film Awards.

She has also been active in television drama acting, with roles in Extremely Inappropriate! and The Child Of God Murmurs earning her two acting awards in 2024. In particular, audience of Extremely Inappropriate! (where Kawai plays a high-school student in the 1980s) noticed her resemblance to Momoe Yamaguchi when in-character, and proceeded to name Kawai "Momoe-chan from the Reiwa era". This TV series had a significant impact, and after its broadcast ended, she was cast in commercials for well-known companies such as Shiseido, Uniqlo, and Suntory. According to Oricon's survey, she ranked as the No. 1 breakout actress of the first half of 2024. Kawai was chosen as one of the 15 individuals (or groups) for "This Year's Face" by Model Press, and 2024 became a breakthrough year for her.

In March 2026, she served as the ambassador for the 33rd French Film Festival in Japan (Festival du film français au Japon), where she welcomed guests from France, including Sophie Marceau. In June of that year, she was announced as the lead actress in NHK's spring 2028 Asadora (morning drama) Honno Mokichi and attended a press conference alongside the series' writer, Kankuro Kudo.

== Personal life ==
Her hobbies are dancing, singing, drawing and playing basketball. When she was in the third grade, she started to attend dance studio with her younger sister. Although she went on hiatus in dancing during middle school, Kawai joined her high school dance club. As she continued dancing, she realized the joy of "expressing" and decided to become an actress.

Kawai is good friends with fellow actress Ai Mikami, as both of them attended Nihon University College of Art together.

She respects Mirai Moriyama as both an actor and a dancer.

== Filmography ==
=== Film ===
Year	Title	Role	Notes	Ref.
2019	Yodominaku, Yamanai		Lead role; short film	
2020	Rolling Marbles	Moeko		
2020	A Beloved Wife	High school girl who makes Udon		
2020	Sasaki in My Mind	Naemura		
2021	It's a Summer Film	Beat-ban (Kickboard)		
2021	A Balance	Mei		
2021	Unfeigned Happy Ending	Yū		
2022	Just Remembering	Izumi		
2022	Love Nonetheless	Misaki		
2022	To Be Killed by a High School Girl	Aoi Sugi		
2022	Plan 75	Yōko Narimiya		
2022	A Man	Akane		
2022	A Winter Rose	Tomoka Misaki		
2022	The Lines That Define Me	Kawagishi		
2022	A Hundred Flowers	Misaki		
2023	Sayonara, Girls.	Manami Yamashiro	Lead role	
2023	In Her Room	Yōko		
2023	Heartless	Hana		
2024	A Girl Named Ann	Ann	Lead role	
2024	April Come She Will	Jun Sakamoto		
2024	Look Back	Fujino (voice)	Lead role	
2024	Desert of Namibia	Kana	Lead role	
2024	Hakkenden: Fiction and Reality	Hamaji		
2025	Teki Cometh	Ayumi Sugai		
2025	She Taught Me Serendipity	Hana Sakurada		
2025	A Bad Summer	Aimi Hayashino		
2025	Renoir	Kuriko Kita		
2025	Two Seasons, Two Strangers	Nagisa		

=== Television drama ===
Year	Title	Role	Notes	Ref.
2019	In Hand	Kaori Kikuchi	Episode 4	
2021	Nemesis	Rena Natsumoto	Episode 4	
2022	Teen Regime	Suguri Saiga	Miniseries	
2022	One Night Morning	Tamako	Lead role; episode 4	
2022	First Love	Nanako Kimitsu	Episode 3	
2023	My Family	Nami Kishimoto	Lead role	
2023	The Child of God Murmurs	Haruka Kinoshita	Lead role; television film	
2024	Extremely Inappropriate!	Junko Ogawa		
2024	RoOT/Route of Odd Taxi	Rena	Lead role	
2024	Like a Dragon: Yakuza	Yumi Sawamura		
2025	Anpan	Ranko Asada	Asadora	
2026	Extremely Inappropriate! Special	Junko Ogawa	Television film	
2026	Did Someone Happen to Mention Me?	Emma Nonomura		
2026	Politica Lupin	Miyabi Kobayakawa		
2028	Honno Mokichi	Teruko	Lead role; Asadora	

=== Other television ===
Year	Title	Notes	Ref.
2024	75th NHK Kōhaku Uta Gassen	As a judge	
2025	76th NHK Kōhaku Uta Gassen	She sang several songs with her co-stars from the TV series Anpan.	
2026	The Professionals	As a narrator	

=== Japanese dub ===
Year	Title	Role	Notes	Ref.
2026	The Adventures of Curious George's Creators	Narrator		

=== Music video appearances ===
Year	Song	Artist	Ref.
2021	Duets	Maaya Sakamoto	
2022	Ame San San	King Gnu	

== Awards and nominations ==
Year	Award	Category	Work(s)	Result	Ref.
2022	41st Zenkoku Eiren Awards	Best Supporting Actress	A Balance	Won	
2022	43rd Yokohama Film Festival	Best Newcomer	A Balance and It's a Summer Film	Won	
2022	76th Mainichi Film Awards	Best New Actress	A Balance	Nominated	
2022	95th Kinema Junpo Awards	Best New Actress	A Balance, It's a Summer Film and Unfeigned Happy Ending	Won	
2022	64th Blue Ribbon Awards	Best Newcomer	A Balance and It's a Summer Film	Won	
2022	Elle Cinema Awards 2022	ElleGirl Rising Star	Love Nonetheless and Plan 75	Won	
2022	35th Nikkan Sports Film Awards	Best Supporting Actress	Plan 75, A Winter Rose, A Man, and others	Nominated	
2022	35th Nikkan Sports Film Awards	Best Newcomer	Plan 75, A Winter Rose, A Man, and others	Won	
2022	47th Hochi Film Awards	Best Supporting Actress	Plan 75, A Winter Rose and Just Remembering	Nominated	
2023	44th Yokohama Film Festival	Best Supporting Actress	Plan 75, A Winter Rose, A Man, and others	Won	
2023	16th Asian Film Awards	Best Supporting Actress	Plan 75	Nominated	
2024	50th Hoso Bunka Foundation Prize	Acting Skill Award	NHK Special "Shūkyō nisei" series The Child of God Murmurs	Won	
2024	Elle Cinema Awards 2024	Elle Best Actress	Desert of Namibia	Won	
2024	37th Nikkan Sports Film Awards	Best Actress	A Girl Named Ann, Desert of Namibia and Look Back	Nominated	
2025	79th Mainichi Film Awards	Best Lead Performance	A Girl Named Ann and Desert of Namibia	Won	
2025	67th Blue Ribbon Awards	Best Actress	A Girl Named Ann and Desert of Namibia	Won	
2025	98th Kinema Junpo Awards	Best Actress	A Girl Named Ann and Desert of Namibia	Won	
2025	49th Elan d'or Awards	Newcomer of the Year	Herself	Won	
2025	48th Japan Academy Film Prize	Best Actress	A Girl Named Ann	Won	
2025	18th Asian Film Awards	Best Actress	Desert of Namibia	Nominated	
2026	47th Yokohama Film Festival	Best Supporting Actress	She Taught Me Serendipity, Two Seasons, Two Strangers, and others	Won	
