= Renoir (2025 film) =

2025 film by Chie Hayakawa

- Japanese theatrical release poster

Japanese name
- Kana: ルノワール
Transcriptions
- Revised Hepburn: Runowāru
- Directed by: Chie Hayakawa
- Written by: Chie Hayakawa
- Produced by: Eiko Mizuno-Gray; Jason Gray; Christophe Bruncher; Fran Borgia
- Starring: Yui Suzuki; Lily Franky; Hikari Ishida; Yuumi Kawai; Ayumu Nakajima; Ryota Bando; Hana Hope
- Cinematography: Hideho Urata
- Edited by: Anne Klotz
- Music by: Rémi Boubal
- Production companies: Loaded Films; Happinet Phantom Studios; Dongyu; Ici et Là Productions; Panoranime; Akanga Film Asia; Nathan Studios
- Distributed by: Happinet Phantom Studios (Japan); Eurozoom (France)
- Release dates: 17 May 2025 (Cannes); 20 June 2025 (Japan)
- Running time: 116 minutes
- Countries: Japan; France; Singapore; Philippines; Indonesia
- Language: Japanese
- Box office: $248,559

Renoir (Japanese: ルノワール, Hepburn: Runowāru) is a 2025 coming-of-age drama film written and directed by Chie Hayakawa. Starring Yui Suzuki, Lily Franky, Hikari Ishida, and Ayumu Nakajima, the film follows the childhood of 11-year-old Fuki in late-1980s Tokyo.

The film had its world premiere in the main competition of the 78th Cannes Film Festival on 17 May 2025, where it was nominated for the Palme d'Or. It was theatrically released in Japan on 20 June 2025 by Happinet Phantom Studios.

== Premise ==
11-year-old Fuki navigates adolescence and family struggles in late-1980s Tokyo.

== Cast ==
- Yui Suzuki as Fuki Okita
- Lily Franky as Keiji Okita, Fuki's father
- Hikari Ishida as Utako Okita, Fuki's mother
- Yuumi Kawai as Kuriko Kita
- Ayumu Nakajima as Toru Omaezaki
- Ryota Bando as Kaoru
- Hana Hope as Kate
- Jeffrey Rowe as Jerry

== Production ==
Director Chie Hayakawa drew inspiration from her own childhood experience of having a father with cancer. She had wanted to make the film since her early 20s, but noted that it would have been "too dark" had she done so earlier. She intentionally set the film in 1987, during Japan's bubble economy, as she felt it paralleled current society. Newcomer Yui Suzuki, who plays Fuki, was the first actress Hayakawa saw for the role.

Principal photography took place in Japan from July to September 2024. Filming also took place in the Philippines in November 2024. Hayakawa used French sound recordists and boom operators during production.

== Release ==
Goodfellas acquired the international sales rights to the film on 18 May 2024. A trailer was released on 11 April 2025. The film premiered at the 78th Cannes Film Festival on 17 May 2025. It was theatrically released in Japan on 20 June 2025. In September 2025, Film Movement acquired the film for distribution in North America.

It will compete in the International competition section of the 56th International Film Festival of India in November 2025.

== Reception ==
On the review aggregator website Rotten Tomatoes, 88% of 50 critics' reviews are positive, with an average rating of 6.6/10. The website's consensus reads: "A restrained meditation on grief, Renoir gradually accumulates a big emotional wallop thanks in large part to Yui Susuzki's guileless performance." Metacritic, which uses a weighted average, assigned the film a score of 72 out of 100, based on 12 critics, indicating "generally favorable" reviews.

Wendy Ide of Screen Daily wrote that, while the film might leave questions for the viewer, she called it "an elegant, thoughtful piece of filmmaking that digs into the guilt and confusion that underpins a child’s struggle to process death". Stephanie Bunbury of Deadline commended the entire cast's performances, paying specific note to that of Yui Suzuki, who plays Fuki. She commended the "poignancy and precision of individual scenes" and wrote, "If this story doesn't coalesce as seamlessly as [Chie Hayakawa's] first film does, it still has the power to touch and then to haunt us." Jessica Kiang of Variety called the film "breezy but moving".

=== Accolades ===
Award	Date of ceremony	Category	Recipient(s)	Result	Ref.
Cannes Film Festival	24 May 2025	Palme d'Or	Chie Hayakawa	Nominated	
Asia Pacific Screen Awards	27 November 2025	Best Screenplay	Chie Hayakawa	Won	
Asia Pacific Screen Awards	27 November 2025	Best New Performer	Yui Suzuki	Won	
Nikkan Sports Film Awards	28 December 2025	Best Newcomer	Yui Suzuki	Nominated	
Mainichi Film Awards	10 February 2026	Best Newcomer	Yui Suzuki	Nominated	
Blue Ribbon Awards	17 February 2026	Best Newcomer	Yui Suzuki	Nominated	
Kinema Junpo Awards	19 February 2026	Best Newcomer Actress	Yui Suzuki	Won	
