= Wheel of Fortune and Fantasy =

2021 Japanese anthology film by Ryusuke Hamaguchi

- Festival poster

Japanese name
- Kanji: 偶然と想像
- Literal meaning: Chance and imagination
Transcriptions
- Revised Hepburn: Gūzen to Sōzō
- Directed by: Ryusuke Hamaguchi
- Written by: Ryusuke Hamaguchi
- Produced by: Satoshi Takata
- Starring: Kotone Furukawa; Ayumu Nakajima; Hyunri; Kiyohiko Shibukawa; Katsuki Mori; Shouma Kai; Fusako Urabe; Aoba Kawai
- Cinematography: Yukiko Iioka
- Production companies: Neopa; Fictive
- Distributed by: Reel Pictures (Denmark); Incline (Japan)
- Release dates: March 23, 2021 (BAFICI); July 29, 2021 (Denmark); December 17, 2021 (Japan)
- Running time: 121 minutes
- Country: Japan
- Language: Japanese
- Box office: $471,339

Wheel of Fortune and Fantasy (Japanese: 偶然と想像, Hepburn: Gūzen to Sōzō; lit. "Chance and Imagination") is a 2021 Japanese romantic drama anthology film written and directed by Ryusuke Hamaguchi. The film stars Kotone Furukawa, Katsuki Mori, and Fusako Urabe as the lead actresses of each of the anthology's three segments.

The film previewed online and in cinemas in four cities across the world to buyers, the press, and the festival juries in the Competition of the 71st Berlin International Film Festival from March 1–5, 2021, after which it was awarded the Silver Bear Grand Jury Prize.

It had its public world premiere at the 22nd Buenos Aires International Independent Film Festival on March 23. It was first released nationally in cinemas in Denmark, on July 29, 2021. It was not released across Japan until December 17 the same year.

== Plot ==
=== Episode 1: "Magic (or Something Less Assuring)" ===
On a taxi ride home after a photo shoot, Tsugumi recounts her meeting with a man to her best friend and model Meiko. She speaks gushingly about their immediate mutual attraction, a feeling of "magic", and her excitement over future dates. Meiko later heads to an office where she confronts her ex-boyfriend, Kazuaki, whom she gathered is the same person Tsugumi was referring to. She relates things Tsugumi told her, including that Kazuaki could not get over his ex-girlfriend, and suggests that their relationship could be rekindled. Following a heated argument, Kazuaki hugs Meiko before she runs away.

Three days later, Meiko and Tsugumi are at a cafe when Kazuaki walks past. Tsugumi beckons him inside and introduces him to Meiko. Meiko immediately reveals their past and demands that Kazuaki choose between them, leading Tsugumi to storm out and Kazuaki chasing after her. The sequence is revealed to be fantasy and instead, Meiko quickly excuses herself, leaving Kazuaki and Tsugumi to plan their date alone.

=== Episode 2: "Door Wide Open" ===
College student Sasaki prostrates himself before French professor Segawa, begging the latter not to fail him as it would derail his future as a news anchor, but Segawa remains stern and unsympathetic. Months later at his apartment, Sasaki and his friend-with-benefits, married mother Nao, learn from the news that Segawa has won the prestigious Akutagawa Prize for his new novel. Sasaki coerces Nao into honey trapping the professor in order to create a scandal.

Nao visits Segawa at his office, ostensibly to request an autograph, while the door stays open at Segawa's insistence. She reads aloud an erotic passage from the book and asks explicit questions, though Segawa remains unmoved, and the two end up having a heart-to-heart conversation. Nao confesses that she was recording the conversation, and Segawa requests that she send him the audio. She agrees on the condition that he masturbates to the recording once, to which he verbally agrees. Once home, Nao mistypes the address by accident, and the email ends up being sent to a university administrator. The ensuing scandal leads to Segawa's disgrace and resignation and Nao's divorce.

Years later, Nao runs into Sasaki on the bus. She now works as a proofreader, while him an editor despite his lack of interest in literature. Sasaki shows no remorse for the affair, and Nao grows increasingly annoyed by his presence. Sasaki announces that he is getting married. As Nao reaches her stop, she hands Sasaki her business card, kisses him on the lips, and steps off.

=== Episode 3: "Once Again" ===
Digital technology has mostly been abandoned since 2019 when a virus struck, resulting in uncontrollable leaks of personal and confidential information. Natsuko attends her all-girls high school reunion, finding that she does not fit in nor remember her classmates' names. Later at the train station, she recognizes a classmate she was desperately hoping to meet again and is invited to her home. The two reminisce, but eventually realize that they have mistaken each other for former classmates.

An embarrassed Natsuko attempts to leave but the host, Aya, convinces her to stay. Natsuko reveals that the person she mistook Aya for was her first love and she never got over their breakup in college. Aya offers to play the role of her ex-girlfriend and helps Natsuko vent her unresolved feelings. As they return to the train station, Natsuko learns that Aya mistook her for a classmate she used to play the piano with and admired. Natsuko role-plays as the classmate in turn, which allows Aya to confess to her insecurities despite a seemingly perfect married life. As they eventually part, Aya runs back to Natsuko and tells her that she has finally remembered her old classmate's name, and the two share a passionate embrace.

== Cast ==
The cast includes:

- Kotone Furukawa as Meiko
- Ayumu Nakajima as Kazuaki Kubota
- Hyunri as Tsugumi Konno
- Kiyohiko Shibukawa as Segawa
- Katsuki Mori as Nao
- Shouma Kai as Sasaki
- Fusako Urabe as Moka Natsuko
- Aoba Kawai as Nana Aya

== Soundtrack ==
The soundtrack consists of three short pieces for solo piano by Robert Schumann: Kinderszenen, Op. 15 No. 1 Von fremden Ländern und Menschen, No. 7 Träumerei, and Waldszenen, Op. 82 No. 1 Eintritt. The end credits give the performer's name as Hazuki Kikuchi (菊池葉月). Hazuki Kikuchi is also the name of an actor appearing in several of Hamaguchi's films, although not in Wheel of Fortune and Fantasy. It is not clear if this is one and the same person. The website of the recording studio has details regarding the venue and the instrument used, but not the performer or the date of recording. It also indicates that Hamaguchi was present during the recording session.

== Release ==
On February 11, 2021, the Berlin International Film Festival announced that the film had been selected to have its worldwide premiere in the Competition of the 71st festival.

Due to cinemas in Berlin being closed due to the level of COVID-19 infections, the film did not have its world public premiere in Berlin but was instead previewed online and in cinemas in four other cities across the world to buyers, the press, and the festival juries from March 1–5, 2021.

It was also selected for the Gala Presentation section of the 26th Busan International Film Festival and screened there on October 7, 2021.

It was released in both physical and virtual cinemas in the United States and Canada from October 15, 2021, by Film Movement. It was released in physical and virtual cinemas in the United Kingdom and Ireland on February 11, 2022, by Modern Films.

== Reception ==
Rotten Tomatoes reported that 99% of critics have given the film a positive review based on 108 reviews, with an average rating of 8.4/10. The site's critics consensus reads "Writer-director Ryūsuke Hamaguchi explores multiple facets of the human condition with Wheel of Fortune and Fantasy, all to delightfully affecting effect."

On Metacritic, the film has an assigned score of 86 out of 100, based on 19 critic reviews, denoting "universal acclaim".

Wheel of Fortune and Fantasy was ranked fifth on Cahiers du Cinéma's top 10 films of 2022 list. The film was also named one of Jonathan Rosenbaum's "Best Films of 2022".

== Awards and nominations ==
| Year | Awards | Category | Recipient | Result | Ref. |
|---|---|---|---|---|---|
| 2021 | 71st Berlin International Film Festival | Silver Bear Grand Jury Prize | Ryusuke Hamaguchi | Won | |
| 2021 | 15th Asian Film Awards | Best Film | Wheel of Fortune and Fantasy | Nominated | |
| 2021 | 15th Asian Film Awards | Best Director | Ryusuke Hamaguchi | Nominated | |
