= Chie Hayakawa =

Japanese film director

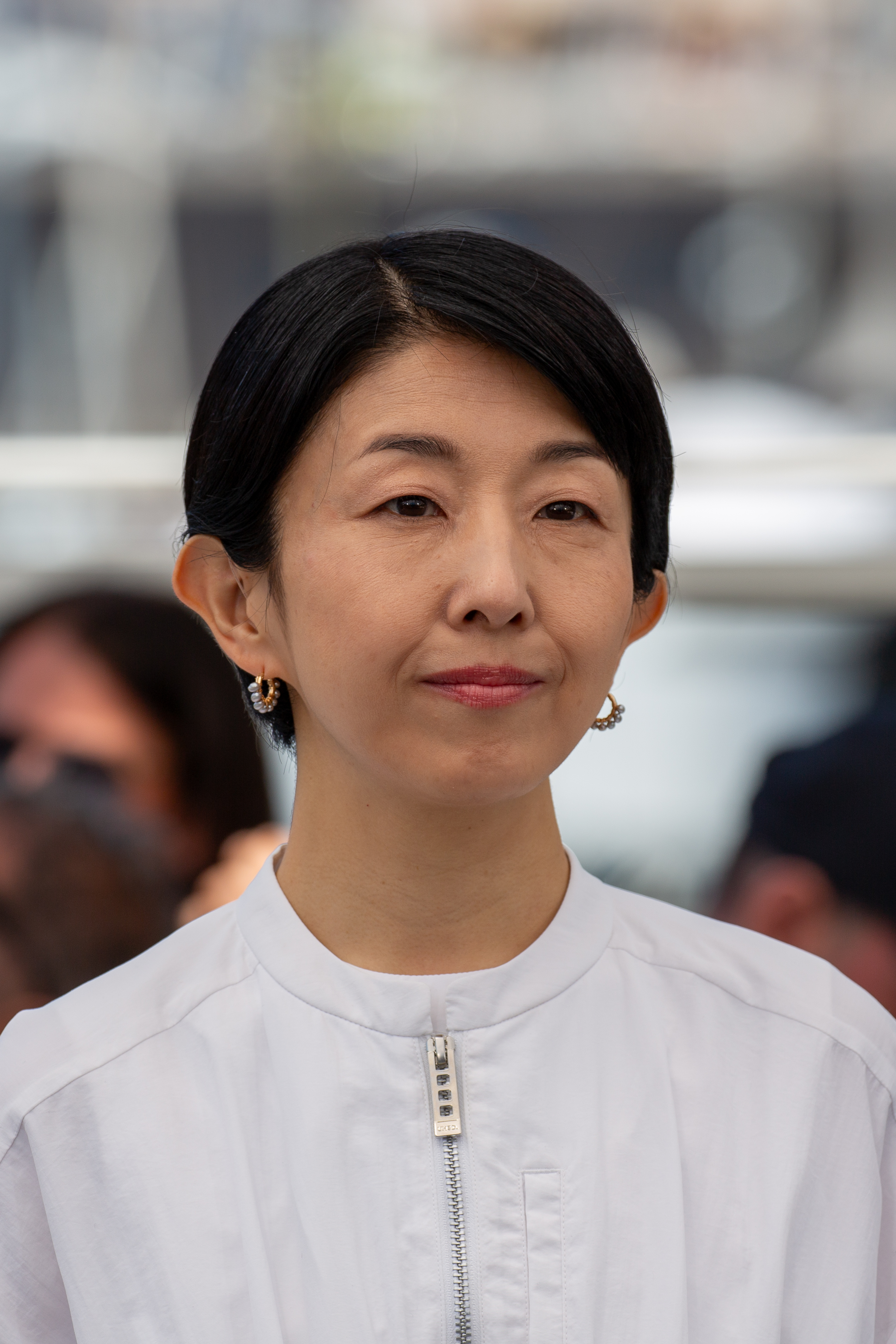
- Hayakawa at the 2025 Cannes Film Festival
- Citizenship: Japanese
- Occupations: Film director, screenwriter
- Years active: 2014–present

Chie Hayakawa (早川千絵, Hayakawa Chie; born August 20, 1976) is a Japanese film director and screenwriter based in Tokyo.

== Personal life and education ==
Hayakawa graduated from the New York School of Visual Arts in 2001. Her various early short films were screened at the school's gallery and film festivals. She gave birth to two children in New York and returned to Tokyo in 2008.

== Career ==
In Tokyo, she enrolled in a one-year film program at a night school whilst working. Her thesis film, Niagara, was selected for the screening at the 2014 Cannes Film Festival, and won the Grand Prix at the Pia Film Festival.

In 2022, her first feature film Plan 75 received Caméra d'Or — Mention Spéciale (also called Caméra d'Or — Mention d'honneur) at the Cannes Film Festival.

In April 2025, her feature film Renoir was officially selected to premiere at the Cannes Film Festival, competing for the Palme d'Or.

== Filmography ==
Year	Title	Notes
2014	Niagara	Short
2018	Ten Years Japan	First segment — short film Plan 75
2022	Plan 75	Caméra d'Or — Special Mention
2025	Renoir	
