= Yuya Yagira =

Japanese actor (born 1990)

Yūya Yagira
- 柳楽 優弥
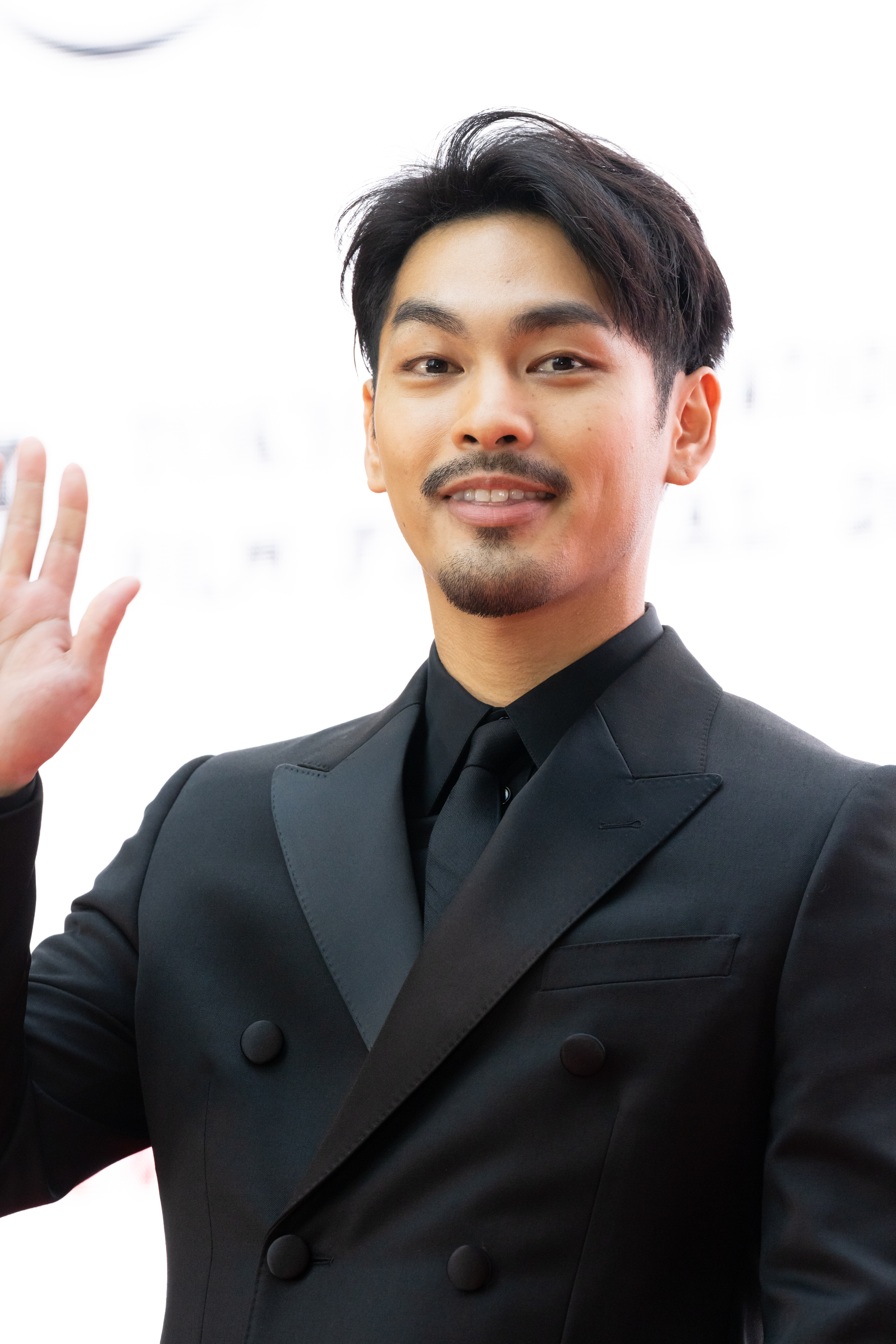
- Yagira at the Tokyo International Film Festival in 2022
- Born: March 26, 1990 (age 36); Tokyo, Japan
- Occupation: Actor
- Years active: 2003–present
- Agent: Stardust Promotion
- Spouse: Ellie Toyota (m. 2010)
- Children: 1

Yuya Yagira (柳楽 優弥, Yagira Yūya; born March 26, 1990) is a Japanese actor. In 2004, he became the youngest winner of the Cannes Film Festival Award for Best Actor for his portrayal of 12-year-old Akira in the highly acclaimed Nobody Knows.

== Career ==
Yagira was 12 years old and not a professional actor, when filming began for Nobody Knows in 2002. He then immediately went on to television projects and other films. He co-starred with Eriko Sato in Akane Yamada's All to the Sea which was released in 2010 and co-starred with Kie Kitano in Taro Hyugaji's Under the Nagasaki Sky, released in 2013.

In 2021, Yagira played young Takeshi Kitano in the biopic Asakusa Kid.

== Personal life ==
=== Family ===
The two first met in highschool when Toyota was a senior at Horikoshi High School, and Yagira was a junior, they began dating shortly after he was able to attain her contact information from a mutual friend. Yagira also revealed that he had proposed to her when he was seventeen. He was not aware at that time that people could not legally marry until they were eighteen, and so Toyota rejected his proposal. Yagira later proposed again two years later when he was nineteen, to which this time Toyota accepted.

On December 2, 2009, Yagira announced on his blog that he was engaged to television personality Ellie Toyota. On January 15, 2010, Yagira and Toyota held their wedding ceremony at Tokyo's Meiji Shrine. They had registered their marriage on January 14. They have one daughter together, born October 13, 2010.

=== Drug overdose ===
Yagira was hospitalized on August 29, 2008 for a drug overdose, with early reports calling it a suicide attempt. Yagira later denied that he had been trying to kill himself, noting that he was the one who called an ambulance after he began feeling ill from taking the pills. According to his blog:

"The incident followed an argument with my family. In a fit of anger I took a larger than usual dosage of my prescription tranquilizers.
As a result I felt ill and asked for an ambulance to be called."

— Japan Zone 1 September 2008

== Brand endorsements ==
In 2018, Yagira became the brand ambassador for Japanese men's grooming brand GATSBY. He starred in the TV Commercial "GATSBY Cop", together with popular Japanese actor Mackenyu Arata.

== Filmography ==
=== Film ===
| Year | Title | Role | Notes | Ref. |
|---|---|---|---|---|
| 2004 | Nobody Knows | Fukushima Akira | Lead role | |
| 2016 | Destruction Babies | Ashihara Taira | Lead role | |
| 2021 | Asakusa Kid | Takeshi Kitano | Lead role | |
| 2022 | The Fish Tale | Hiyo | | |
| 2023 | We're Millennials. Got a Problem? International | Michigami Maribu | | |
| 2024 | A Conviction of Marriage | Natsume Arata | Lead role | |
| 2026 | Shin Gekijōban Keroro Gunsō: Fukkatsu Shite Sokkō Chikyū Metsubō no Kiki de Arimasu! | Toshiro Hijikata (voice) | | |
| 2026 | Ryuji | Ryuji | Lead role | |
| 2027 | Sins of Kujo: The Movie | Taiza Kujo | Lead role | |

=== Television ===
| Year | Title | Role | Notes | Ref. |
|---|---|---|---|---|
| 2010 | Tokyo 23: Survival City | Arai Noboru | | |
| 2011 | Lady: The Last Criminal Profile | Tatsumi Satoshi | Episodes 4 and 5 | |
| 2014 | Aoi Honō | Moyuru Honoo | Lead role | |
| 2014 | Nobunaga Concerto | Oda Nubuyuki | Episode 1 | |
| 2015 | Masshiro | Nakano Kotaro | | |
| 2015 | Mare | Ikehata Daisuke | Asadora | |
| 2017 | Naotora: The Lady Warlord | Ryun Maru | Taiga drama | |
| 2020 | A Day-Off of Kasumi Arimura | Takeda Kevin | Episode 4 | |
| 2021 | Nigatsu no Shosha: Zettai Gokaku no Kyoshitsu | Kuroki Kurodo | | |
| 2022–25 | Gannibal | Agawa Daigo | Lead role; 2 seasons | |
| 2024 | Light of My Lion | Komori Hiroto | Lead role | |
| 2026 | Sins of Kujo | Taiza Kujo | Lead role | |
| 2027 | Mr. Mystery? | Toru Aoyanagi | Lead role | |

== Awards and nominations ==
Name of the award ceremony, year presented, category, nominee of the award, and the result of the nomination
| Award | Year | Category | Work(s) | Result | Ref. |
|---|---|---|---|---|---|
| Cannes Film Festival | 2004 | Best Actor | Nobody Knows | Won | |
| Kinema Junpo Award | 2004 | Best New Actor | Nobody Knows | Won | |
| Kinema Junpo Award | 2017 | Best Actor | Destruction Babies | Won | |
| Yokohama Film Festival | 2005 | Best New Actor | Nobody Knows | Won | |
| Yokohama Film Festival | 2017 | Best Actor | Destruction Babies | Won | |
| Elan d'or Awards | 2022 | Newcomer of the Year | Himself | Won | |
| Asia Contents Awards & Global OTT Awards | 2023 | Best Lead Actor | Gannibal | Nominated | |
| Asia Contents Awards & Global OTT Awards | 2023 | Asian Excellence Award | Gannibal | Won | |
