= Gannibal (TV series) =

2022 Japanese folk horror streaming television series

- Promotional release poster

Japanese name
- Kanji: ガンニバル
Transcriptions
- Romanization: Gan'nibaru
- Genre: Horror; Thriller; Suspense
- Based on: Gannibal by Masaaki Ninomiya
- Written by: Takamasa Oe
- Directed by: Shinzo Katayama
- Starring: Yuya Yagira; Riho Yoshioka; Show Kasamatsu
- Composers: Brian D'Oliviera; Takashi Ohmama
- Country of origin: Japan
- Original language: Japanese
- No. of seasons: 2
- No. of episodes: 15

Production
- Producers: Teruhisa Yamamoto; Tatsuya Iwakura
- Cinematography: Naoya Ikeda
- Running time: 45 minutes
- Production company: Stardust Pictures Dragonfly Entertainment Inc.

Original release
- Network: Disney+
- Release: December 28, 2022 – present

Gannibal (ガンニバル, Gan'nibaru) is a 2022 Japanese folk horror television series. Based on the horror manga of the same name as written and illustrated by Masaaki Ninomiya, it stars Yuya Yagira, Riho Yoshioka and Show Kasamatsu. It premiered on December 28, 2022, on Disney+ internationally and on Hulu in the United States.

On September 21, 2023, a second season was announced, which was released on March 19, 2025.

== Premise ==
A remote village hides dark secrets tied to ancient practices, uncovered after a local's mysterious disappearance. As a new officer investigates, the line between truth and terror begins to blur.

== Cast and characters ==
The Agawa Family

- Yuya Yagira as Daigo Agawa - the new police officer in Kuge Village
- Riho Yoshioka as Yuki Agawa - Daigo's wife
- Kokone Shimizu as Mashiro Agawa - Daigo and Yuki's daughter, who is mute because she witnessed her father kill a paedophile who had befriended her.

The Goto Family

- Show Kasamatsu as Keisuke Goto - the new head of the Goto family after the death of Gin
- Mitsuko Baisho (old) Yuri Tsunematsu (young) as Gin Goto - the recently deceased head of the Goto family, lover of Masamune, mother of Shirogane (and not actually a Goto!)
- Rairu Sugita as Yosuke Goto - Keisuke's younger brother
- Seiji Rokkaku as Kiyoshi Goto - Keisuke and Yosuke's father and the mayor of Kuge village.
- Aoba Kawai as Ai Goto - Keisuke and Yosuke's mother. Escaped Kuge village with Kyosuke, who she rescued from being sacrificed when he was a toddler.
- Mitsuo Yoshihara as Iawo Goto
- Yutaro Nakamura as Ryuji Goto
- Takato Yonemoto as Makoto Goto
- Yoshi Sakou as Mutsuo Goto
- Ryubun Sumori as Naoya Goto
- Kazuki Sawai as 'That Man' - son of Gin and Masamune, named 'Shirogane' and affected with Kuru, from eating human meat. He is the biological father of Keisuke

The Kamiyama Family

- Ryūshin Tei as Yoshimune Kamiyama - Masamune's father, the previous Kuge Village priest, who sacrificed Gin's mother to the Kashihabe, and left Gin to be eaten by them.
- Hashizume Isao (Old) Kura Yuki (Young) as Masamune Kamiyama - the old priest of Kuge Village, lover of Gin and father of Shirogane and Munechika
- Shunsuke Tanaka as Munechika Kamiyama - Masamune's son, who will take over as village Priest when his father retires.

The Kano Family

- Toshihiro Yashiba as Osamu Kano - the previous police officer in Kuge Village who vanished, presumed killed by That Man after finding out about the children the Goto's were sacrificing.
- Reiko Kataoka as Sachiko Kano, Osamu's wife
- Kana Kita as Sumire Kano, Osamu and Sachiko's daughter, secret lover of Keisuke, and pregnant with his child

== Episodes ==
=== Series overview ===
Season	Episodes	Originally released	
Season	Episodes	First released	Last released
1	7	December 28, 2022	February 1, 2023
2	8	March 19, 2025	April 23, 2025

=== Season 1 (2022–2023) ===
No. overall	No. in season	Title	Directed by	Written by	Original release date
1	1	"Offering of Flowers"	Shinzo Katayama	Takamasa Oe	December 28, 2022
2	2	"Attack"	Shinzo Katayama	Takamasa Oe	December 28, 2022
3	3	"Fatal Bullet"	Shinzo Katayama	Takamasa Oe	January 4, 2023
4	4	"Line of Sight"	Hayato Kawai	Takamasa Oe	January 11, 2023
5	5	"Trace"	Hayato Kawai	Takamasa Oe	January 18, 2023
6	6	"Premonition"	Hayato Kawai	Takamasa Oe	January 25, 2023
7	7	"Promise"	Shinzo Katayama	Takamasa Oe	February 1, 2023

=== Season 2 (2025) ===
No. overall	No. in season	Title	Directed by	Written by	Original release date
8	1	"Betrayal"	Shinzo Katayama	Takamasa Oe	March 19, 2025
9	2	"War"	Shinzo Katayama	Takamasa Oe	March 19, 2025
10	3	"Awakening"	Takahide Sano	Satoru Hirohara	March 26, 2025
11	4	"Chaos"	Norichika Oba	Satoru Hirohara	March 26, 2025
12	5	"Reminiscence"	Takahide Sano	Takamasa Oe	April 2, 2025
13	6	"Uprising"	Takahide Sano	Takamasa Oe	April 9, 2025
14	7	"Curse"	Shinzo Katayama	Satoru Hirohara	April 16, 2025
15	8	"Demise"	Shinzo Katayama	Takamasa Oe	April 23, 2025

== Release ==
Gannibal was released internationally on December 28, 2022, on Disney+. On the same day, it was also released on Hulu. A second season was announced and was released on March 19, 2025.

== See also ==
- Gannibal (manga)
