= A Man (film) =

- Film poster
- Directed by: Kei Ishikawa
- Screenplay by: Kōsuke Mukai (ja)
- Produced by: Shuhei Akita; Minori Tabuchi
- Starring: Satoshi Tsumabuki; Sakura Andō; Masataka Kubota
- Cinematography: Tatsuto Kondo (ja)
- Edited by: Kei Ishikawa
- Music by: Cicada
- Production companies: Shochiku; Kinoshita Group; GYAO; Bungeishunjū; Aeon Entertainment
- Distributed by: Shochiku
- Release date: November 18, 2022 (Japan)
- Running time: 121 minutes
- Country: Japan
- Language: Japanese

A Man (Japanese: ある男, romanized: Aru otoko) is a 2022 Japanese psychological thriller film directed by Kei Ishikawa.

Based on the novel of the same name by Keiichiro Hirano, the film premiered at the Horizons section of the 79th edition of the Venice Film Festival.

== Plot ==
In the Miyazaki Prefecture, divorced Rie Takemoto meets a man called Daisuke Taniguchi, with whom she falls in love and soon marries. They have a happy family, until an accident takes Daisuke's life. A year after Daisuke's funeral, a Taniguchi relative tells Rie that man on the funeral's picture, wasn't Daisuke. Shocked by the incident, Rie employs Akira Kido, a lawyer and old friend, to set out to investigate her husband's real identity and background. The more they find out about Daisuke's background, the more shocking truths surface about the past and test their relationships with their own loved ones.

== Cast ==
- Satoshi Tsumabuki: Akira Kido
- Sakura Andō: Rie Taniguchi
- Masataka Kubota: Daisuke Taniguchi
- Nana Seino: Misuzu Gotō
- Hidekazu Mashima (ja): Kiyoshi Taniguchi
- Kazutoyo Koyabu: Nakakita
- Aito Sakamoto: Yūto Taniguchi
- Miyako Yamaguchi: Hatsue Takemoto
- Kitarō (ja): Itō
- Shinsuke Kato (ja): Yanagisawa
- Yuumi Kawai: Akane
- Denden: Kosuge
- Yōko Maki: Kaori Kido
- Akira Emoto: Norio Omiura
