= Riho Yoshioka =

Japanese actress (born 1993)

- 吉岡 里帆
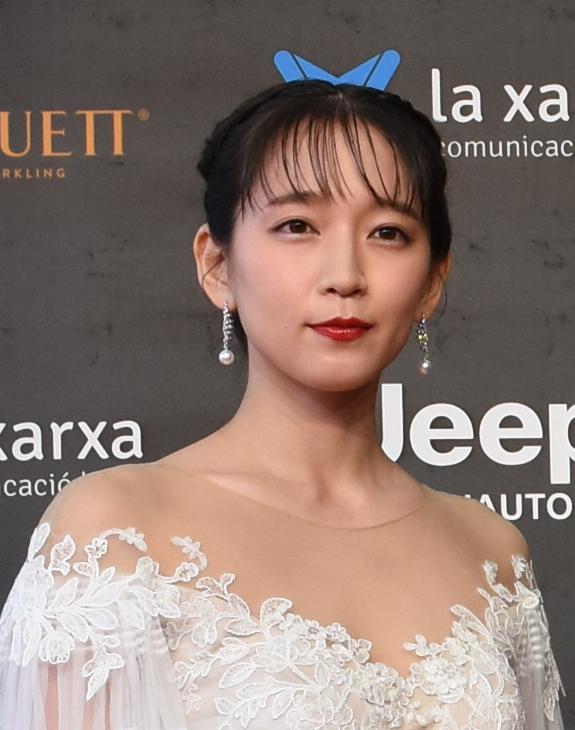
- Riho Yoshioka in 2019
- Born: January 15, 1993 (age 33); Ukyō-ku, Kyoto, Japan
- Occupation: Actress
- Years active: 2013–present
- Agent: FLaMme

Riho Yoshioka (吉岡 里帆, Yoshioka Riho; born January 15, 1993, in Kyoto) is a Japanese actress. She first attracted attention after landing a role in a television series, Here Comes Asa on NHK in 2016. She received the Elan d'or Award for Newcomer of the Year in 2018.

She won the Newcomer of the Year Award at the 43rd Japan Academy Film Prize for her role in the 2019 film Mienai Mokugeki-sha and Parallel World Love Story.

== Personal life ==
Her special skills are calligraphy and alto saxophone. She holds an 8th dan rank in calligraphy, which she began at age 7 after being invited by a friend. She continued to practice seriously throughout middle and high school, and went on to university with the aim of becoming a professional calligrapher. Inspired by the movie Swing Girls, she joined the brass band club during her school years and played the alto saxophone.

Her hobbies include playing with cats and watching Shinpa theater performances. While she loves all living creatures, she is particularly fond of cats, even writing in her blog 'I am severely cat-dependent'. Her family keeps five cats and one dog at her family home in Kyoto.

She is a gummy candy enthusiast and is an honorary member of the Japan Gummy Association.

== Filmography ==
=== Television ===
Year	Title	Role	Notes	Ref.
2015	Beauty and the Fellow	Karen Asakura		
2016	Here Comes Asa!	Nobu Tamura	Asadora	
2016	We're Millennials Got a Problem?	Etsuko Sakura		
2016	Medical Team: Lady Davinci no Shindan	Ayaka Tamaru		
2017	Quartet	Arisu Kisugi		
2017	I'm Sorry, I Love You	Rinka Mita		
2018	You Always Inhabit My Heart	Kyōko Ogawa	Lead role	
2018	Nemuri Kyoshirō The Final	Misao	Television film	
2018	Caseworker's Diary	Emiru Yoshitsune	Lead role	
2021	The Grand Family	Makiko Yasuda		
2022	Shizuka-chan and her Papa	Shizuka Nonomura	Lead role	
2022	Chair	Nana		
2022–25	Gannibal	Yūki Agawa	2 seasons	
2023	Sunset	Mahiro Kai	Miniseries	
2023	Scary Humans 2	Osome		
2023	Don't Use Time Travel for Love	Megu		
2024	House of Ninjas	Karen Ito		
2025	Mr. Mikami's Classroom	Fumika Kore'eda		
2025	Last Samurai Standing	Shino		
2025	Kowloon Generic Romance	Success (voice)	Cameo; animation	
2025	Hirayasumi	Yomogi Tachibana		
2026	Brothers in Arms	Chika	Taiga drama	
2027	Dangerous	Shigeko	Lead role	

=== Films ===
Year	Title	Role	Notes	Ref.
2015	Mango to Akai Kurumaisu	Chihiro		
2015	The Curtain Rises	Mai Murakami		
2015	Akegarasu	Akiko		
2016	Tsumugumono	Ryoka Sawai		
2016	Happy Wedding	Aiko Aikawa	Lead role	
2016	Star Sand	Shiho	Australian film	
2017	Detective Conan: Crimson Love Letter	Mikiko Hiramoto (voice)		
2018	Louder!: Can't Hear What You're Singin', Wimp	Fūka	Lead role	
2019	Parallel World Love Story	Mayuko Tsuno		
2019	Hot Gimmick: Girl Meets Boy	Rina Katsuragi		
2019	Her Blue Sky	Akane (voice)		
2019	Blind	Natsume Hamanaka	Lead role	
2020	Fukushima 50	Haruka		
2020	Any Crybabies Around?	Kotone		
2021	Zokki	Ryoko	Lead role	
2021	Fortune Favors Lady Nikuko	Miu (voice)		
2022	Anime Supremacy!	Hitomi Saitō	Lead role	
2022	xxxHolic	Jorōgumo		
2022	Shimamori	Rin Higa		
2023	Ice Cream Fever	Natsumi Tsuneda	Lead role	
2023	G-Men	Hitomi Amamiya		
2023	We're Millennials. Got a Problem?: The Movie	Etsuko Sakura		
2023	Lumberjack the Monster	Emi Hasumi		
2024	Maru	Yajima		
2024	Faceless	Sayaka Ando		
2024	At the Bench		Lead role; anthology film	
2025	Kowloon Generic Romance	Reiko Kujirai	Lead role	
2025	1st Kiss	Ritsu Tenma		
2025	Gosh!!	Ten-chan		
2025	Double Happiness		Cameo; Taiwanese film	
2026	Street Kingdom	Sachi		
2026	Shadow Work	Noriko	Lead role	
2026	Sukiyaki	Tetsuko Kuroyanagi		

=== Video games ===
Year	Title	Role	Notes	Ref.
2026	Professor Layton and the New World of Steam	Elinora Allinston, Elida Allinston (voice)		

=== Dubbing ===
- Transformers One (Elita)

=== Others ===
- 68th NHK Kōhaku Uta Gassen (2017), judge
- 62nd Japan Record Awards (2020), host
- 63rd Japan Record Awards (2021), host

== Awards and nominations ==
Year	Award	Category	Work(s)	Result	Ref.
2017	7th Confidence Award Drama Prizes	Best Newcomer	Quartet	Won	
2018	42nd Elan d'or Awards	Newcomer of the Year	Herself	Won	
2020	62nd Blue Ribbon Awards	Best Actress	Blind	Nominated	
2020	43rd Japan Academy Film Prize	Newcomer of the Year	Blind and Parallel World Love Story	Won	
2022	35th Nikkan Sports Film Awards	Best Actress	Anime Supremacy!	Nominated	
2023	44th Yokohama Film Festival	Best Actress	Anime Supremacy!	Won	
2023	46th Japan Academy Film Prize	Best Actress	Anime Supremacy!	Nominated	
2023	36th Nikkan Sports Film Awards	Best Supporting Actress	G-Men and others	Nominated	
2024	49th Hochi Film Awards	Best Supporting Actress	Faceless	Won	
2025	79th Mainichi Film Awards	Best Supporting Performance	Faceless	Nominated	
2025	67th Blue Ribbon Awards	Best Supporting Actress	Faceless, Maru, and At the Bench	Nominated	
2025	48th Japan Academy Film Prize	Best Supporting Actress	Faceless	Won	
