= Hideaki Takizawa =

Japanese businessman and former musician (born 1982)

- 滝沢秀明
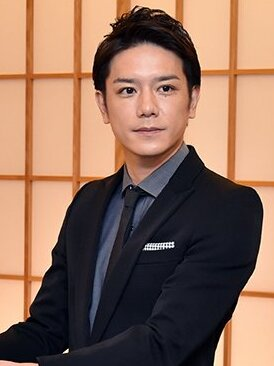
- Takizawa in 2017
- Born: March 29, 1982 (age 44); Hachiōji, Tokyo, Japan
- Other name: Tackey (タッキー)
- Occupation: Businessman
- Years active: 1995–2018; 2019–2022
- Musical career
- Genre: J-pop
- Label: Avex Trax
- Formerly of: Tackey & Tsubasa; Ken Tackey
- Website: avex.jp/tackeytsubasa/

Hideaki Takizawa (滝沢 秀明, Takizawa Hideaki; born 29 March 1982), also known professionally as Tackey (タッキー), is a Japanese businessman, record producer and former singer and actor. He is the president of the Japanese talent agency Tobe. Takizawa debuted as an actor in 1995, and in 2002, he made his musical debut as the duo Tackey & Tsubasa with Tsubasa Imai.

In 2018, Takizawa retired from entertainment and became the founder and president of Johnny's Island, a subdivision of Johnny & Associates, of which he oversaw the debuts of Snow Man and SixTones. In July 2019, he was made the vice president of Johnny & Associates, a position he held until he resigned in November 2022 to pursue other career ventures.

== Early years ==
Takizawa was born in Hachioji, Tokyo. He was the youngest of three siblings, had an older sister and an older brother. His parents divorced when he was very young and he grew up in poverty with his mother and siblings. After entering junior high school, he inquired about becoming a professional wrestler and contacted a professional wrestling organization, but was told he was not tall enough or heavy enough, so he gave up. His sister is a big fan of Koichi Domoto of KinKi Kids, and when she went to see a KinKi's concert and saw kids about Takizawa's age dancing as backup dancers, she encouraged him to audition. He sent his resume to the Johnny & Associates himself, and after an audition, he entered the Johnny & Associates in 1995 at the age of 13. Others who auditioned on the same day and joined Johnny's included Tsubasa Imai and Tomoyuki Yara.

== Career ==
=== 1995-2001 Before debut ===
Tsubasa Imai said of his impression of Takizawa when he first met him, "His eyes looked exceptionally serious, unlike the others." Takizawa became so popular as a trainee that he was described as the best trainee (Johnny's Jr.) and acted lead role in television series Majo no Jōken, The Sun Never Sets and Strawberry on the Shortcake even before his debut. In 1998, he had also hosted 8 Jida J, a variety show featuring Johnny's trainees.

He had been an assistant to Johnny Kitagawa as an interviewer at auditions since he was just 14 years old, shortly after he joined the company.

In 2002, He made CD debut with mini-album Hatachi as the duo Tackey & Tsubasa with Tsubasa Imai.

=== 2002-2018 Performing career ===
Takizawa worked mainly as an actor on TV and stage in addition to his activities as Tackey & Tsubasa after his debut.

He starred in many TV series after his debut, including Boku dake no Madonna, but his best-known work was the 2005 NHK Taiga Drama Yoshitsune. He played the lead role of Minamoto no Yoshitsune and became popular along with veteran actor Ken Matsudaira, who played Yoshitsune's famous follower Benkei.

He was also active on the stage, becoming the youngest director of a musical performance at various theaters, including Mask (1998) at the Osaka Shochikuza and Takizawa Enbujo (2006) at the Shinbashi Enbujo. In 2015, he held his first overseas performance Takizawa Kabuki 10th Anniversary in Singapore.

Takizawa Kabuki was Takizawa's signature stage series and was said to be a condensed version of the Japanese entertainment created by Johnny Kitagawa and Takizawa.

Takizawa Kabuki began in 2006 with its predecessor, Takizawa Enbujo, starring Takizawa. and since 2010, the theater has been changed to the Nissay Theater, where it has been performed as Takizawa Kabuki. Then until Takizawa retires from performing in 2018 and hands over the direction to Snow Man in 2023, Takizawa has starred in and produced Takizawa Kabuki, which was known as a place for many junior trainees to perform and gain stage experience.

In 2017, Takizawa starred in his first film role in Kodomo Tsukai.

In August 2017 he was appointed Japan-UAE goodwill ambassador by Taro Kono, the Minister of Foreign Affairs.

In September 2017, it was announced that he take a pause in his activities as Takky & Tsubasa.

In September 2018, it was announced that he would retire from performing at the end of the year to focus on producing. It was reported that this was because Johnny Kitagawa himself had appointed Takizawa as his successor. Takizawa had initially planned to work as a producer while continuing his entertainment career, but decided to retire from show business because he felt that he could not handle human life half-heartedly.

=== 2019-2022 As an executive at Johnny's ===
In January 2019, Takizawa became president of a new company, Johnny's Island, a production company for trainees at Johnny's. After the death of Johnny Kitagawa on July 9, 2019, Takizawa was appointed executive vice president of the Johnny & Associates on September 27 of the same year.

At Kitagawa's "family funeral" on July 12, Takizawa held a portrait of Kitagawa in front of his chest and sat in the passenger seat of the hearse. At this funeral, because Takizawa was in the position where Kitagawa's relatives would normally sit, and the close relationship between Kitagawa and Takizawa was brought to renewed attention by the tabloid magazines.

After the death of Johnny Kitagawa, Takizawa was sometimes called "Chi-sana Johnny-san" (Little Johnny) because he was the person who most inherited Kitagawa's ideas about entertainment and character development.

In August 2019, the trainees' concert was held at Tokyo Dome for the first time in 19 years. It was also the first time for Johnny's to offer the entire live concert on a pay-per-view basis.

Takizawa turned his attention to YouTube early on, opening his own channel "Taki Channel" in 2010. Takizawa's channel launch was unusual because the Johnny & Associates at the time had strict portrait rights management. In March 2018, an official channel was launched for trainees (Johnny's Jr.). To Takizawa's credit, it is said that the opening of this channel has made the trainees more widely known to the public.

In 2019, he produced a music video of trainee's group SixTones' new song "Japonica Style." It was released on YouTube, was Takizawa's first produced work and was praised as a groundbreaking piece that incorporated Japanese elements with a cool atmosphere.

Takizawa is said to have trained trainee members of Snow Man for his theatre production Takizawa Kabuki series. Some of the Snow Man members have appeared in this stage performance series since the beginning, and in 2012, in Takizawa Kabuki 2012, the formation of a six-member Snow Man was announced, named by Takizawa. Furthermore, in 2019, the production was renamed Takizawa Kabuki Zero and the lead actor was changed Takizawa to Snow Man. Takizawa continued to produce the stage performances, and Snow Man made a new start as a nine-member group with the addition of Ren Meguro, Koji Mukai, and Raul from the previous six-member group. The play was also made into a movie in 2020.

In 2020, Snow Man and SixTones debuted at the same time for the first time since the passing of Johnny Kitagawa. This was reportedly a decision Takizawa and Kitagawa discussed and decided on June 16, 2019, two days before Kitagawa fell ill from a subarachnoid hemorrhage.

On October 31, 2022, it was announced that Takizawa had departed from Johnny's. Upon hearing of his intention to quit, the company persuaded him not to resign, but finally they respected Takizawa's firm intention to move on to the next stage of his career and allowed him to leave.

=== 2023 Independent, as a president of Tobe ===
On March 21, 2023, Takizawa announced on his Twitter Space that he was creating a new talent agency Tobe. He became president.

Many artists who used to belong to Johnny's transferred to Tobe during 2023. Among them, Sho Hirano, Yuta Jinguji, and Yuta Kishi, who left King & Prince to form the new group Number_i, caught the most attention. Their YouTube live-streaming by Number_i on October 15 received a sizable response and was viewed by 670,000 people.

In March 14 to 17 2024, a joint concert to HEROes: Tobe 1st Super Live by all the artists in the group was held at Tokyo Dome. On the 21st of the same month, Takizawa made a comment as the first year of the company's establishment. "We are confident that we will continue to do more than you can imagine. We are still small as a company, but we want to be dynamic in what we do. Dreams are not something to be seen, they are something to be fulfilled,” he said, expressing his determination.

On February 6, 2025, Takizawa was announced as director of the opening ceremony for IG Arena in Aichi. The event is scheduled for March 31.

== Personal life ==
In November 2022, Takizawa retired from Johnny's, and in his Twitter profile he described himself as an adventurer. On November 10, he wrote being in the Danakil Desert in eastern Africa and noted that the temperature was over 50 Celsius (323 K). Takizawa is said he has a hobby of volcanic exploration. According to a December 2022 report, four of the world's five largest lava lakes have already been explored, and he hopes to explore the remaining volcano, Mount Erebus in Antarctica.

== Discography ==
=== Singles ===
Title	Year	Peaks		Sales
Title	Year	JPN (Note: Sources for chart positions are as follows: "Ai Kakumei", "Sha La La / Mugen no Hane", "Hikari Hitotsu".)	JPN Hot. (Note: Sources for chart positions are as follows: "Ai Kakumei", "Sha La La / Mugen no Hane", "Hikari Hitotsu".)	Sales
"Ai・Kakumei" (愛・革命)	2009	1	2	72,000
"Sha La La" (シャ・ラ・ラ)	2009	1	4	53,000
"Mugen no Hane" (無限の羽)	2009	1	81	53,000
"Hikari Hitotsu" (ヒカリひとつ)	2009	1	3	54,000
"Anata Dake ni Ima Utau Kono Uta" (あなただけに今歌うこの詩) (Note: Digital single.)	2014	–	–	
"–" denotes a recording that did not chart or was not released in that territory.

== Filmography ==
=== Film ===
Year	Title	Role	Director	Notes
1995	The Cure	Erik	Peter Horton	Voice role
2000	Kawa no Nagare no Yō ni	Akira Hamamoto	Yasushi Akimoto	
2017	Kodomo Tsukai	Kodomo Tsukai	Takashi Shimizu	Lead role

=== Television drama ===
Year	Title	Role	Network	Notes
1995–1996	Thursday Ghost Stories: Kaiki Club	Noboru Akahoshi	Fuji TV	Lead role, 2 seasons (39 episodes)
1996	Dareka ga Dareka ni Koishiteru	Oyaji (handle)	TBS	Television special
1996	The Chef	Unknown	NTV	Episode: "The Best X-mas Dinner Confrontation Ever... Ajizawa dies"
1997	Thursday Ghost Stories: Time Keepers	Rentarō Satonaka	Fuji TV	Lead role (10 episodes)
1998	News no Onna	Ryū Kitahara	Fuji TV	Main role (11 episodes)
1998	Kokoro no Tobira	Yū Hase	Nippon TV	Lead role, television special for 24 Hour Television
1999	Nekketsu Renai Dō	Friday Takizawa	Nippon TV	Main role (17 episodes)
1999	Genroku Ryōran	Yoshichika Kira	NHK	Taiga drama
1999	Majo no Jōken	Hikaru Kurosawa	TBS	Lead role with Nanako Matsushima (11 episodes)
1999	Ppoi		NTV	Drama navigator
1999	Shin Oretachi no Tabi Ver. 1999	Skirt-chasing passerby	NTV	Episode: "Scoring Girls and Finding Employment! President is Amazed"
2000	The Sun Never Sets	Nao Masaki	Fuji TV	Lead role (11 episodes)
2001	Strawberry on the Shortcake	Manato Irie	TBS	Lead role (10 episodes)
2001	Speed Star	Shō Mikage	NTV	Lead role
2001	Antique Bakery	Eiji Kanda	Fuji TV	Lead role (7 episodes)
2002	Season of the Sun	Tatsuya Tsugawa	TBS	Lead role (11 episodes)
2003	Boku dake no Madonna	Kyōichi Suzuki	Fuji TV	Lead role (11 episodes)
2004	Chichi no Umi, Boku no Sora	Kyōhei Hayakawa	NTV	Lead role, television special for 24 Hour Television
2005	Yoshitsune	Minamoto no Yoshitsune	NHK	Lead role, taiga drama
2006	Satomi Hakkenden	Inuzuka Shino Moritaka	TBS	Lead role, television special (2 episodes)
2007	Romeo and Juliet Off-topic	Hiromichi Morita	NTV	Lead role, television special
2007	Kimi ga Kureta Natsu	Masato Kizaki	NTV	Lead role, television special for 24 Hour Television
2008	An Actor's Revenge	Yukinojō Nakamura/Yamitarō	NHK	Lead role, New Year's television special
2008	Kokuchisezu	Ryō Hasegawa	TV Asahi	Lead role, TV Asahi's 50th Anniversary television special
2009	Orthros no Inu	Shinji Ryūzaki	TBS	Lead role (9 episodes)
2009	Akutō	Shūichi Saeki	Fuji TV	Lead role, television special
2013	Mayonaka no Panya-san	Yōsuke Kurebayashi	NHK BS P	Lead role (8 episodes)
2014	Nezumi, Edo o Hayaru	Jirokichi	NHK	Lead role (8 episodes)
2014	Hamu: Public Security Police Man	Shinji Natsuhara	Fuji TV	Lead role, television special
2016	Nezumi, Edo o Hayaru 2	Jirokichi	NHK	Lead role (8 episodes)
2016	Seisei Suruhodo, Aishiteru	Kairi Miyoshi	TBS	Lead role (10 episodes)
2018	Kazoku no Tabiji	Yūsuke Asari	Tokai TV	Lead role (8 episodes)
2019	A Lone Scalpel	Tetsuhiko Toma	Wowow	Lead role (8 episodes)

== Songs written by Tackey ==
- Words of Love
- Everlasting Love
- 894...Hakushi
- Madonna (for DreamBoy musical in 2004)
- Futari no Yoru
- My Angel, You are Angel (for KAT-TUN; released in Cartoon KAT-TUN II You album 2007)
- Fight All Night (for KAT-TUN; for DreamBoy musical in 2004; released in Cartoon KAT-TUN II You album 2007)
- Da.ke.do
- Jūnigatsu no Hana
- With Love
- Ai.Kakumei
- Mugen no Hane
- Monster
