= King & Prince (album) =

- Standard Edition Cover

Studio album by King & Prince
- Released: June 19, 2019
- Recorded: 2018–2019
- Genre: J-pop
- Length: 69:25
- Languages: Japanese, English
- Label: Johnny's Universe

King & Prince album chronology
King & Prince (2019)	L& (2020)

Singles from King & Prince
- 1. "Cinderella Girl" Released: May 23, 2018; 2. "Memorial" Released: October 10, 2018; 3. "Kimi no Matteru" Released: April 3, 2019

King & Prince is the debut studio album from Japanese pop group King & Prince, released on June 19, 2019, by Johnny's Universe. It was the group's first full release following the merging of the two individual units, Mr. King and Mr. Prince.

== Background and release ==
King & Prince's debut studio album was announced on May 17, 2019, alongside a full track listing, product details and its official release date. The album features three previously released singles; "Cinderella Girl," "Memorial," and "Kimi no Matteru."

The album was released physically on June 19, 2019, in three different versions. The Standard Edition, originally priced at ¥3000, featured a poster as well as bonus track "King & Prince, Queen & Princess." Limited Edition A included an exclusive bonus DVD, featuring three different music videos for the track "Naughty Girl;" the original music video, the Solo Member version, and a dance practise version. The DVD also included a behind-the-scenes video for the filming of the music videos, and a video were members discussed their thoughts and future plans with the group. Limited Edition B included an exclusive bonus CD, which featured both tracks made under their former alias Mr. King vs. Mr. Prince, three tracks from their individual sub-units Mr. King and Mr. Prince, as well as three new bonus tracks titled "Hello!!" "Katsunda WIN!" and "MIXTURE." Both Limited Editions were originally priced at ¥3600.

It was the final release from the group to feature vocals from Genki Iwahashi, being released seven months into his hiatus. He eventually departed from the group in 2021 after more than two years of inactivity.

== Commercial performance ==
King & Prince debuted at number one on Oricon's Singles Chart for the week ending June 23, 2019. The album spent a total of 133 weeks on the chart, making it their longest charting album. The album placed at number two on Oricon's annual album chart for the year of 2019, ranking behind only 5x20 All the Best!! 1999–2019 by Arashi. The album has also sold over 600,000 copies, and was verified as double platinum by the Recording Industry Association of Japan in June 2019.

== Track listing ==
No.	Title	Length
1.	"Cinderella Girl (シンデレラガール)"	4:12
2.	"Sha-la-la Hajikeru Love (Sha-la-la ハジける Love"	4:09
3.	"Kimi o Matteru (君を待ってる)"	4:40
4.	"Naughty Girl"	3:31
5.	"Can't Stop Now"	3:38
6.	"Mahoroba (マホロバ)"	3:32
7.	"Betsubetsu no Sora (別々の空)"	3:56
8.	"Moon Lover"	4:31
9.	"FEEL LIKE GOLD"	4:06
10.	"Big Bang"	3:37
11.	"Dance with me"	3:20
12.	"Super Duper Crazy"	3:43
13.	"Memorial"	4:48
14.	"Letter"	3:55
15.	"Song for you (君を信じて)"	3:49
16.	"Thank You (君に ありがとう)"	4:32
17.	"King & Prince, Queen & Princess" (Exclusive to Standard Edition)	5:26
Total length:		69:25

Limited Edition B Bonus CD
No.	Title	Length
1.	"Summer Station (サマー・ステーション)"	3:48
2.	"Hello!!"	2:52
3.	"Katsunda WIN! (勝つんだWIN!)"
4.	"MIXTURE"
5.	"Bounce to Night"	2:58
6.	"OH! Summer King (OH!サマーKING)"
7.	"Alright"
8.	"THE DREAM BOYS"
9.	"Prince Pincess"
10.	"You Are My Princess"
11.	"Egaita Mirai (Tadoritsuku Made) (描いた未来〜たどり着くまで〜)"

Tracks 6, 7, and 8 on CD2 are performed by only Sho Hirano, Ren Nagase, and Kaito Takahashi, under the alias Mr. King.

Tracks 9, 10, and 11 on CD2 are performed by only Yuta Kishi, Yuta Jinguji, and Genki Iwahashi, under the alias Prince.

== Charts ==
=== Weekly charts ===
Chart performance for King & Prince
Chart (2019)	Peak position
Japan Oricon Albums Chart	1
Billboard Japan Hot Albums	1

=== Year-end charts ===
Year-end chart performance for King & Prince
Chart (2019)	Position
Japan Oricon Albums Chart	2
Worldwide Albums	18

== Awards and nominations ==
Year	Award	Category	Nominee / Work	Result	Ref.
2018	97th Television Drama Academy Awards	Best Theme Song	"Cinderella Girl"	Nominated	
2019	2019 MPA Awards	Hit Song Award	"Cinderella Girl"	Won	
2019	34th Japan Gold Disc Awards	Best 5 Albums	King & Prince	Won	
