= IMP (band) =

Japanese boy band

IMP.
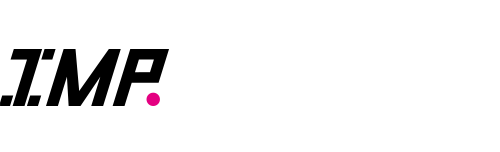
- Logo of IMP.

Background information
- Also known as: Impactors (2020–2023)
- Origin: Tokyo, Japan
- Genres: J-pop
- Years active: 2020–present
- Label: Tobe Music
- Members: Arata Sato; Shunsuke Motoi; Taiga Suzuki; Takuya Kageyama; Minato Matsui; Yuki Yokohara; Taiga Tsubaki
- Website: Official website

IMP (アイエムピー, Ai emu pi), formerly known as Impactors (stylized as IMPACTors), is a Japanese boy band associated with Tobe. They made their official debut on 18 August 2023 with the digital release of their first single "Cruisin'".

The group colors are black and magenta pink, and the "." (dot) at the end of the group name is written in pink, such as "IMP. ".

== History ==
The group was formed on 16 October 2020, as part of Johnny & Associates' Johnny's Jr. as Impactors, the name given by Hideaki Takizawa. The name IMPACTors comes from the combination of "Impact" meaning "shock" and "Actors" meaning "to make an impact on the world", "to leave a shock and a legend behind". "Impact" is written in black, representing "coolness", while "ors" is written in pink, representing "transience and mystery", with the meaning "just as there is pink in black, show your different sides as well". The group left the agency on May 25, 2023.

On July 14, 2023, they announced on a YouTube livestream that they would be joining entertainment company Tobe, founded by Takizawa, and restarting the group under the group name "IMP.". A fan club was also established, and official social network accounts were opened on Instagram and Twitter at 8 pm that same day.

On August 11, 2023, the group announced the digital single "Cruisin'" would be released worldwide on August 18, publishing a teaser video at 7 pm on the same day. On August 12, the fan base name was decided to continue to be "PINKY.", as it had been named previously. A YouTube regular program for the group started on August 16, with updates on Mondays and Wednesdays.

The music video for "Cruisin'", released on YouTube on August 18, 2023, gained 2.01 million views in the first day after its release, and rose to second place in the music category of the rapidly increasing popularity ranking. It was ranked first in the number of downloads on the Oricon Weekly Digital Single Ranking and Billboard Japan Download Songs.

On September 15, 2023, their second digital single, "IMP.", was released, and on October 13, 2023, their third digital single, "Switching", was released.

On November 8, 2023, the group's first CD single, "Cruisin'/IMP.", which includes both songs "Cruisin'" and "IMP.", was produced and released exclusively on Tobe’s online store.

On December 8, they released their fourth digital single, "I Got It".

On March 8, 2024, they released their fifth digital single "Flow". On March 12, all songs from the first single "Cruisin' / IMP." and second single "Switching / I Got It" were distributed. Until now, the title song of each single had been released online, but this marked the first time that the coupling songs were released online.

On May 29, 2024, they released their first album, Departure.

On March 9, 2025, it was announced that the group would star in Takizawa's stage production Impact. This work, which was performed at the Misonoza Theater in Nagoya from May 1, followed by Kanazawa and Hiroshima, is IMP.'s first leading role on stage.

== Members ==
- Arata Sato (佐藤 新)
- Shunsuke Motoi (基 俊介)
- Taiga Suzuki (鈴木 大河)
- Takuya Kageyama (影山 拓也) – leader
- Minato Matsui (松井 奏)
- Yuki Yokohara (横原 悠毅)
- Taiga Tsubaki (椿 泰我)

== Discography ==
=== Album ===
	Release date	Title	Form	Product ID	Label	Notes	Rank
1	May 29, 2024	Departure	First production limited edition A	TBCT0732X	Tobe Music	Includes limited edition jacket type A, 32-page lyric booklet.	n/a
1	May 29, 2024	Departure	First production limited edition B	TBCT0733X	Tobe Music	Includes limited edition jacket type B, 32-page lyric booklet.	n/a
1	May 29, 2024	Departure	Standard edition	TBCT0734	Tobe Music	Includes regular edition jacket, 24-page lyric booklet	n/a
2	December 15, 2025	MAGenter	Bulk edition (First production limited edition A + First production limited edition B + Standard edition)	n/a	Tobe Music	Bulk purchase editions include key charm, shaker charm or beads charm	n/a
2	December 15, 2025	MAGenter	First production limited edition A CD+Blu-ray	TBCT0769X	Tobe Music	Includes limited edition jacket type A + slipcase + 32-page lyric booklet	n/a
2	December 15, 2025	MAGenter	First production limited edition B CD+Blu-ray	TBCT0770X	Tobe Music	Includes limited edition jacket type B + slipcase + 32-page lyric booklet	n/a
2	December 15, 2025	MAGenter	Standard edition CD	TBCT0771	Tobe Music	Includes regular edition jacket + 24-page lyric booklet	n/a

=== Singles ===
==== CD single ====
	Release date	Title	Form	Standard product board	Label	Rank	Notes
1st	November 8, 2023	Cruisin'/IMP.	First production limited edition A (CD + Blu-ray)	TBCT0714X	Tobe Music		Includes limited edition jacket type A, 24-page lyric booklet. BR includes "Cruisin'" and "IMP." MV Director's cut
1st	November 8, 2023	Cruisin'/IMP.	First production limited edition B (CD + Blu-ray)	TBCT0715X	Tobe Music		Includes limited edition jacket type B, 24-page lyric booklet. BR includes "Cruisin'" and "IMP." MV "Behind the scenes"
1st	November 8, 2023	Cruisin'/IMP.	Regular edition (CD)	TBCT0716	Tobe Music		Includes regular edition jacket, 12-page lyric booklet.
2nd	February 21, 2024	SWITCHing/I got it	First production limited edition A (CD + Blu-ray)	TBCT0720X	Tobe Music		Includes limited edition jacket type A, 24-page lyric booklet. BR content to be decided
2nd	February 21, 2024	SWITCHing/I got it	First production limited edition B (CD + Blu-ray)	TBCT0721X	Tobe Music		Includes limited edition jacket type A, 24-page lyric booklet. BR content to be decided
2nd	February 21, 2024	SWITCHing/I got it	Regular edition (CD)	TBCT0722	Tobe Music		Includes regular edition jacket, 12-page lyric booklet

==== Distribution limited single ====
	Release date	Title	Form	Rank	Label	First recorded album
1st	August 18, 2023	Cruisin'	digital download	First place	Tobe Music	Not included in album
2nd	September 15, 2023	IMP.	digital download	2nd place	Tobe Music	Not included in album
3rd	October 13, 2023	SWITCHing	digital download	2nd place	Tobe Music	Not included in album
4th	December 8, 2023	I Got It	digital download		Tobe Music	Not included in album
5th	March 8, 2024	FLOW	digital download		Tobe Music	Not included in album

=== Impactors original songs ===
Title	JASRAC work code	Ref.
Top Of The World	1P0-3471-0	
Wildfire	1P4-6310-6	
Fighter	1Q8-7517-3	
Cool Don't Lie	1Q8-9809-2	

== Filmography ==
=== Television ===
- Best Artist (December 2, 2023, Nippon TV)
- The Most Listened Songs of the Year - Annual Music Awards 2023 (December 27, 2023, Nippon TV)
- CDTV Live! Live! New Year’s Eve Special! 2023→2024 (December 31, 2023, TBS TV)
- MUSIC FAIR (February 10th, 2024, Fuji TV)
- Venue101 (May 25th, 2024, NHK General)
- CDTV Live! Live! (May 27th, 2024, TBS TV)
- Weekly Ninety-Nine Music (June 5th, 2024, Fuji TV )
- with Music (June 15, 2024, Nippon TV)
- Tobe Live at Ariake Arena: Imp. Departures (August 15, 2024, Amazon Prime Video, episode 4)

=== Radio ===
Year(s)	Title	Ref.
2024–present	IMP.'s IMPickup	

== Live performances ==
=== Concerts ===
- Johnnys' Jr. Island FES (November 28th and 29th, 2020, paid live streaming)
- Johnny's Ginza 2021 Tokyo Experience (May 24-30, 2021, Theater Creation)
- Summer Paradise 2021 (August 20-30, 2021, Tokyo Dome City Hall)
- Summer Paradise 2022 (August 19-30, 2022, Tokyo Dome City Hall)
- East and West Johnny's Jr. Spring Paradise (March 7-12, 2023, Osaka Shochikuza / May 22-25, Nihonbashi Mitsui Hall)
- to HEROes ~Tobe1st Super Live~ (March 14-17, 2024 Tokyo Dome)
- Departure (June 13, 2024 (2 performances), June 14, 2024 (1 performance) Ariake Arena)

=== Event ===
- 35th Mynavi Tokyo Girls Collection 2022 Autumn/WInter
- D.U.N.K. Showcase in Kyocera Dome Osaka (December 2, 2023, Kyocera Dome Osaka)
- Chengdu Strawberry Music Festival (April 21, 2024, Chengdu, China, Chengdu Intangible Cultural Heritage Creative Industry Park)
- JAPAN JAM 2024 (April 29, 2024, Soga Sports Park, Chiba City)

=== Stage ===
- Takizawa Kabuki Zero 2021 (April 8 - May 16, 2021, Shinbashi Enbujo / June 2 - 27, Misonoza)
- Tora-Ja Ninjapan 2021 (October 6-28, 2021, Minamiza / November 3-27, Shinbashi Enbujo / December 1-8, Misonoza / December 11-12, Hiroshima Bunka Gakuen HBG Hall)
- Takizawa Kabuki Zero 2022 (April 6 - May 16, 2022, Shinbashi Enbujo)
