= Yuta Jinguji =

Japanese singer and actor (born 1997)

Yūta Jinguuji
- 神宮寺勇太
- Born: 30 October 1997 (age 28); Chiba Prefecture, Japan
- Occupations: Singer; actor; television personality
- Years active: 2010–present
- Agent: Tobe
- Musical career
- Genres: J-pop
- Labels: Johnny's Universe; Tobe Music
- Member of: Number_i
- Formerly of: Sexy Boyz; King & Prince

Yūta Jinguuji (神宮寺勇太), Professionally known as Jin, born in Chiba Prefecture on October 30, 1997, is a Japanese singer, idol, actor and TV personality, belonging to Tobe, member of J-pop boy-band Number_i, former member of Johnny & Associates's group King & Prince.

== Early career and Junior era ==
Wanting to experience something unique, Jinguuji bought a resume sheet at a 100-yen store and applied to join Johnny & Associates when he was in junior high school. Jinguuji was admitted on his birthday in 2010.

In 2012, Jinguuji joined the Nippon Television drama Sprout, debuting as an actor.

On May 5, 2014, as a Junior member, he was chosen as part of Sexy Zone's Junior unit Sexy Boyz.

On June 5, 2015, he became an official supporter of TV Asahi's event "TV Asahi Roppongi Hills Summer Festival SUMMER STATION" in the group "Mr.King vs Mr.Prince", as part of its subunit "Prince". The group continued activities together, performing the theme song from the event.

== King & Prince Era ==
On May 23, 2018, "Mr.King vs Mr.Prince", now as King & Prince, made their CD debut.

On November 4, 2022, it was announced that Sho Hirano, Yuta Kishi and Jinguuji would leave King & Prince and the agency. They left the group on May 22, 2023, with Hirano and Jinguuji leaving the agency that same day, while Kishi remained in the agency until later that year due to still having pending work.

== Tobe and Number_i ==
On July 7, 2023, Hirano and Jinguuji appeared together in a YouTube video, announcing their affiliation with TOBE, an entertainment agency launched by former Johnny & Associates artist and former vice president Hideaki Takizawa. On October 15, it was revealed that Kishi would also join Tobe, and that the three would form the new group Number i.

In November 2024, Jinguuji announced a partnership with Mikimoto, visiting the flagship store in New York, and attending a gala with different celebrities to celebrate the Mikimoto Chrome Hearts collaboration. He had appeared before in another collaboration with them in Paris.

On February 3, 2025, Jinguji was appointed as Givenchy Beauty brand ambassador.

On January 9, 2026, it was announced that Jinguji was appointed as Amiri's new global ambassador. Regarding his appointment as ambassador, Jinguji commented, "Fashion is a passion of mine, and also a powerful means of communication as a performer. Style is always a reflection of who I am, a way to express my individuality, creativity, and identity. I am very much looking forward to working alongside Amiri, a brand I have loved dearly, and Mike Amiri, whom I respect, as a global ambassador."

== Personal life ==
Jinguuji is a motorcycle hobbyist and owns three Harley-Davidson vehicles.

== Filmography ==
=== TV dramas ===
Year	Title	Role	Notes	Ref.
2012	Sprout	Wataru Katagiri		
2013	Kasukana Kanojo	Takuto Aida		
2013	49	Satoshi Inoue		
2014	SHARK ~2nd Season~	Reo Azuma		
2015	Youth Detective Haruya	Shota Miyazawa	Episode 5	
2018	Bukatsu, Suki Janakya Dame Desu ka?	Kubota		

== Musical contributions ==
- "INZM" (produced the track)

== Solo appearances ==
- Mikimoto
  - Paris Haute Couture Week "The Bows" collection unveiling (June 25, 2024)
  - Mikimoto Chrome Hearts collaboration, Mikimoto boutique in New York. (November 2024)
- Moto GP Japan 2024 (chequered flag waver)

== Magazines ==
- GQ Japan (December 2023 cover)
