= Detective Novice =

- Also known as: Miman Keisatsu: Midnight Runner
- (未満警察 ミッドナイトランナー)
- Genre: Action, suspense
- Written by: Yūsuke Watanabe
- Directed by: Seiichi Nagumo
- Starring: Kento Nakajima; Sho Hirano
- Opening theme: "Mazy Night" by King & Prince
- Ending theme: "Run" by Sexy Zone
- Composer: Hideaki Kimura
- Country of origin: Japan
- Original language: Japanese
- No. of seasons: 1
- No. of episodes: 10

Production
- Executive producer: Kenji Ikeda
- Producers: Naoto Fujimura; Masahiro Mori; Kuniko Yanagiuchi
- Running time: 54 minutes
- Production company: Nippon Television

Original release
- Network: Nippon Television
- Release: June 27 – August 29, 2020

Detective Novice (Japanese: 未満警察 ミッドナイトランナー, Hepburn: Miman Keisatsu: Midnight Runner) is a Japanese action suspense drama starring Kento Nakajima and Sho Hirano. It was first scheduled to broadcast on April 11, 2020 on Nippon Television, but was postponed until June 27 of the same year due to the COVID-19 outbreak delaying the filming. The drama is a remake of a 2017 South Korean film, Midnight Runners.

== Plot ==
The story revolves on two best friends who are cadets at a police academy, the "nerd" Kai Honma (Nakajima) and the "jock" Jiro Ichinose (Hirano). They solve cases that appears while making use of the knowledge that they acquire while studying at the academy.

== Cast ==
- Kento Nakajima as Kai Honma (本間 快, Honma Kai), a 24 years old university graduate who quits his first job and decided to follows his childhood dream as a hero. He is the type who carefully thinks before taking an action. His name is a play on words on a kansai accent expression, "honma kai?!" (seriously?!).
- Sho Hirano as Jiro Ishinose (一ノ瀬 次郎, Ichinose Jirō), Kai's roommate who is an exact opposite of Kai; someone who takes action before actually thinking. He had an older brother who wanted to be a police officer, and decided to take his place instead.
- Michiko Kichise as Ranko Oikawa (及川 蘭子, Oikawa Ranko), Kai and Jiro's strict assistant teacher who teach practical skills such as self defence and physical training.
- Yuri Nakamura as Yui Inanishi (稲西 結衣, Inanishi Yui)
- Taizo Harada as Shinpei Yanagida (柳田 晋平, Yanagida Shinpei)
- Yūsuke Iseya as Yuzuru Katanozaka (片野坂 譲, Katanozaka Yuzuru)

=== Guest cast ===
- Youko Maki as Megu (ep 01)
- Mone Kamishiraishi as Ami (ep 02, 03)
- Masaya Katō as Shibamoto (ep 02, 03)
- Shugo Oshinari as Yubisuke Yubitomo (ep 04)
- Misako Renbutsu as Rinka Mochizuki (ep 05)
- Dori Sakurada as Shiraki (ep 05)
- Tsutomu Takahashi as Detective Maruhashi (ep 05)
- Jouji Shibue as Detective Konpon (ep 05)
- Kyoko Hasegawa as Naoko Tenma (ep 06–07)
- Hayato Kakizawa as Tomoya Tenma (ep 06–07)
- Houka Kinoshita as Police Commander Kunieda (ep 06–07, 09–10)
- Satoru Matsuo as Seiji Nonomura (ep 08)
- Ginpunchō as Reiko Nonomura (ep 08)
- Hannya as Kato (ep 08)
- Kazuma Yamane as Detective Sunaoka (ep 09–10)
- Mayuko Nishiyama as Harumi (ep 10)
- Mao as Kamio Mai (ep 10)

== Episodes ==
| No. | Title | Original release date | Viewers (Kanto region) |
|---|---|---|---|
| 1 | "Teashi ni Yakedo no Yōna Ato ga Aru Shōjo Mi Ku ga, Tasuke o Motomete Kōban ni Yattekuru. (手足に火傷のような跡がある少女・みくが、助けを求めて交番にやって来る。)" | June 27, 2020 | 11.2% |
| 2 | "Toaru Hai Biru no Isshitsu de, Wakai Josei Rika ga Beddo no Ue ni Kōsoku Sareteiru. (とある廃ビルの一室で、若い女性・里佳がベッドの上に拘束されている。)" | July 4, 2020 | 9.0% |
| 3 | "誘拐された家出少女・亜未の行方を追い、監禁場所を突き止めた本間快と一ノ瀬次郎。" | July 11, 2020 | 8.4% |
| 4 | "ある日の夜、寮の部屋では、本間快と一ノ瀬次郎がスマホで恋愛映画を見ていた。" | July 18, 2020 | 7.2% |
| 5 | "ある日の夜、覚せい剤の売人グループを逮捕するため、刑事の丸橋(高橋努)、根本(渋江譲二)らは閉店したクラブのVIPルームに足を踏み入れていた。" | July 26, 2020 | 9.4% |
| 6 | "とある公園で、女性の遺体が発見される。監視カメラの映像には、犯人の男が逃走する姿が映っていた…。" | August 1, 2020 | 9.9% |
| 7 | "警察学校の教室で、本間快、一ノ瀬次郎、助教の及川蘭子の3人を人質にとった立てこもり事件が発生…。" | August 8, 2020 | 9.1% |
| 8 | "本間快と一ノ瀬次郎は交番での実務実習の日を迎えるが、そんな折、制服警官が襲われ拳銃を奪われる事件が発生…。" | August 15, 2020 | 9.3% |
| 9 | "9年前の連続猟奇殺人の真犯人を突き止めようとした本間と一ノ瀬の部屋の窓に不審なメッセージが書かれる…。" | August 22, 2020 | 9.7% |
| 10 | "橘冬美が持っていた古い携帯電話の映像ファイルには、幾つもの衝撃の場面が写っていた…。" | August 29, 2020 | 11% |

| Preceded by Top Knife; December 26, 2019 – March 14, 2020 | Nippon TV Saturday Dramas; Saturday 22:00 – 22:54 (JST); 2019-2020 | Succeeded by A Girl of 35; October 10, 2020 – December 12, 2020 |
