= Arata Sato =

Japanese idol, singer, actor and tarento

- 佐藤 新
- Born: 1 September 2000 (age 26); Tokyo, Japan
- Occupations: Singer; actor
- Years active: 2016–present
- Agent: Tobe
- Musical career
- Genres: J-pop
- Label: Tobe Music
- Member of: IMP.
- Website: https://tobe-official.jp/artists/imp

Arata Sato (佐藤新, Arata Sato; born September 1, 2000), is a Japanese actor and singer. He is an artist affiliated with Tobe. He is a member of the male idol group IMP. He is from Tokyo.

== History ==
Arata Sato joined Johnny & Associates on April 13, 2016 after auditioning.His contemporaries include Hidaka Ukisho, Yuto Nasu, and Nao Oriyama.

On "Music Station 2 Hours Special" broadcast on October 16, 2020, the formation of IMPACTors, a seven-member unit within Johnny's Jr. including Arata Sato, was announced. Since then, he has been active as a member of the IMPACTors and served as the group's center.

He left Johnny & Associates on May 25, 2023. On July 14, all members of the former IMPACTors joined Tobe and announced on a YouTube livestream that they would be renaming the group IMP. and making a fresh start. Sato will continue to serve as the group's center.

== Filmography ==
=== TV program ===
- Kusadeka (January 9, 2021 - March 18, 2023, TV Shizuoka)

=== TV drama ===
- Chito: Sagishi No Minasan Gochui Kudasai Episode 2 (2019) - Naoto Sano
- The High School Heroes Episodes 7 and 8 (2021) - Kageki Gota
- Takara-kun to Amagi-kun (2022) - Shun Takara
- Silent (2022) - Riku Tabata

=== Movie ===
- Takizawa Kabuki ZERO 2020 The Movie (2020)
- Every Trick in the Book (2021) - Role of Tanaka
- As Long as We Both Shall Live (2023) - Toya Mochizuki
- Seishun Gestalt Houkai (2025) - Hijiri Asahina

=== Stage ===
- Takizawa Kabuki ZERO (April 10 - May 19, 2019, Shinbashi Enbujo)
- Toraja -NINJAPAN- (November 2–20, 2019, Sunshine Theater / November 15–24, Minamiza / November 26th and 27th, Misonoza / November 30, Ueno Gakuen Hall) - Role of Hayabusa
- Toraja -NINJAPAN 2020 (October 10–27, 2020, Shinbashi Enbujo)
- Living in the Now (January 16–31, 2021, New National Theater / February 11–14, Sankei Hall Breeze / February 20 and 21, Tokai Arts Theater Large Hall) - Todd Anderson role
