= Number i =

Japanese boy band

Number_i
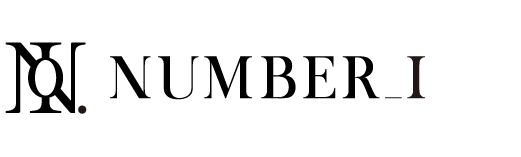
- Logo of Number_i

Background information
- Origin: Tokyo, Japan
- Genres: J-pop, Hip-hop, R&B
- Years active: 2023–present
- Labels: Tobe; Atlantic
- Members: Sho Hirano; Yuta Kishi; Yuta Jinguji
- Website: Official website

Number_i (ナンバーアイ; pronounced [nambaː ai]) is a Japanese boy band associated with Tobe, formed in October 2023. The group is formed by Sho Hirano, Yuta Jinguji, and Yuta Kishi.

== History ==
=== 2023: Formation ===
The now three former members of Johnny & Associates' King & Prince, left the group on May 22, 2023. Hirano and Jinguji cut ties with the agency that same day, while Kishi left on September 30, 2023.

On July 7, 2023, Hirano and Jinguji announced on a YouTube livestream their new affiliation to Tobe co., Ltd, established by Hideaki Takizawa. Kishi's announcement that he now belonged to Tobe Co., Ltd was done on a YouTube livestream on October 15, 2023, and also included the news about the formation of Number_i.

Kishi came up with "Number_i" and Hirano and Jinguji agreed with the group name. The "i" stands for Number One and Only One, signifying the aim to be number one, as well as the importance of the journey to get there. It also stands for love, "愛" in Japanese, and I (as in "me", "myself") in English, with the meaning of immersing themselves into the project, taking it as a unique thing for each one of the members.

On November 15, 2023, Number_i made their debut appearance on the cover of the magazine Nylon Japan Global Issue 04.

=== 2024: Debut single and first appearances ===
On January 1, 2024, the first digital single "GOAT" was released.

On March 2, 2024, Number_i made its first TV appearance since its formation, appearing live on NHK's Venue101.

On March 6, 2024, Number_i's first CD single, "GOAT", was released exclusively through the Tobe Online Store, selling 481,475 copies in its first week and topping the Billboard Japan Weekly Single Sales Chart.

On April 12, the second digital single "Blow Your Cover" was released.

On April 14, 2024, Number_i made their debut appearance on the '88rising Futures' stage at the Coachella Valley Music and Arts Festival 2024, performing FUJI, and a remix version of "GOAT" with Jackson Wang.

On May 3, 2024, Number_i appeared on the cover of the May issue of the Korean magazine MAPS and the first issue of the Japanese version, MAPS Japan.

On May 27, 2024, their first album No. O: Ring was released.

Their single "Bon" reached number one on the June 5 Oricon Weekly Digital Single ranking chart, with 60,120 downloads in its first week, while the No. O: Ring album reached the top spot on the June 5 Oricon Weekly Digital Album ranking chart, with 31,804 downloads in the first week.

=== 2025 ===
The group was recipient of a negative X post on January 1, 2025, later erased, by cosmetics company Reju, where its community manager called them traitors and that their appearance in NHK's Kouhaku "rots my eyes and ears". After the backlash received from the group's fans, Reju posted an apology and decided, on January 5, to close operations definitively.

=== 2026: WME, first domes and overseas concerts ===
On February 4, 2026, it was announced that the group had signed with WME Group for international activities. Tobe will continue to manage the group in general activities. Later, in May, the group signed a record deal with Atlantic Records.

It was announced on August 3, 2026, that the group would have their first 5–dome concerts, as well as their first overseas tour. "Number_i LIVE TOUR No.III" tour will be divided into two chapters: "Chapter 1: Japan," visiting the domes in Hokkaido, Tokyo, Aichi, Osaka, and Fukuoka in October 2026, and "Chapter 2: Asia & North America," scheduled for 2027, full dates and venues still pending.

== Members ==
- Sho Hirano (平野 紫耀)
- Yuta Jinguji (神宮寺 勇太)
- Yuta Kishi (岸 優太)

== Discography ==
=== Studio albums ===
List of studio albums, with selected details, chart positions and sales
Title	Details	Peak chart positions			Sales
Title	Details	JPN	JPN Comb.	JPN Hot	Sales
No. I	Released: September 23, 2024; Label: Tobe; Formats: CD, CD+Blu-ray, digital download, streaming; Track listing: 1. "Inzm"; 2. "Like Heaven" (なんかHEAVEN); 3. "Ice"; 4. "Bye 24/7"; 5. "Jelly"; 6. "Tōmei ni Naritai" (透明になりたい); 7. "Numbers"; 8. "Recipe"; 9. "ILY"; 10. "GOAT"; 11. "Blow Your Cover"; 12. "Bon"; 13. "Inzm" (Hyper Band version)	—	3	1	JPN: 412,442 (phy.); JPN: 37,077 (dig.)
No. II	Released: September 22, 2025; Label: Tobe; Formats: CD, CD+Blu-ray, digital download, streaming; Track listing: 1. "In-flight"; 2. "U.M.A." (未確認領域); 3. "Atami"; 4. "Numbers Ur Zone"; 5. "Maku no Uchi" (幕ノ内); 6. "Pink Strawberry Chocolate Friday" (ピンクストロベリーチョコレートフライデー); 7. "Loop"; 8. "God_i"; 9. "KC Vibes"; 10. "Taboo"; 11. "Hard Life"; 12. "Kick Snare Man 2"; 13. "2ombie" 14. "Puff Puff Happy" (幸せいっぱい腹一杯); 15. "U.M.A." (Monjoe remix); 16. "i_Mode"	2	2	1	JPN: 298,426 (phy.); JPN: 22,259 (dig.)
"—" denotes releases that did not chart or were not released in that region.

=== Compilation albums ===
List of compilation albums, with selected details and chart positions
Title	Details	Peak chart positions	
Title	Details	JPN Comb.	JPN Hot
Daily&Love	Released: January 2, 2026; Label: Tobe; Formats: Digital download, streaming	6	7
Daily&Sun	Released: January 2, 2026; Label: Tobe; Formats: Digital download, streaming	10	11
Daily&Chill	Released: January 2, 2026; Label: Tobe; Formats: Digital download, streaming	11	14

=== Extended plays ===
List of extended plays, with selected details, chart positions and sales
Title	Details	Peaks		Sales
Title	Details	JPN Comb.	JPN Hot	Sales
GOAT	Released: March 6, 2024; Label: Tobe; Formats: CD, CD+Bluray, digital download, streaming; Track listing: 1. "GOAT"; 2. "Blow Your Cover"; 3. "Is It Me?"; 4. "Midnight City"; 5. "Fuji"; 6. "Rain or Shine"	3	—	JPN: 481,475 (phy.); JPN: 32,143 (dig.)
No. O: Ring	Released: May 27, 2024; Label: Tobe; Formats: CD, digital download, streaming; Track listing: 1. "Bon"; 2. "OK Complex"; 3. "Square_One"; 4. "No-Yes"; 5. "I"; 6. "Hanabira ga Mau Hi ni" 7. "Banana (Take It Lazy)"; 8. "Yume no Tsuzuki"	1	1	JPN: 324,114 (phy.); JPN: 39,364 (dig.)
God_i	Released: May 19, 2025; Label: Tobe; Formats: CD, CD+Blu-ray, digital download, streaming; Track listing: 1. "Goi_i"; 2. "Romeo & Juliet"; 3. "i_Dog"; 4. "No-Yes"; 5. "Frisco"; 6. "Psycho"; 7. "Hirakegoma"	3	—	JPN: 400,505 (phy.); JPN: 26,943 (dig.)
3XL	Released: April 24, 2026; Label: Tobe; Formats: CD, CD+Blu-ray, LP, digital download, streaming; Track listing: 1. "3XL"; 2. "Lavalava"; 3. "Super Bro"; 4. "Psyche Shock"; 5. "Influ"	3	—	JPN: 383,373 (phy.); JPN: 31,163 (dig.)
Rebon / Bugs Life / Digital Girl	Released: September 23, 2026; Label: Tobe; Formats: Digital download, streaming; Track listing: 1. "Rebon"; 2. "Bugs Life"; 3. "Digital Girl"; 4. "Numbers Pt. 2"; 5. "Deja Vu Club"; 6. "Patrasche"	3	—	JPN: 304,863 (phy.); JPN: 32,268 (dig.)
"—" denotes releases that did not chart or were not released in that region.

=== Singles ===
List of singles, with selected chart positions, showing year released, and album name
Title	Year	Peak chart positions				Certification	Album
Title	Year	JPN	JPN Comb.	JPN Hot	WW	Certification	Album
"GOAT"	2024	—	2	1	154	RIAJ: Platinum (st.)	No. I
"Blow Your Cover"	2024	—	6	5	—		No. I
"Bon"	2024	—	6	2	— (Note: "Bon" did not enter the Billboard Global 200, but peaked at number 170 on the Global Excl. US.)	RIAJ: Platinum (st.)	No. I
"Inzm"	2024	—	3	1	—	RIAJ: Platinum (st.)	No. I
"God_i"	2025	—	3	1	— (Note: "God_i" did not enter the Billboard Global 200, but peaked at number 168 on the Global Excl. US.)	RIAJ: Platinum (st.)	No. II
"U.M.A." (未確認領域)	2025	—	4	1	—		No. II
"3XL"	2026	—	3	1	— (Note: "God_i" did not enter the Billboard Global 200, but peaked at number 129 on the Global Excl. US.)		3XL
"Bugs Life"	2026	1	1	1	—	RIAJ: Platinum (phy.)	TBA
"Rebon"	2026	1	1	1	—	RIAJ: Platinum (phy.)	TBA
"Digital Girl"	2026	1	1	2	—	RIAJ: Platinum (phy.)	TBA
"—" denotes releases that did not chart or were not released in that region.

=== As featured artist ===
List of singles as featured artist, with selected chart positions, showing year released, and album name
Title	Year	Peak chart positions		Album
Title	Year	JPN Comb.	JPN Hot	Album
"GBAD" (Number_i remix) (with Jackson Wang)	2025	17	13	Non-album single

=== Promotional singles ===
List of promotional singles, with selected chart positions, showing year released, and album name
Title	Year	Peak chart positions		Album
Title	Year	JPN Comb.	JPN Hot	Album
"Numbers Ur Zone"	2025	9	4	No. II

=== Other charted songs ===
List of other charted songs, with selected chart positions, showing year released, and album name
Title	Year	Peak chart positions		Album
Title	Year	JPN Comb.	JPN Hot	Album
"Is It Me?"	2024	—	79	GOAT
"Midnight City"	2024	—	84	GOAT
"Fuji"	2024	—	66	GOAT
"Rain or Shine"	2024	—	99	GOAT
"OK Complex"	2024	—	81	No. O: Ring
"Square_One"	2024	—	71	No. O: Ring
"No-Yes"	2024	—	65	No. O: Ring
"I"	2024	—	80	No. O: Ring
"Banana (Take It Lazy)"	2024	—	100	No. O: Ring
"Ice"	2024	—	87	No. I
"Bye 24/7"	2024	—	92	No. I
"Tōmei ni Naritai" (透明になりたい)	2024	32	35	No. I
"Recipe"	2024	—	84	No. I
"ILY"	2024	—	86	No. I
"Hirakegoma"	2024	9	3	No. I (Deluxe)
"Romeo & Juliet"	2025	—	74	God_i
"i_Dog"	2025	—	59	God_i
"Frisco"	2025	—	78	God_i
"Psycho"	2025	—	65	God_i
"Atami"	2025	—	82	No. II
"Pink Strawberry Chocolate Friday" (ピンクストロベリーチョコレートフライデー)	2025	—	73	No. II
"Lavalava"	2025	9	2	No. II (Deluxe)
"Supa Bro"	2026	—	50	3XL
"Psyche Shock" (サイケSHOCK)	2026	—	57	3XL
"Influ" (インフル)	2026	—	43	3XL
"—" denotes releases that did not chart or were not released in that region.

== Music videos ==
Title	Year	Type	Director(s)	Ref.
"GOAT"	2024	Official	Yuichi Kodama	
"Blow your cover"	2024	Official	Yusuke Tanaka	
"Bon"	2024	Official	Takuto Shimpo, Mino (Nanon Creative) (CG)	
"INZM"	2024	Official	Takuto Shimpo	

== Advertisement ==
- McDonald's Japan (April 2024-)
- Kosé
  - Sekkisei (2024- )
- Vogue Japan
  - "Number_i x YSL Libre" Vogue Japan Official Website Special movie
- YSL Beauty
  - YSL Beauty Fragrance「LIBRE」（November 2023) (YSL Pop-up Store)

== Appearances ==
=== TV shows ===
- Tobe Live at Ariake Arena 2024: Number_i ~ No.O ~ring~ (August 15 2024, Episode 3)

=== Concerts ===
- Coachella Valley Music and Arts Festival 2024 (as part of 88rising Futures)
- Rock in Japan Festival 2024
- Summer Sonic 2024
- Wired Music Festival 2024
- 88Rising’s Head in the Clouds Festival at the Rose Bowl in Pasadena (2025)

== Awards ==
Year	Nominee / work	Award	Result
2024	GQ Men of the Year	Best Music Group Award	Won
