= Tobe (company) =

Japanese talent agency

Tobe Co., Ltd.
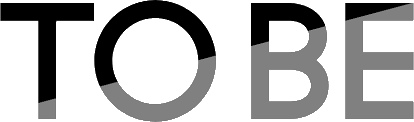
- Native name: 株式会社TOBE
- Romanized name: Kabushiki Gaisha Tobe
- Type: Private (kabushiki gaisha)
- Industry: Entertainment
- Founded: March 16, 2023; 3 years ago
- Founder: Hideaki Takizawa
- Headquarters: 2–5 Shincho, Hachiōji, Tokyo, Japan
- Products: Entertainment
- Services: Entertainment
- Website: tobe-official.jp

Tobe Co., Ltd. (株式会社TOBE, Kabushiki Gaisha TOBE; pronounced [tə bi]) is a Japanese talent agency based in Hachioji, Tokyo. It was established in March 16, 2023 by Hideaki Takizawa, who also serves as the agency's representative.

== History ==
Former Johnny and Associates talent and company vice president Takizawa announced on 21 March 2023 on his Twitter the establishment of a new company. He also said he was to seek new talent for the company.

On 2 July 2023, the first of the talents of the new company was presented to the public. It was revealed on YouTube that former Johnny's and V6 member Ken Miyake was going to be part of the talent. Almost a week later, on 7 July, a new video was released on YouTube, revealing the newest members, former Johnny's and King & Prince members Sho Hirano and Yuta Jinguji.

On 14 July, a new video was released on the official YouTube. It was to announce the new members of TOBE, the 7-member group "IMP.". IMP. is the former Johnny's Jr. group called IMPACTors. IMP. consists of members Arata Sato, Takuya Kageyama, Yuki Yokohara, Minato Matsui, Taiga Tsubaki, Shunsuke Motoi, and Taiga Suzuki. On the video, TOBE's Tiktok was also announced.

The next artist to be introduced was Ritsuki Ohigashi, another former Johnny's Jr. The announcement was made on TOBE's official Twitter on 16 August 2023.

On 13 September 2023, a new "#TOBECONTINUED" teaser video was released on YouTube. The new artist was to be revealed on the 17, but voices in X (formerly Twitter) were already guessing the identity of the new member, being this person former Johnny's Kis-My-Ft2 member Hiromitsu Kitayama, who had recently left the agency. On 17 September 2023, Kitayama's identity was revealed, introducing him as the latest member of TOBE.

On October 15, another former King & Prince member, Yuta Kishi, announced that he joined the agency and reunited with Hirano and Jinguji to form a new group called Number i.

It was announced on 16 December 2023 that the Tobe artists would have their first concert in Tokyo Dome in March 2024. The announcement was made through the official membership site. The name of the concert series, to HEROes ~ TOBE 1st Super Live~, as well as the details of the same, were announced on 23 December 2023.

On November 11, 2024, Tobe announced the formation of a new group, together with the release of their official site and fan club. The new group, Class Seven, is formed by 7 members ranging from 14 years the youngest, to 19 the oldest. More about the debut and further information will be released at a later date. That same day was announced an official fan club for the trainees.

Former Starto Entertainment trainee group Bi Shonen member Issei Kanasashi was announced as the newest member on December 3, 2024, through a live stream video on Tobe's YouTube. Kanasashi will use his first name as his new artist name. He announced new SNS and fan club starting that same day.

On March 9, 2025, it was announced that the group would star in Takizawa's stage production "Impact". This work, which will be performed at the Misonoza Theater in Nagoya from May 1st, followed by Kanazawa and Hiroshima, is IMP.'s first leading role on stage. It is divided into two parts, a show and a play, and the play part will feature "Taira no Masakado," which Takizawa previously performed on stage. The ending song will be written by Kitayama Hiromitsu. Also appearing will be Daito Tatsuki, Takada San, Kondo Hiromi, Yokota Taiga, and Nakazawa Ren from Class Seven. It was also announced that Class Seven would be having their distribution debut on July 7.

On December 20, 2025, it was announced that Tobe joined with Pony Canyon to establish new label "RED ON". The label, whose name, "RED", takes the meaning "Resonance", "Expression", and "Destiny", aims to open up new possibilities for artistic expression in the domestic and international music scene. Tobe artist Hiromitsu Kitayama, who transferred there from TOBE Music, is its first artist.

On March 5, 2026, it was announced that trainee group Wink First was chosen as navigators for the event commemorating the 10th anniversary of the Kumamoto earthquake.

== Charity events ==
Takizawa and his team of artists, led by Ken Miyake, volunteered at a soup kitchen set in Wajima Junior High School on January 4, 2024, following the January 1 Noto Peninsula earthquake. People in the area were surprised to see the likes of Miyake, Number_i's Yuta Jinguji and members of IMP. serving meals, including hamburgers and curry, to around 1000 victims in the disaster area. The action was met with mixed feelings on social media. While one woman in her 70s tearfully thanked the action saying that it was the first hot meal she had in days, and other comments were of gratitude and surprise for not having made any announcement on social media, many thought their presence that early after the earthquake would hinder the rescue effort

As part of their charity activities, Tobe artists released, as the special unit "to HEROes", the song "Be on your side", composed by Misako Sakazume, Slack Rat and Uno Blaqlo, with lyrics by the members of Number_i on March 18, 2024 on streaming and download sites, with a CD version being released on May 1st. Proceeds from the sale of the song, both from the download sites as well as the CD, will be destined for the children in the affected area.

== Controversies ==
Since its conception, the agency has faced negative and inappropriate comments, many related to its founder and his former status with the agency to which he had belonged (Johnny & Associates). The latest of such comments affected Tobe's group Number_i, who were recipients of a negative X post on January 1, 2025, later erased, by cosmetics company Reju, calling them traitors and that their appearance in NHK's Kouhaku "rots my eyes and ears". After the backlash received from the group's fans, Reju posted an apology and decided, on January 5, to close operations definitively.

== Current artists ==
=== Recording artists ===
==== Groups ====
- Number i
  - Sho Hirano
  - Yuta Jinguji
  - Yuta Kishi
- IMP.
  - Arata Sato
  - Shunsuke Motoi
  - Taiga Suzuki
  - Takuya Kageyama
  - Minato Matsui
  - Yuki Yokohara
  - Taiga Tsubaki
- Class Seven (with members of the former trainee group DeePals)
  - Taiga Yokota
  - Taikai Kondo
  - Ren Takada
  - Ritsuki Ôhigashi
  - Shuu Takano
  - Ren Nakazawa
  - Keito Hoshi

==== Soloists ====
- Ken Miyake
- Hiromitsu Kitayama
- Issei

=== Trainees ===
There are currently 28 junior talent trainees, of which, on March 14, a group of 5 members, with ages ranging from 11 to 13, was chosen.

- Wink First
  - Taiga Shimada (center)
  - Shoma Fujishiro
  - Kou Matsuzaki
  - Ruki Kawada
  - Yushi Kosukegawa

== Multi-artist programs ==
Year	Title	Performing artist	Notes	Ref.
2024	Tobe Live at Ariake Arena	Ken Miyake, Hiromitsu Kitayama, Number_i, IMP.	4 episodes containing 2024 concerts: Ken Miyake's "2024 Live Performance The Otherside: Another Me Presented by Ken Miyake" (June 22); Hiromitsu Kitayama's "Ranshin" (June 15); Number_i's "No.O~ring~" (June 19); Imp.'s "Departure" (June 14)	
2024	TOBEの夏休み. ~ハワイ独占密着！新たな決意~	Ken Miyake, Hiromitsu Kitayama, Number_i, and IMP.	Summary of 120 hours in Hawaii, in 4 episodes	

== Multi-artist concerts and events ==
Year	Title	Schedule	Performing artist	Notes	Ref.
2024	to HEROes ~TOBE 1st Super Live~	March 14-17, 2024, Tokyo Dome	Ken Miyake, Hiromitsu Kitayama, Number_i, IMP., Ritsuki Ohigashi	Last concert was streamed worldwide on Prime in March 2024	
2024	Act for HOPE to HEROes PROJECT in TOKYO DOME	August 11, 2024, Tokyo Dome	Ken Miyake, Hiromitsu Kitayama, Number_i, IMP., wink first (trainee), DeePals (trainee), (trainee)	Charity event	
2025	to HEROes ~TOBE 2nd Super Live~	March 6-7, 2025, Tokyo Dome; April 6-7, 2025, Kyocera Dome (Osaka)	Ken Miyake, Hiromitsu Kitayama, Number_i, IMP., Class Seven, Wink First (Trainees), Trainees		
2026	to HEROes ~TOBE 3rd Super Live~	April 20-22, 2026, Vantelin Dome Nagoya (Aichi); May 16, 17, Daiwa House Premist Dome (Sapporo Dome, Hokkaido)	Ken Miyake, Hiromitsu Kitayama, Number_i, IMP., Class Seven, Wink First (Trainees), Trainees		
