= Minato Matsui =

Japanese singer

- 松井 奏
- Born: 2 September 2000 (age 25); Chiba, Japan
- Occupations: Singer; actor
- Years active: 2011–present
- Agent: Tobe
- Musical career
- Genres: J-pop
- Label: Tobe Music
- Member of: IMP.
- Website: https://tobe-official.jp/artists/imp

Minato Matsui (松井奏, Minato Matsui; born September 2, 2000) is a Japanese actor and singer. He is affiliated with Tobe. He is a member of the male idol group IMP. He is from Chiba.

== History ==
Matsui joined Johnny & Associates in June 2012 and began his activities as Johnny's Jr. In 2016, he was also a member of Johnny's Jr. unit Classmate J.

He was selected as a member of the seven-member Johnny's Jr. unit IMPACTors, whose formation was announced on "Music Station 2 Hours Special" broadcast on October 16, 2020.

In October 2022, played the lead role in the musical Encore!.

On May 25, 2023, he left Johnny & Associates. On July 14, he announced that all members of the former IMPACTors would join TOBE and become members of the idol group IMP..

== Filmography ==
=== TV program ===
- Test no Hanamichi New Benzemi (April 3, 2017 - March 26, 2018, NHK Educational TV)
- Satafuku (July 24, 2021 - March 25, 2023, Fukushima TV) - "IMPACTors Kanade Matsui's shock! FUKUSHIMA" corner

=== TV drama ===
- Saki ni Umareta Dake no Boku (October 14, 2017 - December 16, 2017, Nippon Television) - Aida Osamu [Class 2-3]

=== Stage ===
- JOHNNYS' ALL STARS IsLAND (December 3, 2016 - January 24, 2017, Imperial Theater)
- Takizawa Kabuki ZERO (April 10 - May 19, 2019, Shinbashi Enbujo)
- ABC-za Johnny's Legend 2019 (October 7–29, 2019, Nissay Theater)
- Endless SHOCK 20th Anniversary (February 4, 2020 - February 26, 2020, Imperial Theater)
- Endless SHOCK -Eternal- (September 15 - October 12, 2020, Umeda Arts Theater Main Hall)
- Endless SHOCK -Eternal- (February 4, 2021 - March 31, Imperial Theater)
- Encore! (October 14–28, 2022, Sogetsu Hall / November 1–3, COOL JAPAN PARK OSAKA TT Hall) - Starring Kamito

=== Movie ===
- Takizawa Kabuki Zero 2020 The Movie (2020)
- Endless Shock (2021)
- Suicide Notes Laid on the Table (2025), Rihito Akazaki
