= Orthros no Inu =

- オルトロスの犬
- Genre: Suspense
- Starring: See below
- Opening theme: "Hikari Hitotsu" by Hideaki Takizawa
- Country of origin: Japan
- Original language: Japanese
- No. of series: 1
- No. of episodes: 9

Production
- Producer: Mishiro Shinichi
- Production location: Tokyo
- Running time: 54 minutes

Original release
- Network: TBS
- Release: July 24 – September 25, 2009

Orthros no Inu (オルトロスの犬, Orutorosu no Inu; Orthros Dog) is a TBS Japanese television drama, which stars Hideaki Takizawa and Ryo Nishikido. The series aired on July 24, 2009.

== Plot synopsis ==
Ryuzaki Shinji who possesses a "God Hand", the power to heal wounds and illnesses just by touching the patient, is in fact a dark introvert who does not reveal his true self to others. Aoi Ryosuke who possesses the "Demon's Hand", the power to kill a person just by touching him, is as kind and pure as an angel. It is said when the demon meets the God, a fatal battle begins. Detective Hasebe Nagisa gets caught by the criminals during a deep cover operation. Ryosuke, a man she does not even know comes to save her and she witnesses his "Demon's Hand" in action. Thereafter she discovers by coincidence the existence of Shinji's "God Hand" and brings the two together. Little did she know that this would cause great disorder to the world and even to her own life.

== Cast ==
- Hideaki Takizawa as Shinji Ryūzaki
- Ryo Nishikido as Ryōsuke Aoi
- Asami Mizukawa as Nagisa Hasebe
- Hikaru Yaotome as Masaru Kumakiri
- Ryuji Yamamoto as Sōsuke Shibata
- Natsuki Harada as Chiharu Maezono
- Shugo Oshinari as Masato Yoshizumi
- Haru as Kana Shirakawa
- Toshio Shiba as Zenzō Kumakiri
- Seiji Rokkaku as Ken Ninomiya
- Kuranosuke Sasaki as Takayuki Sawamura
- Atsuko Takahata as Yōko Sakaki
