= Kaito Takahashi =

Japanese actor and singer (born 1999)

- 髙橋 海人
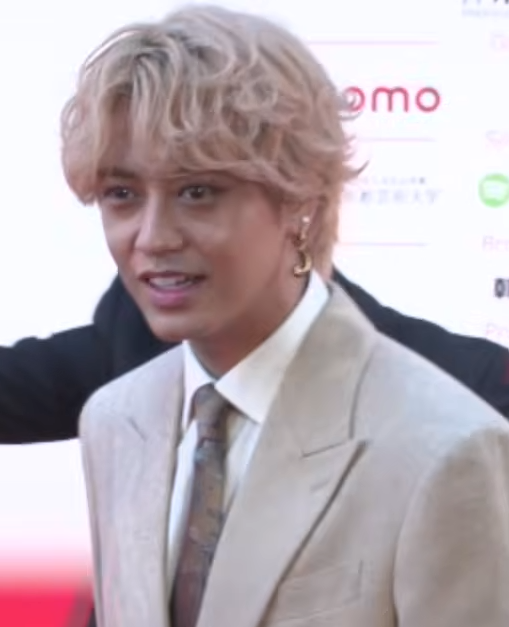
- Takahashi at the 2026 Music Awards Japan
- Born: April 3, 1999 (age 27); Kanagawa, Japan
- Other names: Kai-chan, Takaito
- Occupations: Actor; Singer; Manga artist; Idol
- Years active: 2013–present
- Agents: Starto Entertainment (Since 2024); Johnny & Associates (From 2013 to 2023)
- Musical career
- Genre: J-pop
- Instrument: Vocals
- Label: Universal Music Japan
- Member of: King & Prince
- Website: Kaito Takahashi on Instagram; King & Prince (Starto Entertainment); King & Prince (Universal Music Japan)

Kaito Takahashi (Japanese: 髙橋 海人, Hepburn: Takahashi Kaito), born April 3, 1999 is a Japanese singer, actor, and manga artist. He is a member of boy band King & Prince and Mr. King.

Born in Kanagawa Prefecture. His agency is King & Prince K.K., and he has a group agent contract with Starto Entertainment.

== Biography ==
=== Early life ===
Takahashi started dancing in preschool. He says he started to learn dancing because his elder sister was learning Yosakoi, and his parents encouraged him to begin dance. Takahashi's father was very rigorous in his instruction at home and he sometimes ran away from home because of this strictness. Takahashi formed a dance group in 2008 to participate in contests. He has won several competitions with his dance group and has also toured with SMAP as a backup dancer. He then left the dance group and studied dance for about two years with dancer Noppo (Shit Kingz) from the first year of junior high school.

=== Starting out ===
In 2013, Takahashi's parents sent the Johnny's organisation a resume, and told him to audition for the organisation, but Takahashi, who wished to work as a dancer in the future, argued against that. However his mother convinced him pointing out that they had paid for his dancing so far, and he reluctantly agreed. After an audition, Takahashi joined Johnny's in July 2013. In June 2015, a limited time group, Mr King vs Prince was formed as an official support group for TV Asahi's summer event TV Asahi Roppongi Hills Summer Festival Summer Station. Takahashi was chosen as a member of Mr. King. After the event, it was announced that the group would continue, and he would continue as a member of Mr. King from 2016 onward.

=== King and Prince ===
On May 23, 2018, he made his CD debut as a member of King & Prince with the single Cinderella Girl.

From the May issue of the same year, Takahashi began a series in Shogakukan's Betsucomi comic magazine, called Idol, Sometimes Shōjo manga artist, in which he learnt how to draw manga and become an aspiring manga artist by interviewing different manga artists. As the culmination of this series, Takahashi published an original 14-page girls' manga which appeared in the May 2019 issue of the same magazine. the title of the manga was My super love story! Prince and boys are a very fine line!. He was the first Johnny's talent to debut as a shōjo manga artist.

On January 1, 2022, in the Nippon Television variety show King & Prince Ru., Takahashi attempted to break the record for "longest time running on a non-Newtonian fluid", and set a new record of 1 minute 6.49 seconds, becoming the Guinness World Records holder.

On August 24, 2023, Takahashi won the 116th The Television Drama Academy Award for Best Actor for his role in the TV series Passion for Punchlines.

Currently, he is using his talent for dancing to choreograph songs for King & Prince and Travis Japan.

== Awards ==
Years	Awards	work	department	Ref.
2023	116th The Television Drama Academy Award	Passion for Punchlines	Best Actor	

== Filmography ==
=== TV series ===
Year	Title	Role	Notes	Ref.
2018	Club activities, I have to like it, right?	Nishino		
2019	Black School Rules	Nakaya Tsukioka		
2020	Our Sister's Soulmate	Kazuki Adachi		
2021	Dragon Zakura 2nd series	Teruki Seto		
2022	10 Counts to the Future	Kaito Iba		
2022	Boyfriend Calling!	Asahi	Leading role	
2023	Passion for Punchlines	Masayasu Wakabayashi	Leading role	
2024	95	Akihisa Hiroshige	Leading role	
2025	Our Happy Family	Kazuo Hirayama	Television film	
2025	Dope: Narcotics Control Department Special Investigation Unit	Yuto Saiki	Leading role	

=== Movie ===
Year	Title	Role	Notes	Ref.
2019	Black School Rules	Nakaya Tsukioka		
2022	Akira and Akira	Ryoma Kaido		
2022	Dr. Coto's Clinic 2022	Hantou Oda		
2025	Can't Cry with Your Face	Manami Mizumura (Riku Sakahira)		
2025	Hokusai's Daughter	Keisai Eisen		
2027	Prism	Ritsu Okita	Leading role	

== Stage ==
- Dream Boys Jet (September 5–29, 2013, Imperial Theatre)
- Johnnys' 2020 World -Johnny's Tonitoni World- (December 7, 2013 – January 27, 2014, Imperial Theatre)
- Johnnys Ginza 2014 (May 24, 25, 31, June 1, 2014, Theatre Creation)
- Dream Boys (September 4–30, 2014, Imperial Theatre)
- 2015 New Year Johnnys' World (January 1–27, 2015, Imperial Theatre)
- Johnny's Ginza 2015 (April 24–26 and May 30 – June 1, 2015, Theatre Creation)
- Dream Boys (September 3–30, 2016, Imperial Theatre) – as Johnnys'5
- Johnnys' IsLand (December 8, 2019 – January 27, 2020, Imperial Theatre)

== Other activities ==
=== Commercials ===
- Mikakuto "Tokuno Milk 8.2 Candy" (October 16, 2021)
- Honda "Honda Heart" (August 6, 2022)
- Universal Music Japan "Our summer songs campaign" (July 4, 2024)

=== Supporter ===
- The Dance Day (2024) – Convention Supporter (Dance competition broadcast on Nippon Television affiliate from 2022)

=== Music video ===
- Sexy Zone "Bye Bye Dubai (See You Again)" / "A My Girl Friend" (2013)

=== Event ===
- Shit Kingz Fes 2024 Momotaro (July 27 & 28, 2024, Yokohama Buntai) – secret guest

== Choreography ==
=== King and Prince ===
- "Bubbles & Troubles"
- "Body Paint"
- "Nanana" (co-choreography with Sho Hirano) song of Travis Japan

=== Travis Japan ===
- +81 Dance Studio "SHAKE" song of SMAP
