= Suicide Notes Laid on the Table =

Japanese manga series

- First tankōbon volume cover

遺書、公開。 (Isho, Kōkai.)
- Genre: Mystery; Suspense
- Manga
- Written by: Toutarou Minami
- Published by: Square Enix
- English publisher: NA: Square Enix
- Imprint: Gangan Comics Joker
- Magazine: Monthly Gangan Joker
- Original run: September 22, 2017 – January 21, 2022
- Volumes: 9
- Live-action film
- Directed by: Tsutomu Hanabusa
- Written by: Osamu Suzuki
- Studio: Shochiku
- Released: January 31, 2025

Suicide Notes Laid on the Table (遺書、公開。, Isho, Kōkai.) is a Japanese manga series written and illustrated by Toutarou Minami. It was serialized in Square Enix's Monthly Gangan Joker magazine from September 2017 to January 2022. A live-action film adaptation premiered in Japanese theaters in January 2025.

== Plot ==
Every student in class 2-D at Kairei Private Middle School after receives an anonymous message ranking the class from top to bottom. Although no one knows who created the list or what it truly means, the students begin treating it as a social hierarchy. The highest ranked student, Tsubaki Himeyama, appears to defuse the tension through her kind and impartial behavior, but the class is thrown into turmoil when she dies by suicide in the girls bathroom.

Three days later, after returning from Himeyama's funeral, the students find 29 separate suicide notes placed on every desk, including the teacher's. Each note is addressed to a different person and contains information connected to Himeyama's death, the class ranking, and secrets hidden among the students. In order to understand why Himeyama died, the class begins reading the letters aloud in weekly sessions, gradually exposing the rivalries, guilt, and social pressures concealed beneath the surface.

== Characters ==
Shuya Ikenaga (池永柊夜, Ikenaga Shūya)
Portrayed by: Hokuto Yoshino
Seiichi Chikage (千蔭清一, Chikage Seiichi)
Portrayed by: Ryubi Miyase
Kurumi Hatsukaichi (廿日市くるみ, Hatsukaichi Kurumi)
Portrayed by: Sara Shida
Masato Akazuki (赤崎理人, Akazuki Masato)
Portrayed by: Minato Matsui
Rina Mikado (御門凛奈, Mikado Rina)
Portrayed by: Akari Takaishi
Tsubaki Himeyama (姫山椿, Himeyama Tsubaki)
Portrayed by: Miona Hori
Makoto Kaihara (甲斐原誠, Kaihara Makoto)
Portrayed by: Shugo Oshinari

== Media ==
=== Manga ===
Written and illustrated by Toutarou Minami, Suicide Notes Laid on the Table was serialized in Square Enix's Monthly Gangan Joker magazine from September 22, 2017, to January 21, 2022. Its chapters were compiled into nine tankōbon volumes released from March 22, 2018, to February 22, 2022.

The series is published in English on Square Enix's Manga Up! Global app.

No.	Release date	ISBN
1	March 22, 2018	978-4-7575-5669-0
2	June 22, 2018	978-4-7575-5759-8
3	December 21, 2018	978-4-7575-5956-1
4	May 22, 2019	978-4-7575-6149-6
5	January 22, 2020	978-4-7575-6474-9
6	June 22, 2020	978-4-7575-6707-8
7	January 22, 2021	978-4-7575-7042-9
8	August 20, 2021	978-4-7575-7429-8
9	February 22, 2022	978-4-7575-7749-7

=== Live-action film ===
A live-action film adaptation was announced on October 21, 2024. The film is directed by Tsutomu Hanabusa, with scripts written by Osamu Suzuki. It premiered in Japanese theaters on January 31, 2025.

== Reception ==
As part of their 2024 recommendations, MyAnimeList users recommended the series for its Unique Story/Art.
