= The Sun Never Sets (TV series) =

- Screenplay by: Fumie Mizuhashi
- Directed by: Isamu Nakae; Naruhide Mizuta; Shinichi Sakuraba
- Starring: Hideaki Takizawa; Yasuko Matsuyuki; Yūka
- Country of origin: Japan
- Original language: Japanese
- No. of episodes: 11

Original release
- Network: Fuji TV
- Release: April 13 – June 22, 2000

The Sun Never Sets (Japanese: 太陽は沈まない, Hepburn: Taiyou wa Shizumanai) is a 2000 Japanese television series. Starring Hideaki Takizawa, Yasuko Matsuyuki and Yūka, it aired from 13 April to 22 June 2000 on Fuji TV.

== Plot ==
Nao Masaki (Hideaki Takizawa) is a 17-year-old high school student whose family runs an Okonomiyaki shop. Suspecting medical malpractice, he decides to find out the truth of her death. With the help of a neighbourhood lawyer Setsu Kirino (Yasuko Matsuyuki), will he succeed in finding the truth of her death when the hospital is determined to hide it until the end?

== Cast ==
- Hideaki Takizawa as Nao Masaki
- Yasuko Matsuyuki as Setsu Kirino
- Yūka as Ami Isetani
- Keiko Takeshita as Teruko Masaki
- Ran Ito as Akiko Isetani
- Isao Bito as Shiro Masaki
- Ren Osugi as Keizo Isetani
- Hitomi Satō as Yuko Masaki
- Masaki Kyomoto as Etsushi Minami
