= Boku dake no Madonna =

- 僕だけのマドンナ (Boku dake no Madonna)
- Starring: Hideaki Takizawa; Kyōko Hasegawa
- Opening theme: "Namida no Umi de Dakaretai ~Sea of Love~" by Southern All Stars
- Country of origin: Japan
- No. of episodes: 11

Original release
- Network: Fuji TV
- Release: July 7 – September 15, 2003

Boku dake no Madonna (僕だけのマドンナ, Boku dake no Madonna), sometimes shortened to BokuMado (僕マド, Boku Mado), is a drama series that aired in Japan on Fuji TV in 2003. In English it is often called You are my only Madonna / ... and I Love Her.

== Cast ==
- Hideaki Takizawa as Suzuki Kyouichi
- Kyōko Hasegawa as Kataoka Surumi
- Koutaro Koizumi as Nakano Takashi
- Hitomi Shimatani as Imamura Keiko
- Manami Konishi as Shimada Rie
- Naoto Ogata as Honda Yoshitaka
- Kotaro Shiga as Prof. Tatebayashi Shingo
- Leo Morimoto as Kuramoto Shoutaro
- Miki Maya as Matsuno Shizue
- Reiko Matsuo as Shimizu Moeko
- Kazuki Kosakai as Ichigaya Sho
- Kyusaku Shimada as Oosugi Kazuma

== Plot ==
Kyoichi living alone for the first time comes home one day to find a girl asleep in his bed. Through the next few days he meets her again and again eventually coming to find out he has feelings for her. But she is hiding things from him he has no idea about.

== Theme song ==
- SEA OF LOVE by Southern All Stars
