= Honey So Sweet =

Manga series

- Cover of the first manga volume

ハニー (Hanī)
- Genre: Romance
- Manga
- Written by: Amu Meguro
- Published by: Shueisha
- English publisher: Viz Media
- Magazine: Bessatsu Margaret
- Original run: August 2012 – December 2015
- Volumes: 8
- Live-action television film
- Directed by: Koji Shintoku
- Released: March 31, 2018
- Runtime: 105 min.

Honey So Sweet (Japanese: ハニー, Hepburn: Hanī; Honey in Japan) is a Japanese romance shōjo manga series written and illustrated by Amu Meguro. Published by Shueisha, it was serialized on Bessatsu Margaret magazine and has been compiled into eight volumes. It was originally released as a one-shot called Granulated Sugar. It is published in English by Viz Media. Honey was adapted into a live-action film starring Sho Hirano and Yuna Taira in March 2018.

== Plot ==
The story follows Nao Kogure, a high school girl, as she is asked out by a reputed delinquent Taiga Onise to be his girlfriend with intent of marriage. Nao discovers that Onise is actually a very kind and misunderstood person who she had helped out back in middle school by lending him her umbrella and some bandages. As Nao and Onise work on becoming friends, they befriend other students.

== Characters ==
Nao Kogure
The viewpoint character of the story, Nao is a shy girl with short brown hair and brown eyes.^{Ch. 1} She starts off as easily frightened and worried and a bit of a coward, but gains courage and self confidence throughout the series. She at first dated Taiga because she was scared he would beat her if she didn't, but as she gets to know him realizes how kind he truly is and falls in love with him. Her parents died when she was six so her uncle Sou looks after her.^{Ch. 1, 4} She initially had a crush on Sou, but later realizes that it was not a romantic love. Despite her shy personality, she does become more perceptive of how people feel and does everything to help others, especially her friends and family. She is cute, pretty, intelligent, and girly but a terrible cook.^{Ch. 5}
Taiga Onise
A boy with the face of a demon but the heart and purity of an angel who is in love with Kogure after she gave him her umbrella and bandages upon seeing him in the rain after a fight.^{Vol. 1} He dyes his hair red which makes him seem like a delinquent^{Ch. 1} but in reality did so because he admired the red ranger and wanted to look and be as heroic as him.^{Ch. 10} His mother divorced his father when he was in third grade and to help support her he learned how to cook and take care of the house. He also has an older brother who is married. He enjoys making adorable lunches (sometimes with hearts), doing grand romantic gestures like confessing to Kogure with a bouquet of flowers, and being embarrassed by the mere thought of kissing Kogure. He is faithful to her and despite his appearances would never start a fight without a good reason. He is also an animal lover.^{Vol. 1}
Sousuke Kogure
Nao's uncle and guardian.^{Ch. 1} After his sister and brother-in-law's death, he quit his job and dedicated himself to taking care of his niece Nao. He is quiet, mature, and wears glasses. He is also a good cook. He is very wise, often giving good advice and insight for Nao and is envious of Taiga as Nao is growing up and moving on without him, but at the same time supports their relationship and acts as a big brother to him. He runs a cafe called Felice. He is in his mid-twenties and used to be a smoker but quit after adopting Nao.^{Vol. 1}
Ayumu Misaki
A good-looking boy with a short temper and dirty mouth, often cussing like a sailor. He is recruited against his will by his classmate Taiga to join their first field trip group.^{Ch. 2} He is fairly sensitive; Kayo calls him a tsundere (cold at first, but nicer after getting to know him)^{Ch. 10}
Kayo Yashiro
A beautiful but quiet loner girl who initially joins Nao and Taiga's group for their field trip preparation,^{Ch. 2} later saying that she found it to be fun, and that she liked the food.^{Ch. 6} She is a bit sadistic in prompting people to do things, but helps Nao with her relationship.^{Ch. 6} She is a straight-A student.^{Ch. 7} She tends to hang out with Ayumu Misaki after they pair Nao and Taiga together.
Ayaha Futami
Taiga's classmate who befriends him after dismissing rumors about him. He is handsome, popular, and athletic.^{Ch. 10} He enjoys receiving attention and hanging out with others but tends to find it tiring that he has to act rightful and cheerful around people but Nao points out his kindness at being able to handle and socialize with others, causing him to fall in love with her. He describes himself as someone who steals what he wants but realizes Nao and Taiga have a strong relationship and concedes defeat and remains friends with Taiga, but promises to steal Nao if the two break up.^{Vol. 3}

== Publication history ==
No.	Original release date	Original ISBN	English release date	English ISBN
1	January 25, 2013	978-4-08-846882-2	January 5, 2016	978-1-4215-8325-9
1. Honey So Sweet; 2. First as Friends; 3. Field Trip Start; 4. Never Give Up!; 5. The Interview
First-year high school girl Nao Kogure is asked by reputed delinquent Taiga Onise to be his girlfriend with intent of marriage. Nao at first accepts out of fear, but after checking with his uncle and guardian Sou, she tries to get to know Onise first. She learns that despite his looks, Onise is a very kind person towards his teachers and neighbors, and very formal and respectful towards Nao. She explains to Onise that she actually loves someone else (her uncle Sou), but that they can be friends first, and Onise agrees. During preparations for the inter-class field trip, Nao and Onise form a group with some other loner schoolmates: the beautiful Kayo Yashiro and the reluctant Ayumu Misaki. Onise makes a packet for their group to have fun but Misaki tears it, prompting Nao to want to strike at Misaki until Onise holds her back. Misaki later apologizes. During the event, Onise catches a cold and can't participate in the "scare dare" (test of courage). However, when Nao is left alone (some noises scared Misaki and Yashiro away), Onise rescues her. When Sou sprains his wrist, Nao invites Onise to help cook for a regular customer's kid named Masaki, who at first is scared of Onise for the way he looks but Nao helps Masaki warm up to him.
2	June 25, 2013	978-4-08-845060-5	April 5, 2016	978-1-4215-8329-7
6. Suddenly; 7. Just the Two of Us; 8. I Need to Tell You Something; 9. The Path to Happiness; 10. Can We Be Friends?
When Nao confides with Yashiro on her romance situation, Yashiro suggests she imagine kissing each of them and to let things develop naturally. During a study session with Onise, Nao falls asleep, but Onise spontaneously kisses her, waking her up. Nao tells Sou she is in love with someone else now. After Nao, Onise, Yashiro and Misaki are kicked out of the library for being too noisy, Nao finds herself studying with Onise in his room. Nao makes cookies for Onise but when she runs late for their date, Onise gets beaten up by some other students. Nao tells Onise she wants to date him, and they then get Sou's acceptance. A popular boy Ayaha Futami befriends Onise, but it makes Nao nervous when he knows things about him that Nao does not.
3	November 25, 2013	978-4-08-845131-2	July 5, 2016	978-1-4215-8330-3
11. Ayaha Futami; 12. "Nao"; 13. Onise's Motives; 14. Just Kidding; 15. Sports Festival; Bonus manga: My First Errand
4	April 25, 2014	978-4-08-845196-1	October 4, 2016	978-1-4215-8331-0
16. Your Courage; 17. Thank You; 18. Misaki and Yashiro; 19. Their Romance; 20. Unyielding; Bonus manga: A Tale of a Small Love
5	September 25, 2014	978-4-08-845267-8	January 3, 2017	978-1-4215-8332-7
6	February 25, 2015	978-4-08-845349-1	April 4, 2017	978-1-4215-8333-4
7	July 24, 2015	978-4-08-845419-1	July 4, 2017	978-1-4215-9123-0
8	December 25, 2015	978-4-08-845502-0	October 3, 2017	978-1-4215-9124-7

== Reception ==
Volume 2 reached the 42nd place on the weekly Oricon manga charts and, as of June 29, 2013, has sold 30,308 copies; volume 3 reached the 18th place and, as of December 1, 2013, has sold 50,169 copies; volume 5 reached the 12th place and, as of October 5, 2014, has sold 108,341 copies; volume 6 reached the 14th place and, as of March 1, 2015, has sold 80,912 copies.

It was number seven in the Nationwide Bookstore Employees' Recommended Comics of 2014.

== Notes ==
- "Ch." is shortened form for chapter and refers to a chapter number of the collected Honey So Sweet manga
