= Yuta Kishi =

Japanese singer and actor (born 1995)

- 岸 優太
- Born: 29 September 1995 (age 30); Saitama, Japan
- Occupations: Singer; actor; tarento
- Years active: 2009–present
- Agent: Tobe
- Height: 167 cm (5 ft 6 in)
- Musical career
- Genres: J-pop
- Labels: Johnny's Universe; Tobe Music
- Member of: Number i
- Formerly of: King & Prince

Yuta Kishi (岸 優太, Kishi Yūta; born 29 September 1995) is a Japanese singer, actor and television personality, member of Number i under Tobe, formerly of King & Prince under Johnny & Associates. His film and television roles have included Toi in Oniichan, Gacha, Yūsuke Kaji in Defying Kurosaki-kun, Shu Maiko in Nisekoi, Arata Fukazawa in Night Doctor and Inokichi Myojin in Hissatsu Shigotonin.

== Early life ==
Kishi was born in Saitama Prefecture, Japan. He has an older brother and a younger sister, brought up in a single parent family, cared for by his father. Though his father knew about him being easily bored and tending to quit activities, he would ask for those that he seemed interested in, resulting in his having several hobbies, such as soccer, karate and piano, to taking ballet classes, after asking for them many times.

He played baseball in elementary school.

== Career ==
=== As member of Johnny and Associates ===
Kishi joined the Japanese talent agency Johnny & Associates on 20 July 2009, when he was in his second year of middle school. He performed in Koichi Domoto's musical Endless Shock for three consecutive years from 2013 to 2015.

In 2015, Kishi was selected as a member of subunit Mr. Prince (later Prince) of Johnny's Jr. special group Mr. King vs Mr. Prince, who would sing the theme song for TV Asahi's event "Roppongi Hills Summer Festival SUMMER STATION". He would continue working as part of Mr. King and Mr. Prince, as well as for Mr. Prince. In 2018, both subunits would unite as the group King & Prince. debuting in May 2018. Kishi would be selected as its leader.

Kishi made his TV drama debut in Kamen Teacher in 2013 as Shishimaru, one of the key students. The following year, he appeared in Kin Kyori Renai, an adaptation of the manga series of the same name. Kishi's first lead role was in Oniichan, Gacha, opposite Rio Suzuki. For his performance, he won the TVnavi Drama of the Year award for Best New Actor. Kishi starred as Masaya in the NHK TV drama Oedo Robocon in 2017. He played a high school student who traveled back in Edo era and joined a Karakuri puppet contest using his skills. In 2021, he starred in the drama Night Doctor, alongside Haru and Kei Tanaka. His performance won him the Nikkan Sports Drama Grand Prix Award for Best Supporting Actor.

He left the group on May 22, 2023, and Johnny & Associates on September 30, 2023.

=== As member of TOBE ===
Kishi was announced as the newest member of TOBE on 15 October 2023. He, together with Sho Hirano and Yuta Jinguji, form part of the group "Number i".

On January 30, 2025, Kishi was named brand ambassador for Banana Republic Japan. On the 31th, Kishi participated in the opening ceremony for the brand's Toranomon Hills store. He was also included in the brand's Spring 2025 collection campaign "Inspiring the modern explorer".

== Filmography ==
=== Television ===
==== Drama ====
Year	Title	Role	Network	Ref.
2013	Kamen Teacher	Shishimaru	NTV	
2014	Kin Kyori Renai	Kanata Ayukawa	NTV	
2015	Oniichan, Gacha	Toy	NTV	
2015	Defying Kurosaki-kun	Yusuke Kaji	NTV	
2017	Oedo Robokon	Masaya Amuro	NHK	
2021	Night Doctor	Arata Fukazawa	CX	
2022	Hissatsu Shigotonin	Inokichi Myojin	ABC	
2023	SukiSuki WanWan	Kotaro Yukii	NTV	

==== Programs ====
Year	Title	Network	Ref.
2019	Denjiro The Jikken	CX	
2019–2021	Mikkai Restaurant	NHK	
2020	24 hours TV 43	NTV	
2021–2023	VS Damashii	CX	
2021	24 hours TV 44	NTV	
2022	Kinpuru	NTV	

=== Film ===
Year	Title	Role	Notes	Ref.
2014	Kamen Teacher Movie	Shishimaru		
2016	Defying Kurosaki-kun	Yusuke Kaji		
2018	Nisekoi	Shu Maiko		
2023	G-Men	Shōta Kadomatsu	Lead role	

== Stage ==
Year	Title	Role	Ref.
2011	Takizawa Kabuki 2011	Taromaru	
2011	SUMMARY 2011		
2011	Shonentachi Koshi Naki Rogoku (少年たち 格子無き牢獄)		
2011	Kis-My-Ft2 with Johnny's Jr.		
2012	Johnny's Dome Theatre 〜SUMMARY〜		
2013	Endless SHOCK	Yuta	
2014	JOHNNYS' 2020 WORLD		
2014	Endless SHOCK	Yuta	
2015	JOHNNYS' World		
2015	Endless SHOCK 15th Anniversary	Yuta	
2016	JOHNNYS' Future World		
2017	JOHNNYS' ALL STARS IsLAND		
2017	JOHNNYS' YOU&ME IsLAND		
2018	JOHNNYS' Happy New Year IsLAND		
2019	JOHNNYS' King & Prince IsLAND		
2019	DREAM BOYS	Yuta	
2020	DREAM BOYS	Yuta	

== Commercials ==
Year	Title	Notes	Ref.
2015	Tongari Corn		
2020	Duo The Cleansing Balm		
2021	SERAO "38 colors mask"		
2021	Duo The Face Wash Revolution		
2024	Ikeda Mohando "Hibi Care Pad"		
2025	Banana Republic Japan Spring 2025		
2026	Hyatt Corporation "World of Hyatt"	Brand ambassador	

== Awards ==
Year	Award	Category	Nominated work(s)	Result	Ref.
2015	TVnavi Drama of the Year 2015	Best New Actor	Oniichan Gacha	Won	
2022	25th Nikkan Sports Drama Grand Prix	Best Supporting Actor	Night Doctor	Won	
2023	The 36th Nikkan Sports Film Award	Fan Voted Best Actor and Best Picture Awards	G-Men	Won	
