= Sho Hirano =

Japanese singer and actor (born 1997)

- 平野 紫耀
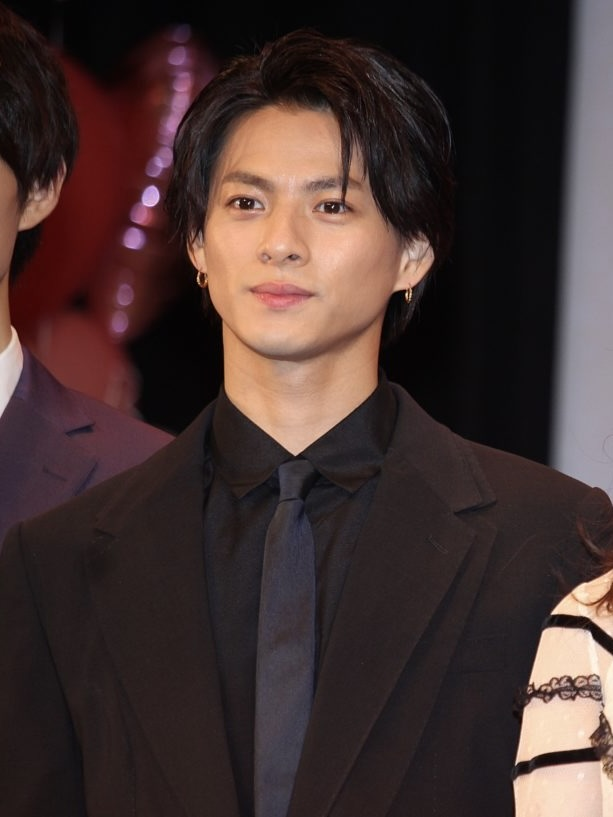
- Sho Hirano at a press conference for the movie Kaguya-sama Final: Love Is War.
- Born: 29 January 1997 (age 29); Nagoya, Japan
- Occupations: Singer; actor; television personality
- Years active: 2010–present
- Agent: Tobe
- Height: 171 cm (5 ft 7 in)
- Musical career
- Genre: J-pop
- Labels: Johnny's Universe; Tobe Music
- Member of: Number i
- Formerly of: Boys and Men; King & Prince

Sho Hirano (平野 紫耀, Hirano Shō; born 29 January 1997) is a Japanese singer and actor. He is a member of the boy band Number i. Previously, Hirano was part of Johnny & Associates as a trainee (known as Johnny's Jr.) and was a member of Mr. King, later debuting as King & Prince in 2018. He left the group and the agency on May 22, 2023.

== History ==
=== Early life ===
Sho Hirano was born in Nagoya, Japan. He started learning dance when he was in the second grade of elementary school and started doing acrobatics when he was in the second grade of junior high school. He used to belong to Central Japan, a Nagoya-based entertainment agency. In April 2010, he joined the predecessor project of Boys and Men and became an early member who performed on stages and appeared at events. In the early days, BOYS AND MEN did not disclose information about members leaving the group but in September 2011, Tenki Shimizu mentioned that Sho left the group.

=== Career in Johnny and Associates ===
When he went to Tokyo for a dance school training camp, he took lessons from Bobby Yoshino, who had choreographed Hikaru Genji and Shonentai, and was introduced to Johnny Kitagawa on the spot, so he joined Johnny & Associates in February 2012 without auditioning.

He started his activities as a member of Kansai Johnny's Jr. At that time, he was living in Nagoya and was asked by the agency whether he would join Tokyo-based Johnny's Jr. or Kansai-based Johnny's Jr. He chose Kansai Johnny's Jr. because he wanted to improve his dance skills before he appear in public. His first performance after joining the agency was at a Sexy Zone concert. Shortly after joining the agency, he joined Kin Kan (King of Kansai), a unit of Koji Mukai and Toma Kaneuchi, and became an active member of that unit. After commuting from Nagoya to Kansai for work and lessons, he moved his residence to Tokyo.

In 2014, he played the leading role in his first TV drama, SHARK. In June 2015, he became an official supporter of TV Asahi's event "TV Asahi Roppongi Hills Summer Festival SUMMER STATION" and was selected as a member of Mr. King from the limited time unit, Mr. King vs Mr. Prince. It was later announced that the unit will continue and from 2016 onwards he continued as a member of Mr. King. In 2016, at the age of 19, he became the youngest chairperson of the Hakataza Theater in Fukuoka by starring in “Johnny’s Future World from Teigeki to Hakata."

In 2018, he starred in the films “Honey” and "You, I Love”. In April of the same year, he also made his first appearance in a serial drama as Haruto Kaguragi in the TBS drama “Boys Over Flowers Season 2”. He made his CD debut on May 23 under Universal Music Japan as King & Prince with the theme song "Cinderella Girl.”

In October 2022, he played the lead role, Koshiro Kurosaki in "Kurosagi" and in December he won the 26th Nikkan Sports Drama Grand Prix Autumn Drama Best Actor Award.

In January 2023, he won the 2022 TV station Drama Awards Best Actor Award and in February, he won the 114th The Television Drama Academy Awards Best Actor Award.

On November 4, 2022, it was announced that he, along with Yuta Kishi and Yuta Jinguji, would leave King & Prince and Johnny & Associates on 22 May 2023 (Kishi would leave the agency later).

=== Career in TOBE ===
Hirano was announced together with Jinguji as the new members of Hideaki Takizawa's new talent agency TOBE on 7 July 2023. On 15 October, Yuta Kishi was announced as the newest member of TOBE. He, Hirano and Jinguji were chosen as the members of the new group "Number i"

Hirano was appointed as brand ambassador for Louis Vuitton Japan on January 7, 2025. Hirano was in Paris for the brand's Fall/Winter 2025 campaign. He returned to Paris in June for the Spring–Summer 2026 campaign.

== Filmography ==
=== Stage ===
Year	Title	Role	Ref.
2010	Straight Drive!	Daiki Tashiro (young)	
2014	Dream Boys		
2015	2015 Shinshun Johnnys' World		
2015	Johnny's Ginza 2015		
2016	TV Asahi Roppongi Hills Summer Festival Summer Station Johnny's Mr. King		
2016	Johnny's Future World from Teigeki to Hakata		
2016	Johnny's Future World		
2019	Johnny's Island		

=== TV dramas ===
Year	Title	Role	Network	Ref.
2011	Chūgakusei Nikki "Jikkyō Shōjo"		NHK E	
2014	SHARK	Mizuki Kurata	NTV	
2014	Shark: 2nd Season	Mizuki Kurata	NTV	
2018	Boys Over Flowers Season 2	Haruto Kaguragi	TBS	
2020	Detective Novice	Jiro Ichinose	NTV	
2021	A School Where Students Can Get a Second Chance at Life	Soichi Kiyama	NTV	
2022	Kurosagi	Koshiro Kurosaki	TBS	

=== Films ===
Year	Title	Role	Notes	Ref.
2014	Shinobu Jani Sanjō! Mirai e no Tatakai	West Ninja Houji		
2018	Honey	Taiga Onise	Lead role	
2018	You, I Love	Rin Izumi	Lead role	
2019	Kaguya-sama: Love Is War	Miyuki Shirogane	Lead role	
2021	Kaguya-sama Final: Love Is War	Miyuki Shirogane	Lead role	

=== Advertisements ===
Year	Title	Ref.
2013	Thirty One Ice Cream "GW 31% Off Campaign", "Happy 4 You Campaign"	
2017	Otsuka Foods Company "Vitamin Tansan Match"	
2019	Recruit "Town Work"	
2021	Hulu Japan	
2021	Ikeda Mohando Pharmaceutical "Muhi"	
2022	Kose Cosmeport "Je l'aime IP"	
2022	Kose "Sensitive Skin Care Campaign"	
2022	Kikkoman "My House is a Yakiniku Restaurant"	
2022	Bausch & Lomb Japan	
2022	P&G Febreze	
2025–	Louis Vuitton	

=== Music videos ===
Year	Title
2015	Sexy Zone "Cha-Cha-Cha Champion"

== Awards ==
Year	Award	Category	Nominated work(s)	Result	Ref.
2019	44th Hochi Film Awards	Best New Artist	Kaguya-sama: Love Is War	Nominated	
2020	2020 TV Station Drama Awards	Best Actor	Detective Novice	Won	
2022	26th Nikkan Sports Drama Grand Prix (Autumn)	Best Actor	Kurosagi	Won	
2023	2022 TV Station Drama Awards	Best Actor	Kurosagi	Won	
2023	114th The Television Drama Academy Awards	Best Actor	Kurosagi	Won	
2023	26th Nikkan Sports Drama Grand Prix	Best Actor	Kurosagi	Won	
