= Shinbashi Enbujō =

- 新橋演舞場
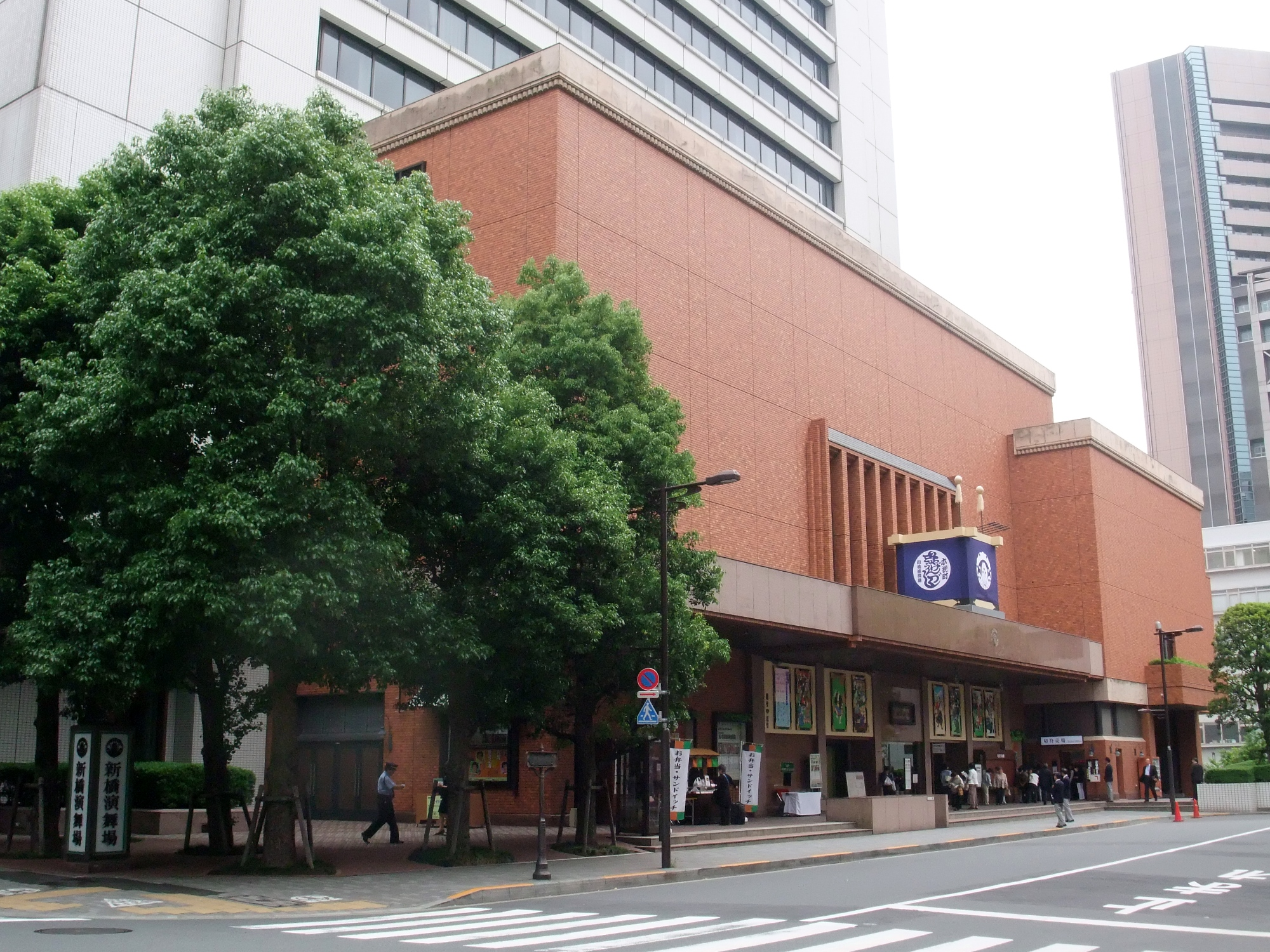
- Shinbashi Enbujō
- Interactive map of Shinbashi Enbujō
- Address: 東京都中央区銀座六丁目18番2号 Ginza 6-18-2, Chūō-ku; Tokyo; Japan
- Coordinates: 35.666913°N 139.767007°E
- Owner: Enbujō Service Corporation
- Operator: Shochiku
- Capacity: 1,428
- Type: Kabuki theater

Construction
- Opened: 1925
- Rebuilt: 1948, 1982

Website
- www.shinbashi-enbujo.co.jp/

The Shinbashi Enbujō (新橋演舞場, "Shinbashi Playhouse" or "Shinbashi Theatre") is a theatre in the Ginza neighborhood of Tokyo, Japan. It is a major kabuki venue, though other types of performances take place there as well.

== History ==
The theatre was originally built in 1925 to provide a venue for the Azuma Odori geisha dance performances, by Kawamura Tokutarō, manager of the Morikawa geisha house, who raised two million yen in capital and established the Shinbashi Enbujō Corporation. The site, by chance, was formerly that of the Matsudaira clan residence which serves as the setting for the kabuki play "Kagamiyama Kokyō no Nishikie." Construction began in 1923, and was halted following the 1923 Great Kantō earthquake, but was completed in 1925.

The theatre entered into a contract in 1940 with Shōchiku, a major film and theatre production company, today the chief kabuki production company.

Since becoming associated with Shochiku, the theatre has regularly seen productions ranging from modern drama and musicals to the shinpa (New School) genre developed in the Meiji period, as well as kabuki. The Kabuki-za, located several blocks away, is the chief kabuki theatre in the world. It plays somewhat the role of a storehouse of tradition, and its stage is usually dominated by the top star actors in the genre. By contrast, many more experimental forms within the kabuki genre, as well as plays starring younger actors, are performed at the Shinbashi Enbujō. These include the Super Kabuki form pioneered by Ichikawa Ennosuke III, which incorporates Western music, Chinese, Indian, and other non-Japanese stylistic influences, and over-the-top stage special effects beyond that seen in typical kabuki, and the hanagata kabuki (花形歌舞伎, lit. "star actor kabuki" or "floral pattern kabuki") performances featuring the younger generation of kabuki stars.

The building was destroyed in the Allied bombing of Tokyo during World War II, but was reconstructed in 1948. Major renovations were undertaken in 1982, incorporating technological upgrades, extra seating, and expanding to take over the nearby Nissan Motors Building.

The Shinbashi Enbujō was the main kabuki theater from 2010 until March 2013 while the Kabuki-za theater was undergoing construction.
