= King & Prince =

Japanese boy band

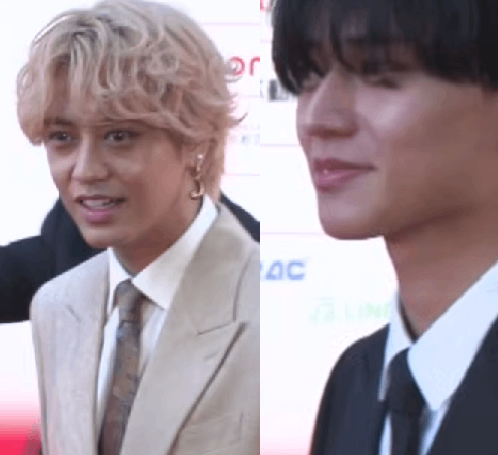
- Kaito Takahashi (left) and Ren Nagase (right) at the 2026 Music Awards Japan

Background information
- Also known as: Mr. King vs Mr. Prince (2015–2017)
- Origin: Tokyo, Japan
- Genre: J-pop
- Years active: 2018–present
- Label: Project K&P
- Members: Ren Nagase; Kaito Takahashi
- Past members: Genki Iwahashi; Sho Hirano; Yuta Kishi; Yuta Jinguji
- Website: Universal-music official Starto Ent. official

King & Prince is a two-member Japanese idol group under Starto Entertainment (formerly of Johnny & Associates) that debuted in 2018. Their debut was announced at a press conference on 17 January 2018 along with the establishment of Johnny & Associates' new record label under Universal Music, Johnny's Universe (now Project K&P), with King & Prince becoming the first artists to sign under the label. They have sold 12.3 million physical copies in Japan.

The group used to have six members: Sho Hirano, Ren Nagase, Kaito Takahashi, Yuta Kishi, Yuta Jinguji and Genki Iwahashi. However, Genki Iwahashi withdrew from King & Prince on 31 March 2021 due to anxiety disorder. Three of the remaining five members left the group on 22 May 2023. Sho Hirano and Yuta Jinguji left the agency on the same day, while Yuta Kishi remained until fall of 2023.

== History ==
=== 2015–2017: Beginnings ===
Johnny & Associates announced the group's formation in a press conference on 5 June 2015. The group was formed to be special supporters for TV Asahi's Summer Station event. Mr. King vs Mr. Prince was divided into two subgroups: "Mr. King", consisting of Sho Hirano, Ren Nagase, and Kaito Takahashi and "Mr. Prince", consisting of Yuta Kishi, Yuta Jinguji, and Genki Iwahashi. Producer Johnny Kitagawa chose their name in hopes that each member would "spark off each other" and "improve themselves through friendly rivalry". The group's first original song, "Summer Station" was used as the official theme song for the Summer Station event, which ran from July to August 2015. The group was meant to disband after the event. However, in August 2015, the members announced that they would continue activities as a group.

By 2016, Mr. Prince had changed their name to "Prince" and the six members predominately worked within their respective units. Mr. King released a photo book and were special supporters for Summer Station 2016, while Prince performed in the Johnny's Ginza musical and started to host their own variety show, Mayonaka no Prince. In September 2017, the six members performed in the Johnny's Jr. concert Summer Sta (Kimi ga) King's Treasure. After the concert, they asked Johnny Kitagawa to let them debut together.

=== 2018–present: Debut and success ===
On 17 January 2018, their debut was announced in a press conference, along with the establishment of Johnny & Associates' new record label under Universal Music, Johnny's Universe, with King & Prince becoming the first artists to sign under the label. Their debut single "Cinderella Girl" was released on 23 May 2018. It was used as the theme song for the drama Boys Over Flowers Season 2 which stars member Sho Hirano. "Cinderella Girl" was a commercial success; it sold over 577,000 copies in its first week, making it the first debut single in over 12 years to exceed initial sales of 500,000 copies. This also made it the most commercially successful debut of the decade. By late June King & Prince had become the highest earning new artist, with a total gross of ¥870,000,000. In September 2018, "Cinderella Girl" was certified 3× Platinum by the Recording Industry Association of Japan (RIAJ) for shipments of 750,000 units.

Following the success of "Cinderella Girl", King & Prince embarked on a nationwide arena tour titled King & Prince First Concert Tour 2018. The tour began in August at the Yokohama Arena with a sold-out show to 15,000 guests. When the tour concluded, the audience totaled about 260,000 fans. On 10 October 2018, King & Prince released their second single titled "Memorial". The single was used as the theme song for the television drama Bukatsu, Suki Janakya Dame Desu ka? starring members Kaito Takahashi, Yuta Jinguji, and Genki Iwahashi. Another song included in the single, "High On Love", was used as the theme song for the film You, I Love which stars member Hirano. "Memorial" sold more than 400,000 copies in its first week, and topped the Oricon Singles Chart. In the same month of release, it was certified 2× Platinum by the RIAJ for shipments of 500,000 units.

In November 2018, Genki Iwahashi went on hiatus indefinitely to concentrate on treatment for his panic disorder. The group's management announced in February 2019 that he would rejoin the group and participate on their third single, "Kimi wo Matteru", but in March it was noted that he was to continue receiving treatment. On 31 March 2021, Genki Iwahashi officially left King & Prince and retired from the entertainment industry.

On 23 May 2021, the third anniversary of their CD debut, King & Prince official Twitter and Instagram accounts, YouTube channel were opened at 5:23 am. Starting with their first single "Cinderella Girl" and music videos for the singles released in the past were shown on a daily basis until the same day on YouTube. The first terrestrial TV program " King & Prince Ru. " has started since 30 May 2021. When the first Instagram live was held, they announced the release of their third album and a tour with over 400,000 people watching.

From 21 to 22 August, they served as the main personality on "24 Hour TV Love Will Save the Earth" which was broadcast live on Nippon Television Network Corporation.

In December, It ranked third (873,000) in the ranking of 2021 YouTube new channel subscribers in Japan.

On 1 January 2022, their crown program " King & Prince Ru. " was aired as a New Year's Day special on a nationwide network, and regular broadcasts began on 16 January.

From 2 April, they embarked on their first 4-dome tour " King & Prince First DOME TOUR 2022 - Mr. ".

On 4 November 2022, it was reported that Yuta Kishi, Yuta Jinguji and Sho Hirano would be leaving the group on 22 May 2023, and the agency, that day for Hirano and Jinguji, and in Autumn for Kishi. The two remaining members continued with the group's name.

Starting 1 July 2023, King and Prince's new program, Kintore (temporary name), took over the timeslot of their previous program, King & Prince Ru. The program's premise is to present economic themes in a variety format.

=== 2024: 6th anniversary and digital song release ===
On 4 May 2024, it was revealed that on their 6th anniversary, on the 23, 63 of their songs, included on their single, Halfmoon / Moooove!!, and their compilation album, Mr.5, would be released in digital form to download and stream. The songs "Halfmoon" and "Moooove!!" were pre-released on the 20th. That same month it was announced that the duo had established King & Prince Co., Ltd., and signed a group agent agreement with STARTO. It was the third group after Tokio and Arashi.

=== 2026 ===
After two and a half years on the air, it was announced on January 10, 2026, that the pair's crown program "Kintore" would end in March. When questioned by the media in regards to the motive of the cancellation, NTV, the network responsible for its airing, did not respond.

== Members ==
=== Current ===
- Ren Nagase (2018–present)
- Kaito Takahashi (2018–present)

=== Former ===
- Genki Iwahashi (2018–2021)
- Sho Hirano (2018–2023)
- Yuta Kishi (2018–2023)
- Yuta Jinguji (2018–2023)

== Discography ==
King & Prince discography
- Studio albums: 7
- EPs: 6
- Compilation albums: 6
- Singles: 23
- Video albums: 7

=== Albums ===
==== Studio albums ====
List of studio albums, with selected chart positions, certifications and sales
Title	Details	Peak chart positions				Sales	Certifications
Title	Details	JPN	JPN Comb	JPN Hot	TWN EA	Sales	Certifications
King & Prince	Released: 19 June 2019 (JPN); Label: Johnny's Universe; Formats: CD/Blu-ray, CD/DVD, CD	1	1	1	—	JPN: 622,892	RIAJ: 2× Platinum
L&	Released: 2 September 2020 (JPN); Label: Johnny's Universe; Formats: CD/DVD, CD	1	1	1	1	JPN: 667,435	RIAJ: 2× Platinum
Re:Sense	Released: 21 July 2021 (JPN); Label: Johnny's Universe; Formats: CD/DVD, CD	1	1	1	3	JPN: 551,223	RIAJ: 2× Platinum
Made In	Released: 29 June 2022 (JPN); Label: Johnny's Universe; Formats: CD, CD/DVD	1	1	1	1	JPN: 600,671	RIAJ: 2× Platinum
Peace	Released: 16 August 2023 (JPN); Label: Johnny's Universe; Formats: CD, CD/DVD, digital download, streaming	1	1	1	1	JPN: 341,758	RIAJ: Platinum
Re:Era	Released: 14 October 2024 (digital); 11 December 2024 (CD); Label: Project K&P; Formats: CD, CD/DVD, digital download, streaming	1	1	1	1	JPN: 233,485	RIAJ: Platinum
Starring	Released: 24 December 2025; Label: Project K&P; Formats: CD, CD/DVD, digital download, streaming	1	1	1	1	JPN: 250,124	RIAJ: Platinum
"—" denotes a recording that did not chart or was not released in that territory.

==== Compilation albums ====
List of compilation albums, with selected chart positions and sales
Title	Details	Peak chart positions				Sales	Certifications
Title	Details	JPN	JPN Comb	JPN Hot	TWN EA	Sales	Certifications
Mr.5	Released: 19 April 2023; Label: Johnny's Universe; Formats: CD	1	1	1	1	JPN: 1,376,482	RIAJ: Million
Mr.5 (Special Edition)	Released: 23 May 2024; Label: Project K&P; Formats: Digital download, streaming	—	6	—	—		
King & Prince On Air Romantic	Released: 4 August 2024; Label: Universal Music; Formats: Streaming	—	—	—	—		
King & Prince On Air in the Car	Released: 11 August 2024; Label: Universal Music; Formats: Streaming	—	—	—	—		
King & Prince On Air Sweet Dreams	Released: 18 August 2024; Label: Universal Music; Formats: Streaming	—	—	—	—		
King & Prince On Air Fun & Happy Mood	Released: 25 August 2024; Label: Universal Music; Formats: Streaming	—	—	—	—		
"—" denotes a recording that did not chart or was not released in that territory.

==== Video albums ====
List of video albums, with selected chart positions, certifications and sales
Title	Details	Peak chart positions		Sales	Certifications
Title	Details	JPN DVD	JPN BD	Sales	Certifications
King & Prince First Concert Tour 2018	Released: 12 December 2018; Label: Johnny's Universe; Formats: DVD, Blu-ray	1	1	JPN: 413,724	RIAJ: Platinum
King & Prince Concert Tour 2019	Released: 15 January 2020; Label: Johnny's Universe; Formats: DVD, Blu-ray	1	1	JPN: 417,605	RIAJ: Platinum
King & Prince Concert Tour 2020: L&	Released: 24 February 2021; Label: Johnny's Universe; Formats: DVD, Blu-ray	1	1	JPN: 330,662	RIAJ: Platinum
King & Prince Concert Tour 2021: Re:Sense	Released: 12 January 2022; Label: Johnny's Universe; Formats: DVD, Blu-ray	1	1	JPN: 379,874	
King & Prince First Dome Tour 2022: Mr.	Released: 18 January 2023; Label: Universal Music; Formats: DVD, Blu-ray	1	1	JPN: 620,087	RIAJ: 2× Platinum
King & Prince Arena Tour 2022: Made In	Released: 22 March 2023; Label: Universal Music; Formats: DVD, Blu-ray	1	1	JPN: 528,000	RIAJ: 2× Platinum
King & Prince Live Tour 2023: Peace	Released: 13 March 2024; Label: Universal Music; Formats: DVD, Blu-ray	1	1	JPN: 164,912	RIAJ: Gold

=== Extended plays ===
List of EPs, with selected chart positions and sales
Title	Details	Peak chart positions			Certifications
Title	Details	JPN	JPN Comb	JPN Hot	Certifications
Halfmoon / Moooove!! (Special Edition)	Released: 23 May 2024; Label: Project K&P; Formats: Digital download, streaming	—	12	—	
Nanimono (Special Edition)	Released: 18 December 2024; Label: Project K&P; Formats: Digital download, streaming	—	— (Note: Nanimono (Special Edition) did not enter the Oricon Combined Albums Chart, but peaked at number 4 on the Oricon Digital Albums Chart.)	—	
Itoshi Ikiru Kotō / Magic Word (Special Edition)	Released: 18 December 2024; Label: Project K&P; Formats: Digital download, streaming	—	— (Note: Itoshi Ikiru Kotō / Magic Word (Special Edition) did not enter the Oricon Combined Albums Chart, but peaked at number 6 on the Oricon Digital Albums Chart.)	—	
Heart (Special Edition)	Released: 12 March 2025; Label: Project K&P; Formats: Digital download, streaming	—	— (Note: Heart (Special Edition) did not enter the Oricon Combined Albums Chart, but peaked at number 3 on the Oricon Digital Albums Chart.)	—	
Spotlight Remixes	Released: 24 April 2025; Label: Project K&P; Formats: Digital download, streaming	—	—	—	
So Honey EP	Released: 2 September 2026; Label: Project K&P; Formats: CD, digital download, streaming	1	1	1	RIAJ: Gold
"—" denotes a recording that did not chart or was not released in that territory.

=== Singles ===
List of singles, with selected chart positions, certifications and sales
Title	Year	Peak chart positions				Sales	Certifications	Album
Title	Year	JPN	JPN Comb (Note: The Oricon Combined Singles Chart was established on December 24, 2018.)	JPN Hot	TWN EA	Sales	Certifications	Album
"Cinderella Girl"	2018	1	4 (Note: Peaked in 2023.)	1	—	JPN: 934,996	RIAJ: Million	King & Prince
"Memorial"	2018	1	32	1	—	JPN: 572,919	RIAJ: 2× Platinum	King & Prince
"Kimi o Matteru"	2019	1	1	1	—	JPN: 502,390	RIAJ: 2× Platinum	King & Prince
"Koi-Wazurai"	2019	1	1	1	—	JPN: 493,973	RIAJ: 2× Platinum	L&
"Mazy Night"	2020	1	1	1	1	JPN: 621,596	RIAJ: 2× Platinum	L&
"I Promise"	2020	1	1	1	3	JPN: 629,672	RIAJ: 2× Platinum	Re:Sense
"Magic Touch"	2021	1	1	1	3	JPN: 538,599	RIAJ: 2× Platinum	Re:Sense
"Beating Hearts"	2021	1	1	—	3	JPN: 538,599	RIAJ: 2× Platinum	Re:Sense
"Koi Furu Tsukiyo ni Kimi Omou"	2021	1	1	1	1	JPN: 518,792	RIAJ: 2× Platinum	Made In
"Lovin' You"	2022	1	1	1	1	JPN: 526,994	RIAJ: 2× Platinum	Made In
"Odoruyō ni Jinsei o"	2022	1	1	—	1	JPN: 526,994	RIAJ: 2× Platinum	Made In
"TraceTrace"	2022	1	1	1	—	JPN: 595,580	RIAJ: 2× Platinum	Mr. 5
"Tsukiyomi"	2022	1	1	1	—	JPN: 1,184,521	RIAJ: Million; RIAJ: Gold (st.)	Mr. 5
"Irodori"	2022	1	1	—	—	JPN: 1,184,521	RIAJ: Million	Mr. 5
"Life Goes On"	2023	1	1	1	—	JPN: 1,084,536	RIAJ: Million	Mr. 5
"We Are Young"	2023	1	1	—	—	JPN: 1,084,536	RIAJ: Million	Mr. 5
"Nanimono"	2023	1	1	2	—	JPN: 562,421	RIAJ: 2× Platinum	Peace
"Itoshi Ikiru Kotō"	2023	1	1	3	—	JPN: 348,375	RIAJ: Platinum	Re:Era
"Magic Word"	2023	1	1	—	—	JPN: 348,375	RIAJ: Platinum	Re:Era
"Halfmoon"	2024	1	1	1	—	JPN: 305,258	RIAJ: Platinum	Re:Era
"Moooove!!"	2024	1	1	34	—	JPN: 305,258	RIAJ: Platinum	Re:Era
"Heart"	2025	1	1	1	—	JPN: 317,467	RIAJ: Platinum	Starring
"What We Got (Kiseki wa Kimi to)"	2025	1	1	1	—	JPN: 320,336	RIAJ: Platinum	Starring
"I Know"	2025	1	1	31	—	JPN: 320,336	RIAJ: Platinum	Starring
"Waltz for Lily"	2026	1	1	1	—	JPN: 312,622	RIAJ: Platinum	Non-album single
"—" denotes a recording that did not chart or was not released in that territory.

=== Promotional singles ===
List of promotional singles, with selected chart positions, certifications and sales
Title	Year	Peak chart positions		Album
Title	Year	JPN Comb (Note: The Oricon Combined Singles Chart was established on December 24, 2018.)	JPN Hot	Album
"Wow"	2024	21	5	Re:Era
"Theater"	2025	4	2	Starring
"So Honey"	2026	12	6	So Honey EP

=== Other charted songs ===
List of songs, with selected chart positions, certifications and sales
Title	Year	Peak chart positions	Album
Title	Year	JPN Hot	Album
"Naughty Girl"	2019	97	King & Prince
"&Love"	2020	81	L&
"Namae Oshiete"	2021	61	Re:Sense
"Ichiban"	2022	48	Made In
"I My Me Mine"	2025	96	"Heart" (single)
"Kibō no Oka"	2025	35	Starring
"Usudayo Sukidayo"	2026	80	So Honey EP

=== Other songs ===
Title	Year	Name
"Summer Station" (サマー・ステーション)	2015	Mr.King vs. Mr.Prince
"Bounce to Night"	2015	Mr.King vs. Mr.Prince
"Jōnetsu no Iro" (情熱の色)	2016	Mr.King
"Oh! Summer King" (OH!サマーKING)	2016	Mr.King
"Alright"	2017	Mr.King
"Beautiful World"	2017	Mr.King
"Prince Princess"	2017	Prince
"For the Glory"	2017	Prince
"Egaita Mirai (Tadoritsuku Made)" (描いた未来〜たどり着くまで〜)	2018	Prince
"You Are My Princess"	2018	Prince

== Concert tours ==
Year	Name	Venue and date	Ref.
2025	King & Prince Live Tour 24-25 ~Re:Era~ in Dome	Mizuho PayPay Dome Fukuoka (10-11 May 2025); Tokyo Dome (10-12 July 2025); Kyocera Dome Osaka (19-21 July 2025)	

== Awards and nominations ==
Year	Award	Category	Nominee / work	Result	Ref.
2018	97th Television Drama Academy Awards	Best Theme Song	"Cinderella Girl"	Nominated	
2018	Yahoo! Japan Search Awards	Grand Prize	King & Prince	Won	
2018	Yahoo! Japan Search Awards	Idol Category	King & Prince	Won	
2019	33rd Japan Gold Disc Award	New Artist of the Year	King & Prince	Won	
2019	33rd Japan Gold Disc Award	Best 5 New Artists	King & Prince	Won	
2019	GQ Men of the Year 2019	Pop Icons of the Year	King & Prince	Won	
2019	2019 MPA Awards	Hit Song Award (JASRAC)	"Cinderella Girl"	Won	
2020	34th Japan Gold Disc Award	Best 5 Albums	King & Prince	Won	
2021	35th Japan Gold Disc Award	Best 5 Albums	L&	Won	
2021	35th Japan Gold Disc Award	Best 3 Music Videos	King & Prince Concert Tour 2019	Won	
2022	36th Japan Gold Disc Award	Best 5 Albums	Re:Sense	Won	
2023	37th Japan Gold Disc Award	Best 5 Albums	Made In	Won	
2023	37th Japan Gold Disc Award	Single of the Year	"Tsukiyomi" / "Irodori"	Won	
2023	37th Japan Gold Disc Award	Best 5 Singles	"Tsukiyomi" / "Irodori"	Won	
2023	37th Japan Gold Disc Award	Best 3 Music Videos	King & Prince CONCERT TOUR 2021 ～Re:Sense～	Won	
2024	38th Japan Gold Disc Award	Album of the Year	Mr. 5	Won	
2024	38th Japan Gold Disc Award	Best 5 Albums	Mr. 5	Won	
2024	38th Japan Gold Disc Award	Best 5 Albums	Peace	Won	
2024	38th Japan Gold Disc Award	Single of the Year	"Life Goes On" / "We Are Young"	Won	
2024	38th Japan Gold Disc Award	Best 5 Singles	"Life Goes On" / "We Are Young"	Won	
2024	38th Japan Gold Disc Award	Best 3 Music Videos	King & Prince First DOME TOUR 2022 〜Mr.〜	Won	
2025	39th Japan Gold Disc Award	Best 3 Music Videos	King & Prince Live Tour 2023 〜Peace〜	Won	
