= Problemista (soundtrack) =

Problemista (Original Motion Picture Soundtrack)

Film score by Lia Ouyang Rusli
- Released: March 15, 2024
- Recorded: 2022–2023
- Genre: Film score
- Length: 65:07
- Label: A24 Music
- Producer: Randall Dunn

Lia Ouyang Rusli chronology
Bruiser (2023)	Problemista (2024)	Happyend (2024)

Problemista (Original Motion Picture Soundtrack) is the soundtrack album to the 2023 film Problemista directed by Julio Torres, who also starred alongside RZA, Greta Lee and Tilda Swinton. The album featured 53 tracks composed by Lia Ouyang Rusli and released through A24 Music on March 15, 2024.

== Development ==
Lia Ouyang Rusli composed the film score for Problemista. She joined the project during November 2021, when Torres asked about her involvement which she ultimately agreed. She liked Torres' work, which led her to work on the film's music at her residency. She crafted using the ideas of balkan choir, ritualistic chant, 1970s and 1980s synthesizers, orchestral minimalism combined for a surrealistic element. Having likened towards Torres' script and the actors' performances, Rusli noted that Torres gave her freedom to embrace her creativity with the two acknowledging on how the score amplified the stakes of the film to provide an eclectic feel.

Randall Dunn served as the music producer. Rusli collaborated with New York-based musicians and artists, because of Dunn who assembled artists from the locality handpicking a choir, string ensembles and percussionists. This was instrumental in bringing the synthesizers for the film score, as much of the film was driven by synths. Dunn brought several analog synths and MIDIs, as well as VSTs and Ensoniq Fizmo synthesizers, which he mixed and modified with virtual synths to provide a widespread sound.

Rusli had an idea to invent a language for the choir to sing fragmented syllables of words representing each character's deepest desires and fears. This provided a "gibberish" sound at easy listen, but the syllables align in a way where certain words are recognizable. As a result, the choir acted as a Greek chorus representing the journey of each character. Much of the score titles are based on the dialogues from the film; Rusli took phrases from scenes in the film the music is playing and used them for titles. Inspired by Mica Levi's work for Under the Skin (2013), Rusli used grounded samples of organic instrumentation to provide creepy sounds in the Devil's Interval sequence. Throughout the score, Rusli sampled the synths and choir in the most unconventional methods, to give an otherworldly feel.

Rusli was involved in the editing process in order to use her tracks as placeholders for temp music instead of score cues by other composers and felt it made the scoring process easier. The score was considered an amalgamation of choir, synths and orchestra resembling John Adams' works, as well as experimental music and sound effects. On Torres' involvement in the score, she noted "He's very trusting in the process, where he doesn't really think in instruments, it's more just like, emotions. As long as the music is doing what the scene needs, I can do it. There's like a hundred different ways to score a scene and I really had a lot of freedom to dictate that."

== Release ==
The film's original score album was announced in July 2023. Two songs: "Huele a Fraude" and "Monument to Possibilities" were released on the same time. The album was initially set to be released on the original release date on August 4, 2023, but as the film was delayed due to the 2023 Hollywood labor disputes, the album was not released on that date. Eventually, the album was released through A24 Music on March 15, 2024, two weeks after the film's release on March 1, 2024.

== Track listing ==
No.	Title	Length
1.	"Alejandro's Tower"	1:58
2.	"Overture"	3:36
3.	"Smart Phones for Cabbage Patch Kids"	0:28
4.	"Backup Disconnected!"	0:32
5.	"Meet Elizabeth"	0:17
6.	"Evil Whisper"	0:15
7.	"Dolores' Worry"	0:36
8.	"The Hourglass Room 1"	0:22
9.	"Do You Know Filemaker Pro?"	3:49
10.	"The Hourglass Room 2"	0:24
11.	"Khalil's Office"	0:18
12.	"Bureaucractic Limbo"	1:13
13.	"This Is Craigslist"	1:31
14.	"Elizabeth Mania"	0:11
15.	"I Sponsor You"	0:21
16.	"They Hate My Eggs"	0:14
17.	"Bobby and Elizabeth"	2:28
18.	"13 Eggs"	1:09
19.	"Filemaker Pro Scare"	0:33
20.	"Alejandro Vs Craigslist"	1:48
21.	"Can I Ask You a Question About Your Hair?"	0:10
22.	"Bureaucractic Limbo" (Reprise)	0:19
23.	"Bingham"	0:08
24.	"Blue Egg on Yellow Satin"	0:22
25.	"Broken Hourglass"	0:22
26.	"Not Enough Money, Not Enough Eggs"	0:17
27.	"Need Subletter Immediately"	0:28
28.	"I Have to Go"	0:08
29.	"Dear Dahlia"	1:45
30.	"Painting Rush"	0:33
31.	"Is That Your Dream?"	1:42
32.	"Elizabeth in Maine"	1:06
33.	"Unsynced Databases"	0:39
34.	"The Hydra"	3:27
35.	"Debit Card"	0:34
36.	"I Stand with Bank of America"	2:13
37.	"Cleaning Boy Kink"	1:08
38.	"Who Makes the Decisions?"	1:06
39.	"We Want the Eggs"	0:39
40.	"Alejandro Vs Elizabeth"	3:48
41.	"Roosevelt Island Tram"	1:12
42.	"The Egg Is Alone in Manhattan"	1:33
43.	"All or Nothing"	1:11
44.	"The Thorn that Protects the Rose"	0:39
45.	"Dolores on the Phone"	1:11
46.	"Elizabeth's Voicemail"	3:48
47.	"Hasbro Confrontation"	0:38
48.	"Alejandro's Victory"	0:53
49.	"Monument to Possibilities"	1:24
50.	"Bibo"	1:10
51.	"Welcome to the Future"	1:54
52.	"My Little Problems" (Finale)	2:29
53.	"Huele a Fraude" (Ohyung and Stefa)	3:36

== Reception ==
Lovia Gyarkye of The Hollywood Reporter wrote "Rusli's crisp and exciting score propels us from one moment to the next." Jonathan Romney of Financial Times wrote "the humour is heavily underlined by [Rusli's] score, with its bursts of breathy choir, ticking-clock effects and that plinkety-plonk marimba that became a staple in US indie cinema in the 1990s". David Potvin of Under the Radar wrote "An original score by [Rusli] does a lot of the heavy lifting in carrying us through the film, emotionally." Eric Webb of Austin American-Statesman "Composer [Rusli's] dark synths transform grubby New York apartments into fantasy realms".

== Release history ==
Release history and formats for Problemista (Original Motion Picture Soundtrack)
Region	Date	Format(s)	Label(s)	Ref.
Various	March 15, 2024	Digital download; streaming	A24 Music	
Various	July 12, 2024	LP	A24 Music	
