= Marika Itō =

Japanese actress and illustrator (born 1996)

- 伊藤 万理華
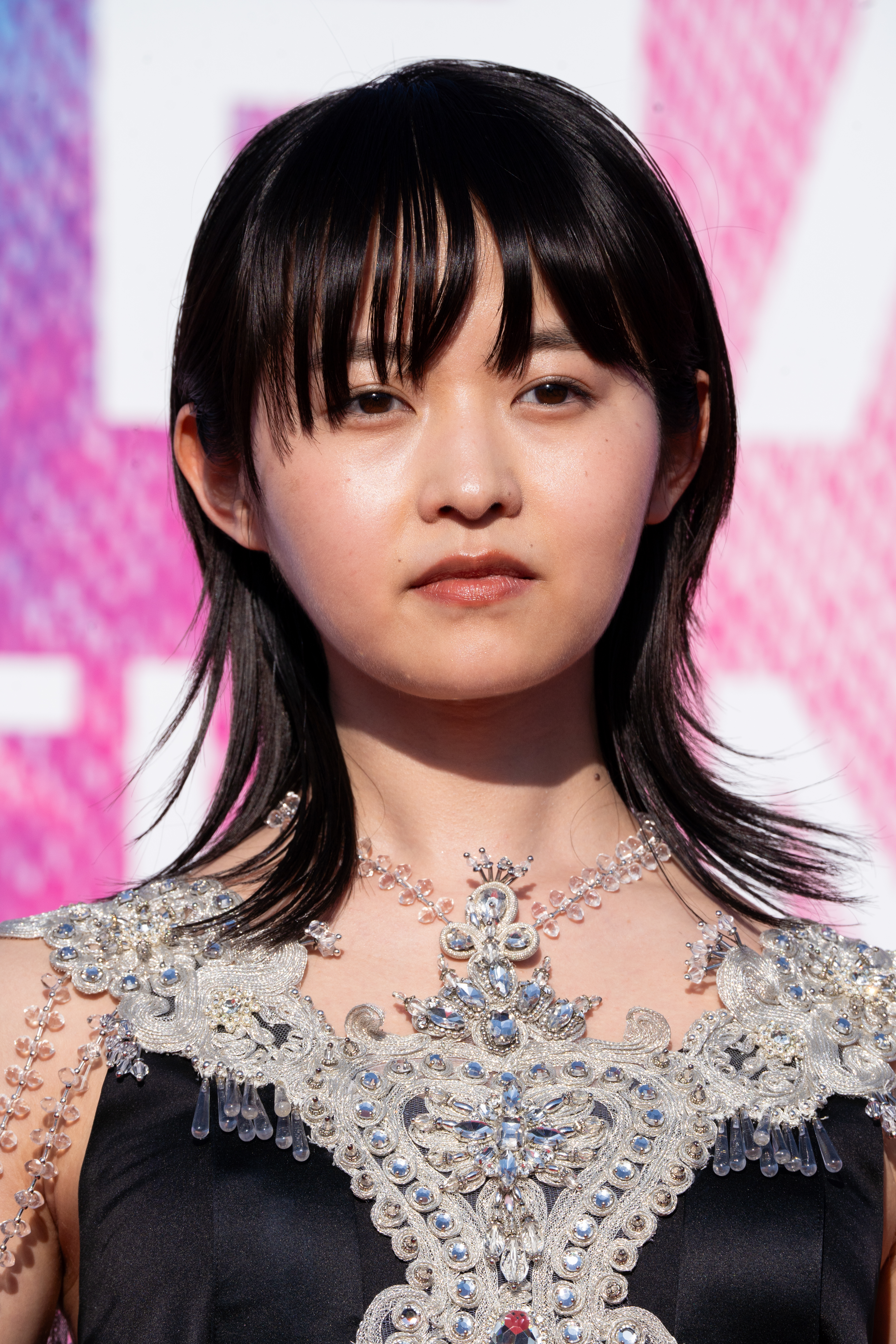
- Itō in 2024
- Born: February 20, 1996 (age 30); Osaka, Japan
- Occupations: Actress; illustrator
- Years active: 2013–present
- Notable work: Asahinagu; Eyes; Kakegurui – Compulsive Gambler
- Musical career
- Genre: J-pop
- Instrument: Vocals
- Years active: 2013–2017
- Label: Sony Records/N46Div
- Formerly of: Nogizaka46
- Website: itomarika.com

Marika Itō (伊藤 万理華, Itō Marika; born February 20, 1996) is a Japanese actress and illustrator. She is a former first generation member of the Japanese idol group Nogizaka46. She has played lead roles in the 2015 film Eyes and the 2021 film It's a Summer Film, and supporting roles in the films Asahinagu and Kakegurui – Compulsive Gambler. Her performance in It's a Summer Film was nominated for a Hochi Film Award and a Mainichi Film Award.

== Early life ==
Itō was born on February 20, 1996, in Osaka, Japan to a fashion designer mother and a graphic designer father. She began her entertainment career in 2011 by successfully auditioning for the first generation of Nogizaka46, an idol group created as the official rival of AKB48.

== Career ==
=== Nogizaka46 ===
As a Nogizaka46 member, Itō appeared in several albums, concerts, short films, music videos, and television shows, including the million-selling singles "Influencer" and "Itsuka Dekiru kara Kyō Dekiru". In 2017, at the group's sold-out first Tokyo Dome concert, Itō performed for the last time as a Nogizaka46 member. After formally leaving the group, Itō remained on the talent roster of Nogizaka46's management company.

=== Acting ===
Itō's acting career began while she was still a member of Nogizaka46. She had a minor part in the 2013 movie Bad Boys J, but her first major film role was in Eyes, an adaptation of a story by Ring author Koji Suzuki. In 2017 she played a supporting role in Asahinagu, an adaptation of the manga of the same name, for which she had to learn how to use the naginata. In 2019, Itō was cast in her first post-Nogizaka46 film role, winning a supporting role in Kakegurui – Compulsive Gambler, a film adaptation of the Homura Kawamoto manga of the same name. Later that year she played the role of Minatsu in the Kansai TV drama Junichi (潤一).

Itō's second lead role came in the 2021 film It's a Summer Film, in which she played Hadashi. Her performance earned a nomination for a Hochi Film Award for Best New Artist and a nomination for a Mainichi Film Award for Best New Actress, as well as a Best New Actress prize at the Tama Film Awards, which are part of the Tama Cinema Forum, a "people's choice film festival". The following year she appeared in supporting roles in the films To a More Transcendent Place and Sobakasu, and in several episodes of the Hikari TV series Drawing the Bath (湯あがりスケッチ). She also took on the lead role of Kurumi Enomoto, a food truck owner, in TV Tokyo's Traveling Sandwich (旅するサンドイッチ), a drama produced as part of TV Tokyo's efforts to promote regional revitalization in Takasaki.

=== Art and modeling ===
While in Nogizaka46, Itō art directed and styled several of her individual performance videos, which were included in bonus versions of singles and DVDs. Shortly before her graduation from Nogizaka46, Itō's first solo art exhibition was held in October 2017 at GALLERY X BY PARCO and featured photographs of fellow Nogizaka46 members, a room filled with objects meant to represent the contents of Itō's brain, and an original short film playing on a loop. In 2017 she also filmed her first solo commercial, for the app リクポ ("requpo"), based on a character she created and played in a Nogizaka46 music video. In 2018, Itō's photobook Étranger, for which she styled the clothing, was published. She was also selected to be the image model for the MOOSIC LAB 2018 music and film festival. In 2019 her solo art exhibition "HOMESICK" was held at Parco Gallery X in Shibuya. Itō also appeared as the sole performer in a 2022 commercial for the candy Puregumi, directed by Santa Yamagishi, who had also directed Itō in To a More Transcendent Place.

== Selected works ==
=== Films ===
Year	Title	Role	Notes	Source
2013	Bad Boys J: Saigo ni Mamoru Mono			
2015	Eyes	Yurika Yamamoto	Lead role	
2017	Asahinagu	Eri Nogami		
2019	Kakegurui – Compulsive Gambler	Tomu Inuhachi		
2021	It's a Summer Film	Hadashi	Lead role	
2022	To the Supreme!	Miwa Anzai		
2022	I Am What I Am	Mutsumi Shinohara		
2023	Manami 100%	Seo		
2023	Actress Wouldn't Cry	Saki		
2024	Cha-Cha	Cha-cha	Lead role	
2024	Oasis			
2025	The Harbor Lights	Miyu Kaneko		
2025	A Bad Summer	Yuko Miyata		
2026	The Imaginary Dog and the Lying Cat	Yori Sato		
2026	You Are the Film	Madoka	Lead role	

=== Television ===
Year	Title	Role	Notes	Source
2022	One Night Morning	Lily	Lead role; episode 2	
2025	Someday, Into Zero-Gravity Space	Haruko Kiuchi		
2026	Blossom	Kinuko Hagimiya	Asadora	

=== Animation ===
Year	Title	Role	Notes	Source
2025	Cocoon	San	Lead role	

=== Solo art exhibitions ===
- 「伊藤万理華の脳内博覧会」, Gallery X by Parco, 2017
- 「伊藤万理華の脳内博覧会」, Kyoto Nippon Festival, 2017
- “HOMESICK”, Parco Gallery X, 2019

=== Photobooks ===
- エトランゼ (Étranger), Shueisha, 2018, ISBN 9784797673517

=== Advertising ===
- "まりかっと" commercial, requpo, 2017
- "滑走路" commercial, Puregumi, 2022

== Awards and nominations ==
Year	Award	Category	Work(s)	Result	Ref
2021	46th Hochi Film Awards	Best New Artist	It's a Summer Film	Nominated	
2022	76th Mainichi Film Awards	Best New Actress	It's a Summer Film	Nominated	
