= Nogizaka46 =

Japanese idol girl group

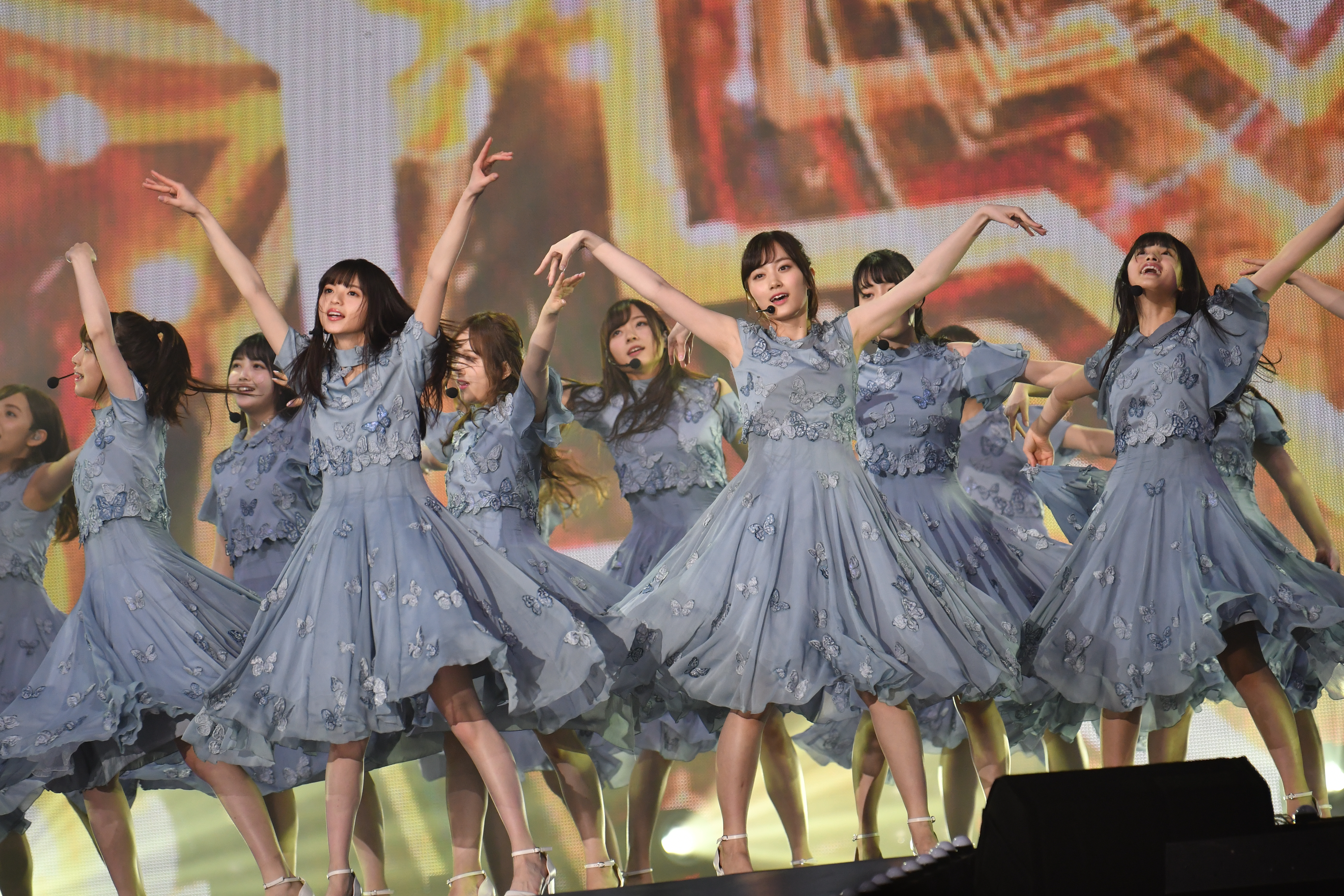
- Nogizaka46 at the 14th KKBox Music Awards in Taiwan, 2019

Background information
- Origin: Tokyo, Japan
- Genre: J-pop
- Years active: 2011–present
- Labels: Nogizaka46 LLC; Sony Music
- Members: See current members
- Past members: See graduated members
- Website: www.nogizaka46.com

Nogizaka46 (乃木坂46; Nogizaka Forty-six) is a Japanese idol girl group produced by Yasushi Akimoto, created as the "official rival" of the group AKB48. They are the first group from the Sakamichi Series, which also includes sister groups Sakurazaka46 (formerly Keyakizaka46), Yoshimotozaka46, and Hinatazaka46.

The group's musical catalogue includes forty-two singles and five studio albums. Starting with their third single, each of Nogizaka46's single releases has reached the top position on the weekly Oricon Singles Chart. The group has also created radio shows, theater productions, television programs, and films, including NogiBingo!, Hatsumori Bemars, Nogizaka Under Construction, Asahinagu, and a series of documentary films about the group.

Nogizaka46 has twice won the Grand Prix at the annual Japan Record Awards, with consecutive wins for "Influencer" in 2017 and "Synchronicity" in 2018. The group has sold nearly 18 million CDs in Japan. Their releases have also included singles, albums, and other recorded material issued through the Japanese music market.

== History ==
=== 2011–2012: Formation and early chart success ===
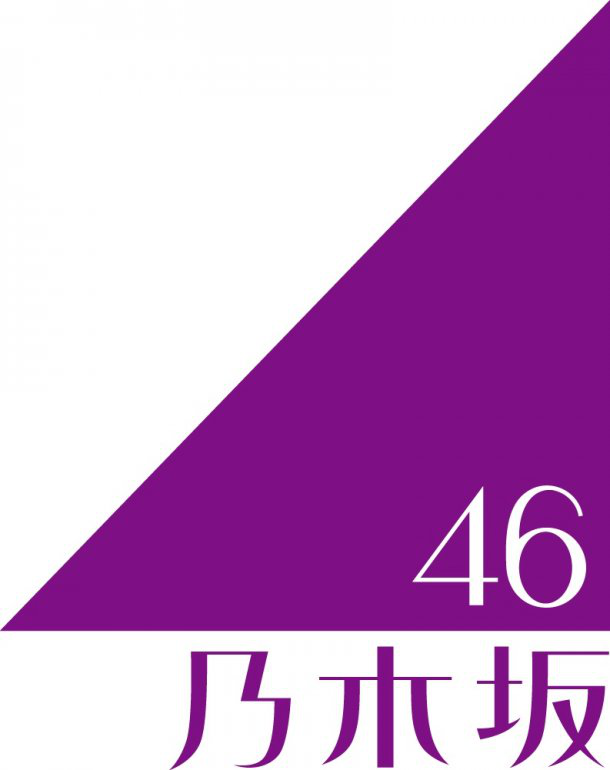
Logo of Nogizaka46

In 2011, Sony Music Entertainment Japan announced its plan to co-produce a new idol group with AKB48 producer Yasushi Akimoto after AKB48, which was signed to Sony's Defstar Records label from 2006 to 2008, became a hit and was considered a "missed opportunity" by Sony. The formation of Nogizaka46 was first announced on June 29, when it became the first group to be labelled as the "official rival" to the group AKB48, rather than a sister group like NMB48 or SKE48. The group was named after the location of the Sony Music Japan offices near Nogizaka Station. Producer Yasushi Akimoto said that the number "46" was chosen as a direct challenge to AKB48, implying that Nogizaka46 would succeed with fewer members. In contrast to AKB48 and its sister groups, the image of Nogizaka46 is based on the Japanese people's perception of conservatively-dressed private all-girls high school students in France, which carries the connotations of elegance and refinement.

Overall, 38,934 people applied to join Nogizaka46. Final auditions for the group were held from August 20–21, 2011, with 56 finalists competing for 36 available places, and 16 of them were selected as "senbatsu" ("selection") members for performances and media appearances. Many of the founding members have prior experience in the entertainment industry.

On October 2, 2011, the group launched its first television variety show, titled Nogizakatte, Doko? (乃木坂って、どこ?, Lit: Where is Nogizaka?) and hosted by the comedy duo Bananaman.

On February 22, 2012, Nogizaka46 released their debut single "Guruguru Curtain". It ranked second on the Oricon chart and sold 136,309 copies in the first week. Their second single, "Oide Shampoo", was released on May 2 of the same year, and became their first number one song on the Oricon weekly chart, with sales of 156,000 copies. The choreography for "Oide Shampoo" caused a brief controversy, as critics disapproved of the members lifting their skirts over their faces during one part of the performance.

In June 2012, Nogizaka46 took part in Yubi Matsuri, an idol festival produced by Rino Sashihara, performing before 8,000 people at Nippon Budokan. They debuted their first musical theater production, titled 16 nin no Principal, at Shibuya Parco Theater in September 2012. By the end of 2012, Nogizaka46 reached number one on the Oricon yearly chart in the newcomers sales category, with annual sales of ¥870 million.

=== 2013–2015: Second generation and national exposure ===
Nogizaka46 held their first anniversary concert at Makuhari Messe in Chiba in February 2013, performing for 9,000 fans. From December 2012 to April 2013, an audition for the second generation of Nogizaka46 members was held, with 14 new members chosen out of 16,302 applicants. Thirteen of these new members were introduced at the musical theater performance of 16 nin no Principal deux, the sequel to the 2012 musical, in May 2013. The group also launched their first radio program, titled Nogizaka46no, No (乃木坂46の「の」, Lit: Nogizaka46's No), and released their first photobook, titled Nogizaka Ha. The photobook, released in October, ranked fourth on the Oricon weekly book ranking with 27,000 copies sold.

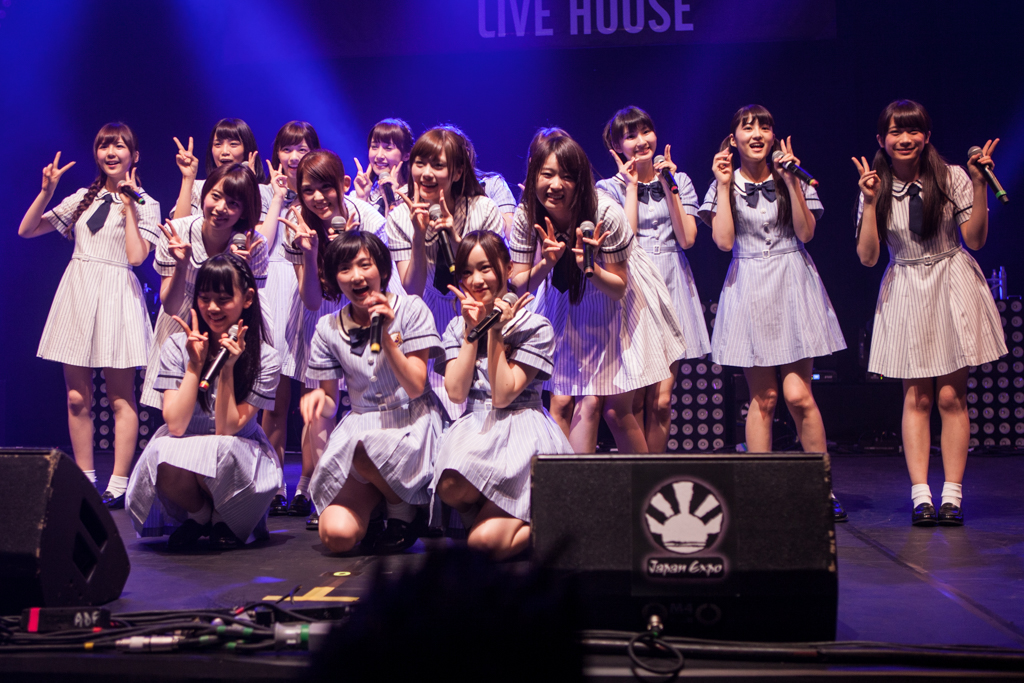
Nogizaka46 performing at the Japan Expo in Paris in 2014

In February 2014, Nogizaka46 held their second birthday concert for 13,000 fans at Yokohama Arena. During the show, the group announced that their musical 16 nin no Principal trois would open at Akasaka ACT Theater on May 30 and run until June 15. The group also released the DVD and Blu-ray versions of their first birthday concert, which reached number one on the Oricon weekly DVD chart, selling 12,000 copies in the first week. On February 24, 2014, at an AKB48 group event, it was announced that Rina Ikoma would join AKB48's Team B, and that Rena Matsui from SKE48's Team E would hold a concurrent position with Nogizaka46. On July 5, 2014, the group performed overseas for the first time, as part of a slate of Japanese performers at the Japan Expo 2014 in Paris.

On January 7, 2015, Nogizaka46 released their first album Tōmei na Iro, selling over 220,000 copies in the first week. The album reached number one on the Oricon weekly albums chart. The following month, the group held their third birthday concert, this time in front of 38,000 people at Seibu Dome in Saitama. Rina Ikoma returned to Nogizaka46, with Rena Matsui returning to SKE48. The group also launched a new television variety show, Nogizaka Kōjichū (乃木坂工事中, Lit: Nogizaka Under Construction), to replace Nogizakatte, Doko? Their first television drama, Hatsumori Bemars, premiered on the TX network in July. Nogizaka46 concluded the year by appearing for the first time on the NHK nationally broadcast New Year program Kōhaku Uta Gassen, where they performed their fifth single, titled "Kimi no Na wa Kibō".

=== 2016–2017: Third generation and Japan Record Award ===
From February 20 through February 22, 2016, Nogizaka46 broadcast an Internet TV program titled Nogizaka46 4th Anniversary Nogizaka 46 hours TV, in which the members produced and performed their own material for forty-six consecutive hours, on six websites simultaneously. In the week following the performance, the group's twelfth single "Taiyō Nokku" was selected for the 30th Japan Gold Disc Award. On May 25, 2016, they released their second album Sorezore no Isu, which reached number one on the Oricon weekly albums chart. The group promoted the second album with a second broadcast of Nogizaka 46 hours TV. On August 5, they released their second photobook, titled 1 Jikan Okure no I Love You, which sold 41,000 copies in the first week and ranked 1st on Oricon weekly book ranking.

From July 19 to September 4, 2016, the 3rd generation audition took place, with 13 finalists chosen out of 48,986 applicants. The final stage of the audition involved an appeal by 13 finalists to internet audiences using the Showroom streaming service. Twelve candidates passed the final screening.

The group's fourth birthday concert was held during the last three days of their summer tour, instead of earlier in the year, due to booking issues caused by 2020 Summer Olympics construction. In November 2016, Nogizaka46 released the 16th single "Sayonara no Imi". It reached number one on the Oricon weekly single chart, selling 827,717 copies in the first week. "Sayonara no Imi" became the group's first Million single certified by RIAJ. Nogizaka46 ended the year with their second appearance on NHK Kōhaku Uta Gassen.

In February 2017, Nogizaka46 performed their fifth annual birthday concert over 3 days at Saitama Super Arena. The first day of the concert was the final performance of group member Nanami Hashimoto, who retired from the entertainment industry. In May 2017, the group debuted a new theater production based on the manga series Asahinagu, performing in Tokyo, Osaka, and Aichi. That same month they released their third album, titled Umarete Kara Hajimete Mita Yume. Nogizaka46's first feature film, a live-action adaptation of the manga Asahinagu starring Nanase Nishino in the lead role, opened in cinemas across Japan in September 2017. The theme song for the movie, "Itsuka Dekiru kara Kyō Dekiru", was released as their 19th single.

The group's 2017 national tour held performances in Tokyo, Sendai, Osaka, Nagoya, and Niigata, and concluded on November 7 and 8 at Tokyo Dome, where they drew in over 55,000 fans each day. Three weeks later they performed overseas for the second time, with a selection of group members performing live at C3AFA Singapore. The group ended the year by winning the grand prize at the 59th Japan Record Awards for their seventeenth single, titled "Influencer", and by making their third consecutive appearance on NHK's Kōhaku Uta Gassen.

=== 2018–2021: Departures, fourth generation, and overseas expansion ===
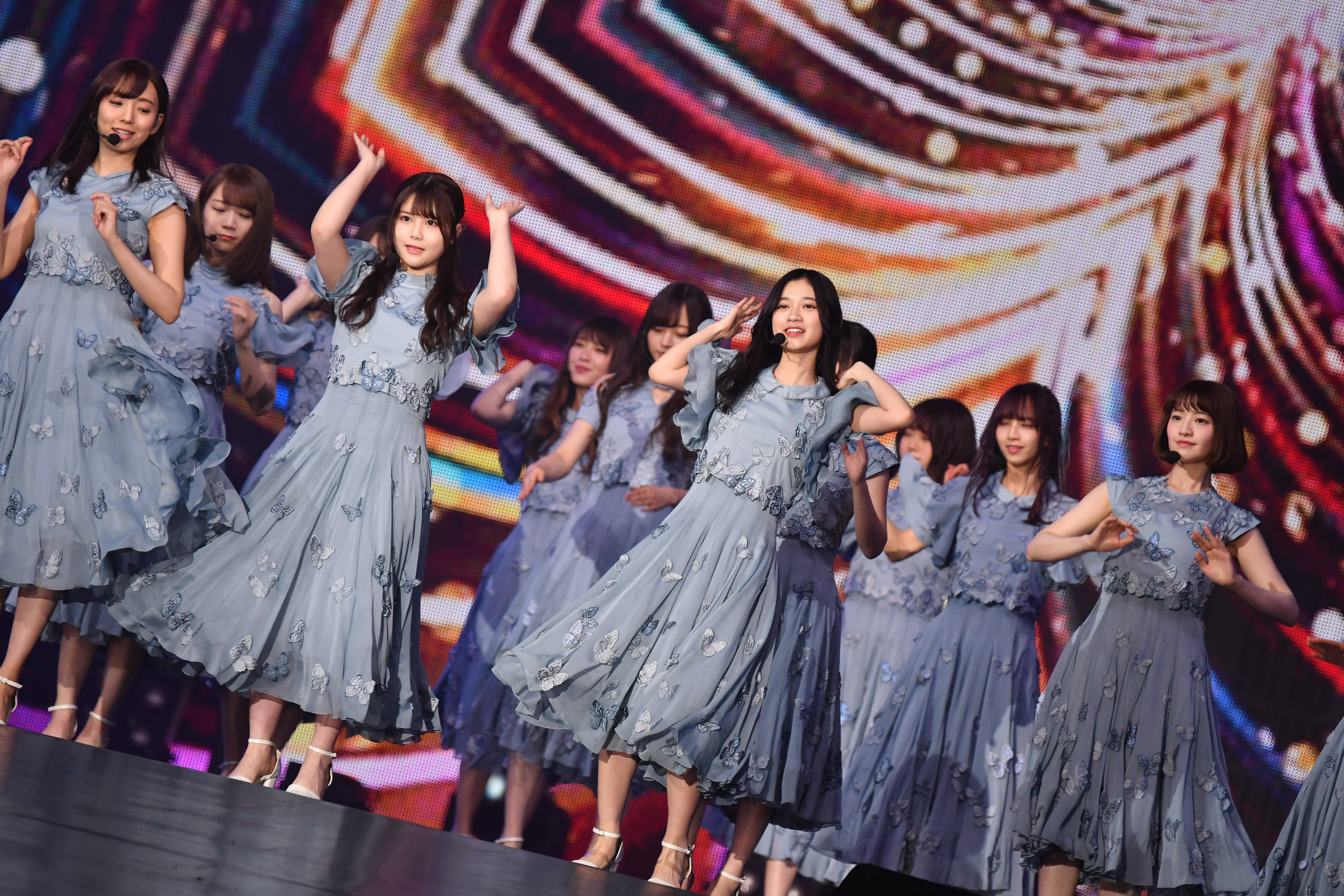
Nogizaka46 performing at the 14th KKBox Music Awards in Taiwan, 2019

From July 6 to September 2, 2018, the group held a national tour, starting with their birthday concert from July 6 to 8. On December 1, the group held their first standalone overseas concert at the Mercedes-Benz Arena in Shanghai. At the 60th Japan Record Awards, Nogizaka46 won the main Japan Record Award for their 20th single "Synchronicity", marking their second consecutive Japan Record Award win. In January 2019, Nogizaka46 visited Taiwan, where they performed at the KKBox Music Awards and held a concert at Taipei Arena. The group returned to Shanghai in October 2019, and returned to Taipei in January 2020.

A series of first generation member graduations started in 2018, when Rina Ikoma, who had centered six of the group's singles, graduated from the group in April. The final day of the 7th Birthday Live in February 2019 was a graduation concert for first generation member Nanase Nishino, who had centered or co-centered seven singles. In March 2019, Misa Etō held a solo concert as her final public appearance with the group. Nogizaka46's first captain, Reika Sakurai, graduated from the group on the final day of the 2019 national summer tour, and was succeeded as captain by Manatsu Akimoto.

On January 7, 2020, Mai Shiraishi announced her plans to leave the group after the release of its twenty-fifth single. On April 28, via her official blog, Mai Shiraishi announced that, due to the COVID-19 pandemic, her graduation would be delayed until it is safe to hold a graduation concert.

In the summer of 2018, a joint audition was held with Keyakizaka46 and Hinatazaka46. After the auditions, 39 members were accepted with 11 being assigned to Nogizaka46, forming the group's fourth generation. On February 16, 2020, five Sakamichi Series trainees were assigned to Nogizaka46 as fourth generation members.

On July 19, 2021, the group announced an audition for the group's fifth generation with applications starting that day and screening taking place on August 10. The new generation of members were planned to be unveiled in December 2021. To celebrate the 10th anniversary of the group, Nogizaka46 released the greatest hits album on December 15, 2021, titled Time Flies.

=== 2022–2024: Fifth generation and tenth anniversary ===
From February 2 to February 9, Nogizaka46 unveiled eight of the eleven new fifth generation members, with the remaining three to be unveiled in March due to academic reason. The group held their bi-annual 46-hour live on February 21–23 to commemorate their tenth anniversary. Their twenty-ninth single "Actually..." was released on March 23, with fifth generation member Aruno Nakanishi serving as the center (lead performer). However, due to having her past indiscretions exposed after the single's announcement, Nakanishi was put on hiatus as of March 3 and the center position was jointly taken over by Asuka Saitō and Mizuki Yamashita. Two of the three remaining fifth generation members were revealed on March 19 and April 1, while the last one, Hina Okamoto, was also put on hiatus for a contract breach. Both Nakanishi and Okamoto returned from their hiatus in mid-April.

The group held their 10th Year Birthday Live at Nissan Stadium on May 14–15, 2022. During the 11th Year Birthday Live held at Yokohama Arena on February 22, 2023, it was announced that vice-captain Minami Umezawa would succeed Manatsu Akimoto as captain of the group, as Akimoto would leave the group on February 26 of that year.

During Nogizaka46's "Thanksgiving Festival" held on December 14, 2024, Umezawa announced that she officially appoints fifth-generation member Satsuki Sugawara as the group's new Vice Captain.

=== 2025–present: Sixth generation and fourteenth anniversary ===
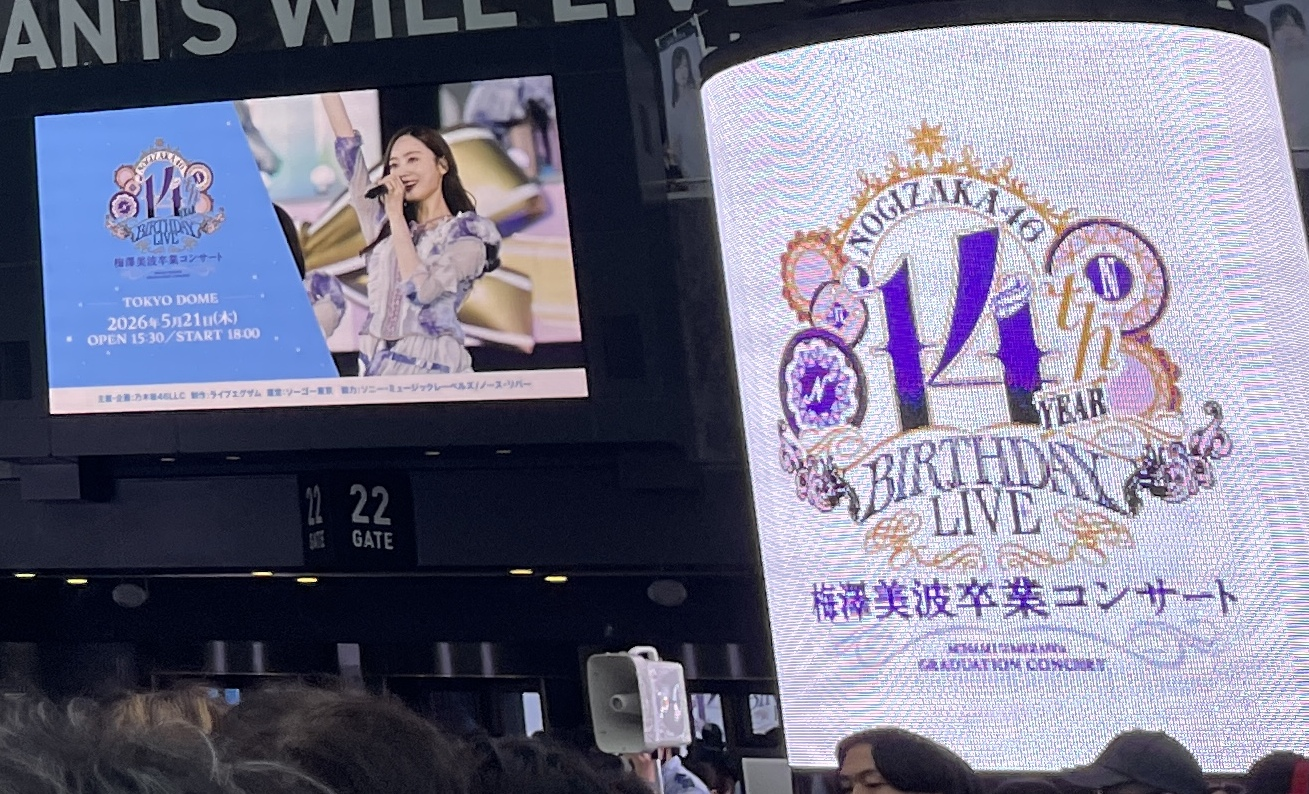
Nogizaka46's 14th Year Birthday Live and Umezawa's graduation held in Tokyo Dome in May 2026

The 14th Year Birthday Live was held at Tokyo Dome on May 19 to 21, 2026, with the final day as Minami Umezawa's graduation concert. It was announced on May 20, 2026, during the 14th Year Birthday Live that Vice Captain Satsuki Sugawara would succeed as the fourth Captain after Minami Umezawa's graduation from the group.

== Members ==
=== Current members ===
Name	Birth date (age)	Native	Generation	Other activities	Notes
Riria Itō (伊藤理々杏)	October 8, 2002 (age 24)	Okinawa	3	Actress	Announced graduation on October 17, 2026
Renka Iwamoto (岩本蓮加)	February 2, 2004 (age 22)	Tokyo	3	gravure idol, actress	
Sakura Endō (遠藤さくら)	October 3, 2001 (age 25)	Aichi	4	fashion model, actress	
Haruka Kaki (賀喜遥香)	August 8, 2001 (age 25)	Tochigi	4	radio personality, actress	
Saya Kanagawa (金川紗耶)	October 31, 2001 (age 25)	Hokkaido	4	gravure idol, fashion model, radio personality	
Haruka Kuromi (黒見明香)	January 19, 2004 (age 22)	Tokyo	New 4		
Yuna Shibata (柴田柚菜)	March 3, 2003 (age 23)	Chiba	4	radio personality	
Mayu Tamura (田村真佑)	January 12, 1999 (age 27)	Saitama	4	voice actor, radio personality	
Ayame Tsutsui (筒井あやめ)	June 8, 2004 (age 22)	Aichi	4	fashion model, actress	
Runa Hayashi (林瑠奈)	October 2, 2003 (age 23)	Kanagawa	New 4		
Nao Yumiki (弓木奈於)	February 3, 1999 (age 27)	Kyoto	New 4	actress, radio personality	
Miku Ichinose (一ノ瀬 美空)	May 24, 2003 (age 23)	Fukuoka	5	radio personality, actress	
Teresa Ikeda (池田 瑛紗)	May 12, 2002 (age 24)	Tokyo	5	radio personality	
Nagi Inoue (井上和)	February 17, 2005 (age 21)	Kanagawa	5	fashion model, radio personality, actress	
Mao Ioki (五百城 茉央)	July 29, 2005 (age 21)	Hyōgo	5	radio personality, actress	
Sakura Kawasaki (川﨑 桜)	April 17, 2003 (age 23)	Kanagawa	5	radio personality	
Aya Ogawa (小川 彩)	June 27, 2007 (age 19)	Chiba	5	radio personality, actress	
Hina Okamoto (岡本 姬奈)	December 17, 2003 (age 22)	Aichi	5	radio personality, actress	
Iroha Okuda (奥田 いろは)	August 20, 2005 (age 21)	Chiba	5	actress, tarento	
Satsuki Sugawara (菅原 咲月)	October 31, 2005 (age 21)	Chiba	5	radio personality, actress	The fourth Captain, announced during the 14th Year Birthday Live on May 20, 2026.
Nao Tomisato (冨里 奈央)	September 18, 2006 (age 20)	Chiba	5	actress	
Aruno Nakanishi (中西 アルノ)	March 17, 2003 (age 23)	Chiba	5	tarento, actress	
Kokone Atago (愛宕 心響)	September 17, 2005 (age 21)	Hyōgo	6	radio personality	
Akari Kaibe (海邉 朱莉)	February 14, 2007 (age 19)	Hyōgo	6		
Hinano Ōkoshi (大越 ひなの)	December 1, 2004 (age 21)	Shizuoka	6		
Reina Ozu (小津 玲奈)	April 17, 2007 (age 19)	Tokyo	6		
Hina Kawabata (川端 晃菜)	January 14, 2011 (age 15)	Tokyo	6		Youngest
Yuuna Suzuki (鈴木 佑捺)	May 18, 2006 (age 20)	Yamanashi	6	radio personality	
Mitsuki Setoguchi (瀬戸口 心月)	July 16, 2005 (age 21)	Kagoshima	6		
Rio Nagashima (長嶋 凛桜)	May 25, 2007 (age 19)	Hokkaido	6	radio personality	
Mirine Masuda (増田 三莉音)	November 1, 2009 (age 17)	Osaka	6	fashion model	
Urumi Morihira (森平 麗心)	October 5, 2008 (age 18)	Tokyo	6		
Moeka Yada (矢田 萌華)	January 27, 2008 (age 18)	Akita	6	radio personality	

Notes: New 4 refers to members added after the 4th generation's debut in late 2018. These members initially debuted as Kenshusei members who were then promoted to Nogizaka46 in February 2020.

=== Graduated members ===
Name	Birth date (age)	Native	Generation	Leaving date	Occupations	Notes
Honoka Yamamoto (山本穂乃香)	March 31, 1998 (age 28)	Aichi	1	September 22, 2011		
Ayaka Yoshimoto (吉本彩華)	August 18, 1996 (age 30)	Kumamoto	1	September 22, 2011		
Yumiko Iwase (岩瀬佑美子)	June 12, 1990 (age 36)	Saitama	1	November 18, 2012		Oldest founding member
Mikumo Andō (安藤美雲)	May 21, 1993 (age 33)	Kanagawa	1	June 16, 2013		
Yukina Kashiwa (柏幸奈)	August 12, 1994 (age 32)	Nagasaki	1	November 17, 2013		
Seira Miyazawa (宮澤成良)	October 29, 1993 (age 33)	Chiba	1	November 17, 2013		
Nanami Nishikawa (西川七海)	July 3, 1993 (age 33)	Tokyo	2	March 22, 2014		First second generation member to graduate
Rena Ichiki (市來玲奈)	January 22, 1996 (age 30)	Chiba	1	July 21, 2014	announcer	
Risako Yada (矢田里沙子)	March 8, 1995 (age 31)	Saitama	2	October 18, 2014		
Kyouka Yonetoku (米徳京花)	April 14, 1999 (age 27)	Kanagawa	2	October 18, 2014		
Nene Itō (伊藤寧々)	December 12, 1995 (age 30)	Gifu	1	October 19, 2014		
Rina Yamato (大和里菜)	December 14, 1994 (age 31)	Miyagi	1	December 15, 2014		
Seira Hatanaka (畠中清羅)	December 5, 1995 (age 30)	Osaka	1	April 4, 2015		
Rena Matsui (松井玲奈)	July 27, 1991 (age 35)	Aichi	SKE48 exchange	May 14, 2015	actor, novelist, YouTuber	Terminated concurrent position with Nogizaka46
Seira Nagashima (永島聖羅)	May 19, 1994 (age 32)	Aichi	1	March 20, 2016	tarento, actress	Held graduation concert at Nagoya Congress Center Century Hall on March 19–20, 2016
Mai Fukagawa (深川麻衣)	March 29, 1991 (age 35)	Shizuoka	1	June 16, 2016	actress	Held graduation concert at Ecopa Arena on June 15–16, 2016
Nanami Hashimoto (橋本奈々未)	February 20, 1993 (age 33)	Hokkaido	1	February 20, 2017		Retired from the entertainment industry after graduation; currently the employee of Sony Music Entertainment
Himeka Nakamoto (中元日芽香)	April 13, 1996 (age 30)	Hiroshima	1	November 19, 2017	mental health counselor	
Marika Itō (伊藤万理華)	February 20, 1996 (age 30)	Kanagawa	1	December 23, 2017	actress, illustrator	
Mahiro Kawamura (川村真洋)	July 23, 1995 (age 31)	Osaka	1	March 31, 2018	singer	
Rina Ikoma (生駒里奈)	December 29, 1995 (age 30)	Akita	1	May 6, 2018	tarento, actress, YouTuber	Held graduation concert at Nippon Budokan on April 22, 2018
Chiharu Saitō (斎藤ちはる)	February 17, 1997 (age 29)	Saitama	1	July 16, 2018	announcer	
Iori Sagara (相楽伊織)	November 26, 1997 (age 28)	Saitama	2	July 16, 2018	gravure model, tarento, YouTuber	
Yumi Wakatsuki (若月佑美)	June 27, 1994 (age 32)	Shizuoka	1	November 30, 2018	actress, illustrator	Held graduation ceremony at Nippon Budokan on December 4, 2018
Ami Nōjō (能條愛未)	October 18, 1994 (age 32)	Kanagawa	1	December 15, 2018	actress	
Hina Kawago (川後陽菜)	March 22, 1998 (age 28)	Nagasaki	1	December 20, 2018	model, record producer, YouTuber	
Nanase Nishino (西野七瀬)	May 25, 1994 (age 32)	Osaka	1	December 31, 2018	tarento, presenter, actress, fashion model	Held graduation concert at Kyocera Dome Osaka on February 24, 2019
Misa Etō (衛藤美彩)	January 4, 1993 (age 33)	Ōita	1	March 31, 2019	gravure model	Held graduation solo concert at Ryōgoku Kokugikan on March 19, 2019
Karin Itō (伊藤かりん)	May 26, 1993 (age 33)	Kanagawa	2	May 24, 2019	tarento, YouTuber	
Yūri Saitō (斉藤優里)	July 20, 1993 (age 33)	Tokyo	1	June 30, 2019		
Reika Sakurai (桜井玲香)	May 16, 1994 (age 32)	Kanagawa	1	September 1, 2019	actress, fashion model	The first captain. Held graduation ceremony at Meiji Jingu Stadium on September 1, 2019.
Kotoko Sasaki (佐々木琴子)	August 28, 1998 (age 28)	Saitama	2	March 31, 2020	voice actor, singer	
Sayuri Inoue (井上小百合)	December 14, 1994 (age 31)	Saitama	1	April 27, 2020	actress	
Kana Nakada (中田花奈)	August 6, 1994 (age 32)	Saitama	1	October 25, 2020	mahjong player, business manager, gravure model	
Mai Shiraishi (白石麻衣)	August 20, 1992 (age 34)	Gunma	1	October 28, 2020	tarento, model, YouTuber	Held graduation concert on October 28, 2020
Miona Hori (堀未央奈)	October 15, 1996 (age 30)	Gifu	2	March 28, 2021	tarento, fashion model, YouTuber	
Sayuri Matsumura (松村沙友理)	August 27, 1992 (age 34)	Osaka	1	July 13, 2021	tarento, fashion model, actress, YouTuber	Held graduation concert at Yokohama Arena on June 22–23, 2021
Junna Itō (伊藤純奈)	November 30, 1998 (age 27)	Kanagawa	2	August 31, 2021	stage actress	
Miria Watanabe (渡辺みり愛)	November 1, 1999 (age 27)	Tokyo	2	August 31, 2021	stage actress, YouTuber	
Momoko Ōzono (大園桃子)	September 13, 1999 (age 27)	Kagoshima	3	September 4, 2021	businessperson, YouTuber	Retired from the entertainment industry after graduation; currently the owner of the fashion brand Philme. First third generation member to graduate
Kazumi Takayama (高山一実)	February 8, 1994 (age 32)	Chiba	1	November 21, 2021	tarento, presenter, novelist	Held graduation ceremony at Tokyo Dome on November 21, 2021
Ranze Terada (寺田蘭世)	September 23, 1998 (age 28)	Tokyo	2	December 12, 2021	business manager	Held graduation ceremony at Tachikawa Stage Garden on October 28, 2021; retired from the entertainment industry after graduation
Erika Ikuta (生田絵梨花)	January 22, 1997 (age 29)	Tokyo	1	December 31, 2021	actress, tarento, singer	Held graduation concert at Yokohama Arena on December 14–15, 2021
Mai Shinuchi (新内眞衣)	January 22, 1992 (age 34)	Saitama	2	February 10, 2022	actress, tarento, fashion model, radio personality	Held graduation ceremony at Tokyo International Forum Hall A on February 10, 2022
Minami Hoshino (星野みなみ)	February 6, 1998 (age 28)	Chiba	1	February 12, 2022		Held graduation ceremony at Tokyo International Forum Hall A on February 12, 2022; retired from the entertainment industry after graduation
Hinako Kitano (北野日奈子)	July 17, 1996 (age 30)	Chiba	2	April 30, 2022	tarento, fashion model, YouTuber	Held graduation concert at Pia Arena MM on March 24, 2022
Rena Yamazaki (山崎怜奈)	May 21, 1997 (age 29)	Tokyo	2	July 17, 2022	tarento, radio personality, writer	
Hina Higuchi (樋口日奈)	January 31, 1998 (age 28)	Tokyo	1	October 31, 2022	actress, fashion model	Held graduation ceremony at Tokyo International Forum Hall A on October 31, 2022
Maaya Wada (和田まあや)	April 23, 1998 (age 28)	Hiroshima	1	December 4, 2022	tarento, businessperson	
Asuka Saitō (齋藤飛鳥)	August 10, 1998 (age 28)	Tokyo	1	December 31, 2022	tarento, presenter, fashion model	Held graduation concert at Tokyo Dome on May 17–18, 2023
Manatsu Akimoto (秋元真夏)	August 20, 1993 (age 33)	Saitama	1	February 26, 2023	actress	The second captain. Held graduation concert at Yokohama Arena on February 26, 2023. Last first generation member to graduate
Ayane Suzuki (鈴木絢音)	March 5, 1999 (age 27)	Akita	2	March 28, 2023	tarento, writer	Held graduation ceremony at Line Cube Shibuya on March 28, 2023. Last second generation member to graduate
Yuri Kitagawa (北川悠理)	August 8, 2001 (age 25)	California	4	June 30, 2023	actress	First fourth generation member to graduate
Seira Hayakawa (早川聖来)	August 24, 2000 (age 26)	Osaka	4	August 24, 2023		Held graduation ceremony at Osaka-jō Hall on July 13, 2024; retired from the entertainment industry after graduation
Mizuki Yamashita (山下美月)	July 26, 1999 (age 27)	Tokyo	3	May 12, 2024	actress, fashion model	Held graduation concert at Tokyo Dome on May 11–12, 2024
Tamami Sakaguchi (阪口珠美)	November 10, 2001 (age 25)	Tokyo	3	July 15, 2024	tarento, radio personality	Held graduation ceremony on July 15, 2024
Rei Seimiya (清宮レイ)	August 1, 2003 (age 23)	Saitama	4	July 17, 2024	actress, tarento	Held graduation ceremony on July 17, 2024
Sayaka Kakehashi (掛橋沙耶香)	November 20, 2002 (age 23)	Okayama	4	August 19, 2024		Held graduation ceremony on August 19, 2024; retired from the entertainment industry after graduation
Hazuki Mukai (向井葉月)	August 23, 1999 (age 27)	Tokyo	3	December 31, 2024		Held graduation ceremony at Makuhari Messe Event Hall on December 15, 2024; retired from the entertainment industry after graduation
Yūki Yoda (与田祐希)	May 5, 2000 (age 26)	Fukuoka	3	February 23, 2025	tarento, actress, fashion model	Held graduation concert at Mizuho PayPay Dome Fukuoka on February 22–23, 2025
Kaede Satō (佐藤楓)	March 23, 1998 (age 28)	Aichi	3	May 6, 2025	model	Held graduation ceremony at Pia Arena MM on April 5, 2025.
Reno Nakamura (中村麗乃)	September 27, 2001 (age 25)	Tokyo	3	June 26, 2025	actress, tarento	Held graduation solo ceremony at Huric Hall Tokyo on June 26, 2025.
Shiori Kubo (久保史緒里)	July 14, 2001 (age 25)	Miyagi	3	November 27, 2025	tarento, actress, radio personality	Held graduation concert at Yokohama Arena on November 26–27, 2025.
Miyu Matsuo (松尾美佑)	January 3, 2004 (age 22)	Chiba	New 4	December 31, 2025		Held graduation ceremony at Nippon Budokan on December 19, 2025; retired from the entertainment industry after graduation
Mio Yakubo (矢久保美緒)	August 14, 2002 (age 24)	Tokyo	4	December 31, 2025	tarento	Held graduation ceremony at Nippon Budokan on December 20, 2025.
Rika Satō (佐藤璃果)	August 9, 2001 (age 25)	Iwate	New 4	May 2, 2026		Held graduation ceremony at Pia Arena MM on March 19, 2026.
Minami Umezawa (梅澤美波)	January 6, 1999 (age 27)	Kanagawa	3	May 21, 2026	fashion model, actress, tarento	The third captain. Held graduation concert at Tokyo Dome on May 21, 2026.
Ayano-Christie Yoshida (吉田綾乃クリスティー)	September 6, 1995 (age 31)	Ōita	3	Aug 9, 2026	actress	graduation ceremony scheduled on Aug 9, 2026.

== Discography ==
- Tōmei na Iro (2015)
- Sorezore no Isu (2016)
- Umarete kara Hajimete Mita Yume (2017)
- Ima ga Omoide ni Naru made (2019)
- My Respect (2026)

== Tours and concerts ==
Since their first "Birthday Live" concert in 2013, Nogizaka46 has held annual concerts during which the group performs all or most of the songs in their catalogue. At the first Birthday Live concert at Makuhari Messe, the group performed all of the songs from their first four singles to an audience of 9,000 people. In 2014 they performed for 13,000 fans at Yokohama Arena, and the following year they performed 69 songs in a seven-and-a-half hour birthday concert for 38,000 fans at Seibu Dome. The group's growing catalogue and fan base led to longer concerts at larger venues, including three-day concerts at Meiji Jingu Stadium in 2016 and Saitama Super Arena in 2017, and a four-day Birthday Live concert in 2019 at Kyocera Dome, at which the group performed all 177 songs in their catalogue.

Nogizaka46 has also held a national summer concert tour each year at venues across Japan, concluding with a show in Tokyo. In 2013, the tour included ten performances in five cities, with a final three-hour concert at Yoyogi National Gymnasium. Four years later, the national tour concluded with a two-day performance for 100,000 fans at Tokyo Dome. In addition to the regular summer concert tour, the group has occasionally held concerts to commemorate holidays such as Christmas, or to highlight members of the group who have not been chosen to perform on the main singles.

== Filmography ==
=== Documentary film ===
- Kanashimi no Wasurekata : Documentary of Nogizaka46 (2015)
- Itsu no Ma ni ka, Koko ni Iru: Documentary of Nogizaka46 (2019)

=== Live-action films ===
- Asahinagu (2017)
- Eizouken ni wa Te o Dasu na! (2020)

=== Television ===
- NogiBingo! (NTV, 2013–2018)
- Saba Doru (TV Tokyo, 2012)
- Nogizaka Roman (TV Tokyo, 2012)
- Nogizaka Under Construction (TV Tokyo, 2015–)
- Nogizakatte, Doko? (TV Tokyo, 2011–2015)
- Hatsumori Bemars (TV Tokyo, 2015)
- Nogizaka46 Eigo (TBS, 2015–2021)
- Sagara to Kiyoto no Nogizaka Pupupu (TVS, 2015)
- Watashi no Hatarakikata 〜Nogizaka46 no Double Work Taiken!〜 (Fuji TV, 2018–2019)
- Zambi (2019)
- Nogizaka 46 no The Dream Baito! 〜Hatarakikata Kaikaku! Yume e no Chōsen!〜 (Fuji TV, 2019–)
- Nogizaka Doko e (NTV, 2019–2020)
- Samu no Koto (DTV, 2020)
- Saru ni au (DTV, 2020)
- Nogizaka Skits (NTV, 2020–2021)
- Nogizaka Star Tanjou (NTV, 2021–2022)
- Shin Nogizaka Star Tanjou (NTV, 2022–)
- Nogizaka46 Yamazaki Rena to Ohatsu-chan (dTV, 2020–2021)
- Everyone's Best Kouhaku 100th Anniversary of Broadcasting Special (NHK, 2025) (cast)

=== Theater ===
- 16 nin no Principal (Shibuya Parco Theater, 2012)
- 16 nin no Principal deux (Akasaka ACT Theater and Umeda Arts Theater, 2013)
- 16 nin no Principal trois (Akasaka ACT Theater, 2014)
- Joshiraku (AiiA 2.5 Theater Tokyo, 2015)
- Subete no Inu wa Tengoku e Iku (AiiA 2.5 Theater Tokyo, 2015)
- Joshiraku 2: Toki Kakesoba (AiiA 2.5 Theater Tokyo, 2016)
- Hakaba Joshikōsei (Tokyo Dome City Theater G-Rosso, 2016)
- 3 nin no Principal (3rd Generation members) (AiiA 2.5 Theater Tokyo, 2017)
- Asahinagu (Ex Theater Roppongi, 2017)
- 3 nin no Principal (4th Generation members) (Sunshine Theater, 2019)

== Awards ==
List of awards received by Nogizaka46
Ceremony	Year	Award	Nominated work	Result	Ref.
Japan Cable Awards	2017	Excellent Music Award	"Influencer"	Won	
Japan Gold Disc Awards	2013	New Artist of the Year	Nogizaka46	Won	
Japan Gold Disc Awards	2015	Best 5 Singles	"Nandome no Aozora ka?"	Won	
Japan Gold Disc Awards	2016	Best 5 Singles	"Taiyō Nokku"	Won	
Japan Gold Disc Awards	2017	Best 5 Singles	"Influencer"	Won	
Japan Gold Disc Awards	2018	Best 5 Singles	"Nigemizu"	Won	
Japan Gold Disc Awards	2019	Best 5 Singles	"Synchronicity"	Won	
Japan Gold Disc Awards	2019	Best 5 Singles	"Jikochū de Ikō!"	Won	
Japan Gold Disc Awards	2021	Best 5 Singles	"Shiawase no Hogoshoku"	Won	
Japan Gold Disc Awards	2022	Best 5 Singles	"Boku wa Boku o Suki ni Naru"	Won	
Japan Gold Disc Awards	2022	Best 5 Singles	"Gomen ne Fingers Crossed"	Won	
Japan Gold Disc Awards	2022	Best 5 Albums	Time Flies	Won	
Japan Gold Disc Awards	2023	Best 5 Singles	"Suki to Iu no wa Rock da ze!"	Won	
Japan Gold Disc Awards	2023	Best 5 Singles	"Koko ni wa Nai Mono"	Won	
Japan Record Awards	2017	Grand Prix	"Influencer"	Won	
Japan Record Awards	2018	Grand Prix	"Synchronicity"	Won	
Japan Record Awards	2019	Excellent Work Award	"Sing Out!"	Won	
