= Lia Ouyang Rusli =

American composer, musician, and artist

- Also known as: OHYUNG
- Origin: New York City
- Genres: Electronic music; noise; hip-hop; ambient
- Occupations: Musician; composer; artist; DJ
- Labels: Deathbomb Arc; Chinabot; NNA Tapes; Phantom Limb; Trans Music Archive
- Website: liarus.li

Lia Ouyang Rusli, also known professionally as OHYUNG, is an American composer, musician, and artist. She is known for her work as a composer on films such as Problemista (2023) and Sorry, Baby (2025). She creates electronic and ambient music as the solo project OHYUNG. Rusli released her most recent OHYUNG album, IOWA, on 6 March 2026.

== Career ==
Rusli self-released her debut OHYUNG album, (Untitled) Chinese Man with Flame, on 1 May 2018. It was later re-released in 2020 under the music label Deathbomb Arc. Her sophomore album, PROTECTOR, was released on 8 April 2020 via the music collective and platform Chinabot. For her third album, OHYUNG collaborated with drummer Matt Evans to release GODLESS in 2021 with Deathbomb Arc. Collectively, these first three albums have been noted for their intensity, political themes, and multi-genre style of hip-hop, electronic, and noise music.

OHYUNG's fourth album, imagine naked!, was released on 22 April 2022 through the label NNA Tapes. The nearly two hour-long album marked a shift from Rusli's earlier work, as it was her first completely ambient release. NPR praised imagine naked! and featured it on NPR Music's lists of 50 Best Albums and 11 Best Experimental Albums for 2022. The track "my torn cuticles!" was also named in NPR Music's list of 36 Favorite Songs of 2022 (So Far) in June of that year. The majority of the album's writing and recording was reportedly done over three days. Each track derives its title from a line in the poem "Vegetalscape" by t. tran le, which serves as an artistic accompaniment to imagine naked!.

In January 2025 Rusli announced her fifth OHYUNG album, You Are Always On My Mind. The announcement was accompanied by a release of the lead single "no good" along with a music video. The LP was released in the United States via NNA Tapes and in the United Kingdom via Phantom Limb on 28 March 2025, marked by an album release show that same day at Market Hotel in New York City. The more pop music-centered You Are Always On My Mind addresses themes such as gender identity, self-discovery, and the power of rave culture. The album has garnered positive reviews from media outlets such as Pitchfork, PopMatters, and Paste. Writing for Paste, Devon Chodzin described the work as an "unpredictable masterpiece." It was featured in the magazine's list of 50 Best Albums of 2025. Rusli began work on the album in New York City and completed it while living in Iowa City.

During Rusli's 11-month stay in Iowa, from 2023 to 2024, she also worked on her sixth OHYUNG album, IOWA. Released on 6 March 2026 via Trans Music Archive, the experimental album has received positive reviews from PopMatters, Pitchfork, and was featured on the lists 12 New Albums to Stream This Week (from March 2026) and The 50 Best Albums of 2026 So Far from Paste. It is OHYUNG's second ambient album since imagine naked! (2022). IOWA was written as an homage to the Bruce Springsteen album Nebraska (1982), including referential elements of the cover design and album title. Proceeds from IOWA benefited the Iowa Trans Mutual Aid Fund.

Rusli is a transgender woman and cites trans identity as a theme she explores on her album You Are Always On My Mind (2025), describing it as "my trans self and my former self in conversation, from both perspectives."

== Discography ==
=== Studio albums as OHYUNG ===
- (Untitled) Chinese Man with Flame (2018)
- PROTECTOR (2020)
- GODLESS (2021) – with Matt Evans
- imagine naked! (2022)
- You Are Always On My Mind (2025)
- IOWA (2026)

=== Soundtrack albums / Motion Picture Scores composed ===
- Test Pattern (2021)
- Bruiser (2023)
- Dreams in Nightmares (2024)
- Problemista (2024)
- Happyend (2024)
- Sorry, Baby (2025)
