= Sorry, Baby (soundtrack) =

Sorry, Baby (Original Score)

Film score by Lia Ouyang Rusli
- Released: July 4, 2025
- Recorded: 2024–2025
- Genre: Film score
- Length: 21:00
- Label: A24 Music
- Producer: Lia Ouyang Rusli

Lia Ouyang Rusli chronology
You Are Always on My Mind (2025)	Sorry, Baby (2025)

Sorry, Baby (Original Score) is the film score to the 2025 film Sorry, Baby directed by Eva Victor. The film's original score is composed by Lia Ouyang Rusli and released through A24 Music on July 4, 2025.

== Development ==
Lia Ouyang Rusli composed the film score for Sorry, Baby. Victor noted that the team could not temp music which worked on providing a consistent sound, despite some tracks that felt right musically. The opening shot of the house, which Victor noted on providing horror film vibes, they did not have a score for a film, and some temp tracks they used provided a dark or flippant sounds and times. Victor then met Rusli who curated a playlist of pop songs and instrumentals which inhabited the world of the film, who noted that they completely understood the material from the inside and how it flows thereafter. Rusli began composing a version of the opening music, which led Victor to feel them as the right person who could elevate the film.

Victor noted the film's tonal shift would allow the score to make it grounded and provide consistent feel. Rusli also composed few choral bits of the score that provided a warm and playful feel. The opening theme song had six versions composed for the film. Rusli wrote the score within a duration of five to six weeks. She noted the opening theme music was perfect and hopeful as it gave a delight and warmth to a horror film-like shot, providing a magical experience.

== Reception ==
Richard Lawson of Vanity Fair called it a "lilting, occasionally whimsical score". Tim Grierson of Screen International wrote "Composer Lia Ouyang Rusli's poignant piano score accentuates the sense of Agnes as a bright but broken soul". Pete Hammond of Deadline Hollywood wrote "Lia Ouyang Rusli's lilting score comes in just as its needed". Hanna Flint of Time Out called it as a "warmly melancholic score". Peter Debruge of Variety and Jon Frosch of The Hollywood Reporter found the score to be "hopeful" and "organic". Markie Scott-Robson of The Arts Desk denoted it as an "atmospheric score from Lia Ouyang Rusli." Joe Hammerschmidt of Warm 106.9 wrote "the ambient expressiveness of composer Lia Ouyang Rusli, know their lane and never over-extending the quiet subtlety required, embracing it for all the senses to appreciate." Jacob Oller of The A.V. Club wrote "Lia Ouyang Rusli's sparsely deployed, piano-driven score offers only brief respites from the film's reality".

== Track listing ==
No.	Title	Length
1.	"The Year with the Baby"	1:48
2.	"Agnes and Lydie"	0:51
3.	"Across the Field"	1:00
4.	"Flashback"	0:36
5.	"An Empty Feeling"	1:00
6.	"To the Lighthouse"	1:13
7.	"The Year with the Bad Thing"	2:26
8.	"We Are Women"	1:00
9.	"The Next Morning"	0:50
10.	"Cover the Window"	1:01
11.	"The Year with the Good Sandwich"	0:52
12.	"Being Gay and in Love"	2:10
13.	"Gavin Will You Come F**k Me"	0:43
14.	"Bathtub"	0:46
15.	"Sorry Baby" (Piano)	2:37
16.	"Sorry Baby" (Electronic)	2:07

== Release history ==
Release history and formats for Sorry, Baby (Original Score)
Region	Date	Format(s)	Label(s)	Ref.
Various	July 4, 2025	Digital download; streaming	A24 Music	
Various	August 8, 2025	LP	A24 Music	
