= Yousuke Yukimatsu =

Japanese DJ and producer

Yosuke Yukimatsu
- 行松陽介
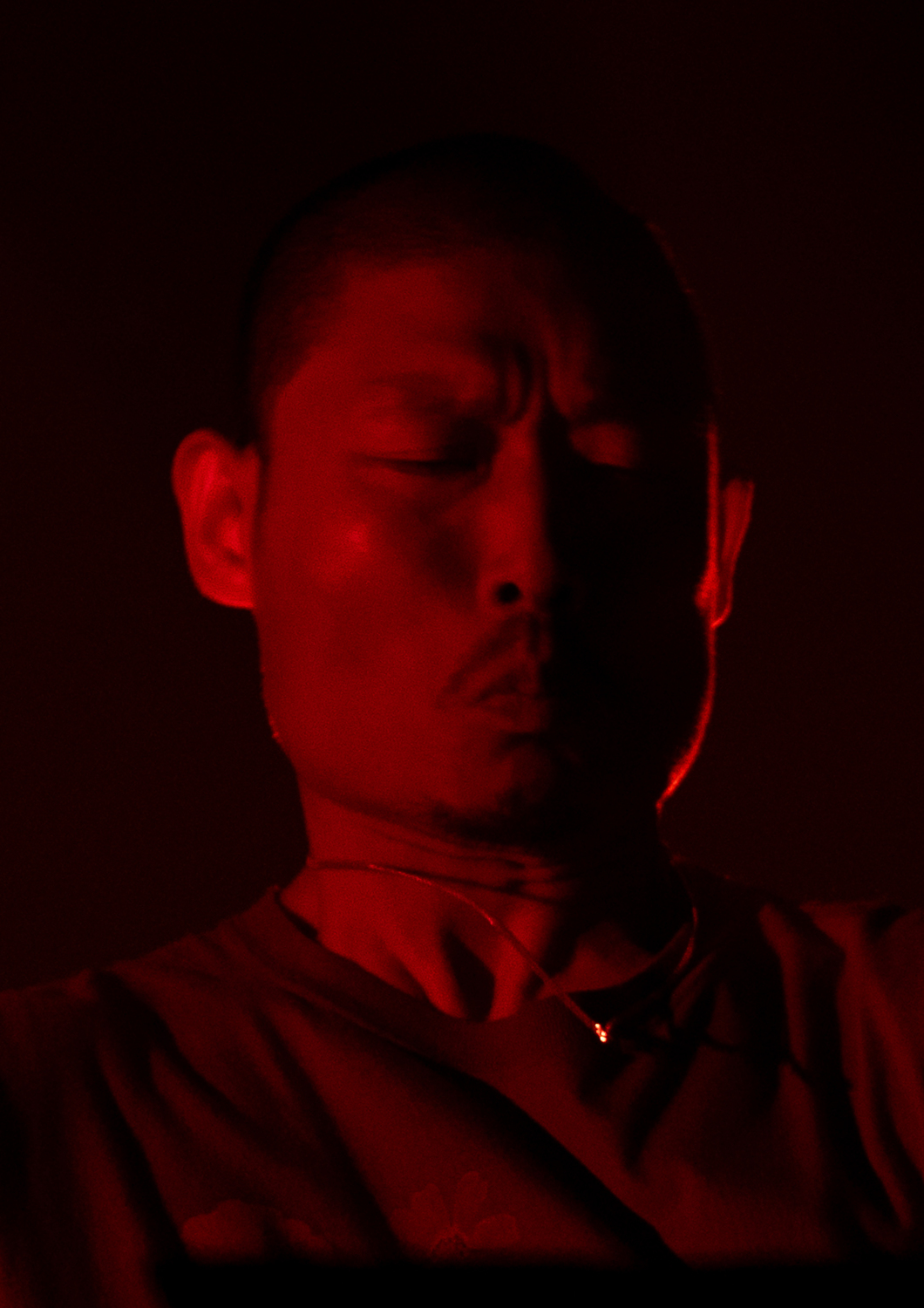
- Yousuke Yukimatsu performing at the Montreux Jazz Festival 2026.
- Born: May 15, 1979 (age 47); Jōtō-ku, Osaka
- Known for: DJ, producer

Yousuke Yukimatsu (行松陽介, Yukimatsu Yōsuke; stylised as ¥ØU$UK€ ¥UK1MAT$U) (born 15 May 1979) is a Japanese DJ and producer.

== Early life and education ==
Yukimatsu was born in Jōtō-ku, Osaka. Raised on classic rock by his Deep Purple-enthusiast father, he later described the exposure as "a very good education," despite initially feeling indifferent toward the music. During his early youth, he primarily listened to pop music, but in his teenage years, he broadened his musical interests, exploring hard rock and metal in middle school, followed by alternative rock acts such as Sonic Youth and electronic music like The Prodigy in high school. Yukimatsu began DJing in 2008, first performing at a friend's party in his hometown, and soon became a regular presence in local line-ups.

== Career ==
Yukimatsu began his career in the underground music scene during the 2010s before gaining recognition in the Japanese club circuit. He spent much of his early career performing at occasional parties in Osaka and the neighboring city of Kobe. A turning point came in 2014, when he played alongside techno artist DJ Nobu. Impressed by Yukimatsu's set, DJ Nobu invited him to perform at his Future Terror party in Tokyo, helping establish Yukimatsu’s reputation and contributing to his emergence as a prominent figure in Japan’s club scene.

Performing at events alongside artists such as Oneohtrix Point Never, Marcel Fengler, and Adam X, Yukimatsu gradually built a dedicated following among Japanese electronic music fans and international audiences. Seeking to create his own platform, he founded the Zone Unknown party series in Osaka and Kobe, hosting artists including Palmistry, Kamixlo, and Arca, the latter of whom performed live vocals during one of his sets.

Originally employed in construction, Yukimatsu was diagnosed with a malignant brain tumor in 2016, leading him to leave his job. After undergoing treatment and two surgeries, he shifted his focus entirely to DJing, further developing his experimental style.

In 2020, Yukimatsu released the mix album Midnight is Comin' under the Singapore label Midnight Shift. Nearly all of the tracks, primarily contributed by relatively obscure Japanese experimental musicians, are exclusive to the mix. To promote the album, he toured Europe, performing in cities like Malmö, Paris, London, and Berlin. Pitchfork's Philip Sherburne praised the album, calling it "one of the most immersive DJ mixes in recent memory" and highlighting its slow-burning intensity and subtle transitions.

In early 2025, he gained wider attention for his Boiler Room set in Tokyo, which quickly became one of the platform’s most-viewed videos, reaching over twelve million views on Youtube within half a year. His set featured references to artists such as Romy and Overmono, incorporating elements of acid house.

Yukimatsu is known for performing topless during his sets.

Yukimatsu has performed regularly at the Berlin Atonal festival. In 2023, he performed at Wonderfruit in Thailand. Since 2019, he has been part of Tianzhuo Chen's long durational, international performance installation TRANCE, where he also appeared as a dancer.

In 2024, Yukimatsu appeared in the movie Happyend from the American director Neo Sora, acting as a DJ in an underground party in Tokyo.

In 2026, Yukimatsu performed in the Sahara Tent at the Coachella Valley Music and Arts Festival, the Montreux Jazz Lab at the Montreux Jazz Festival, Switzerland, and in the Delta District at Sziget Fesztivál, Hungary.
