= Kilala Inori =

Japanese actress (born 2000)

- 禱 キララ
- Born: April 30, 2000 (age 26); Osaka Prefecture, Japan
- Education: Waseda University
- Occupation: Actress
- Years active: 2010–present
- Agent: Ten Carat
- Notable work: Immersion; Pachinko

Kilala Inori (禱 キララ, Inori Kirara; born March 30, 2000) is a Japanese actress. Her most notable roles to date are the supporting roles of Imajo in the horror and suspense film Immersion, and Akiko Nakazono in the Apple TV+ Korean historical drama, Pachinko.

== Biography ==
Inori was born and raised in Osaka Prefecture on March 30, 2000. After completing her high school education at Osaka Prefectural Shijonawate High School (大阪府立四條畷高等学校), she enrolled in Waseda University and graduated in 2022.

== Filmography ==
=== Film ===
Year	Title	Role	Notes	Ref.
2010	Horikawa Nakadachiuri			
2012	Dressing Up	Ikumi Sakurai	Lead role	
2012	Mariko	Mariko	Lead role; short film	
2013	Invisible Person	Aimi		
2014	Pray		Lead role; short film	
2015	Happy Hour	Yuki Misawa		
2016	Escape Escape 17	Maria		
2016	Dadadada Seventeen	Shizuka Miyazaki		
2018	If That's the Case	Aya Seto	Lead role	
2019	Eine Kleine Nachtmusik	school girl role		
2019	Goodbye		Lead role	
2019	Paradise	Aika Fujiki		
2020	Beautiful Escape	Hikari Nanao		
2020	It's a Summer Film	Blue Hawaii		
2021	Someday I'll Be Forgotten	Mari Watanabe		
2021	Ramblers 2	Seo-yeon		
2022	Yamabuki	Yamabuki Hayakawa	Lead role	
2023	Immersion	Imajo	Lead role	
2023	Talking About The Ghost			
2024	Happyend	Fumi		
2025	Koinou Experiment	Shisaku Yamada	Lead role	
2025	Transcending Dimensions	Watanabe		
2025	About Hiiragi	Sara Kida		
2026	Transit in Flamingo	Akari		
2026	All the Lovers in the Night	Nakamura		
2027	A Happy Ending for Me, a Pansy.	Suzuki Seiko		

=== Television ===
Year	Title	Role	Notes	Ref.
2011	Iryu Sosa			
2018	Tokyo Alien Bros.	Hana	Cameo	
2018–19	Sakura's Oyakodon 2	Uta Komiyama		
2020	Panda Judges the World	Yukino Maekawa		
2020–21	Memories: The Story of Nurses	Rio Harukawa		
2021	Relic Investigation	Minako Nakajima	Series 6; Episode 5	
2021	Silver Plan to Redo from JK	Maki Kashimura		
2021	Ex-Convict: New Probation Officer Agawa Kayo	Miwa		
2021	Once Again, By The Sea		Miniseries	
2022	Hunting on a Lonely Hill	Ai Hatanaka		
2022	Seikogram: When I was Reincarnated, I was a Schoolgirl During the War	Yamakawa		
2022	Solitary Gourmet	Sakiko Nakata	Cameo; Season 10, episode 11	
2022	Lapis Lazuli and Crystal Shine When Illuminated	Ruri Tateishi		
2023	Jack o' Frost	Tomoko Miyasaka		
2023	Hideyoshi Works at a Startup Company	Kanako		
2024	I am: My Unconfessable Lover	Nagisa Adachi	Web series; episode 5	
2024	The Yips	Aoi Kubo	Episodes 9–11	
2025	Noh Mask Prosecutor	Koharu Kanamori		
2025	Pachinko	Akiko Nakazono	Season 2	
2025	Beauty Salon in Prison	Shiho Ashihara		
2025	Propaganda Game	Sayaka Ochi		
2026	Something in Winter, Something in Spring		Episode 3	
2026	We are Bad Barbers	Nanami Koyama	Episode 5 and 6	
