= It's a Summer Film =

It's a Summer Film!
- Official Japanese movie poster
- サマーフィルムにのって (Japanese)
- Directed by: Sōshi Matsumoto
- Screenplay by: Sōshi Matsumoto
- Cinematography: Hiroshi Iwanaga
- Edited by: Ken'ichi Hirai
- Music by: Manato Kemmochi
- Production company: Pipeline
- Distributed by: Phantom Films
- Release dates: 24 October 2020 (Tokyo International Film Festival); 6 August 2021 (Japan)
- Running time: 97 minutes
- Country: Japan
- Language: Japanese
- Box office: Worldwide as of 2023: US$222,897

It's a Summer Film (サマーフィルムにのって, Samā Firumu ni Notte), also translated as It's a Summer Film!, is a 2021 Japanese science fiction romantic comedy written and directed by Sōshi Matsumoto. It is set in a Japanese high school during the filming of a school film called Samurai Spring.

== Plot ==
In 2020, Japanese high school student Barefoot and her friends Blue Hawaii and Kickboard decide to make a jidaigeki (an old-fashioned samurai film) called Samurai Spring, instead of the teen romance film that they are supposed to be working on with the film club. Barefoot meets a strange boy her age, who she chases while trying to persuade him to star at her feature. The boy, Rintaro, reluctantly agrees, and Barefoot assembles a team of classmates to make Samurai Spring. During a rehearsal, Rintaro accidentally reveals that he is a time travelling fan of Barefoot's future films. He says that films in the future are just a few minutes long, so he, a cinema affectionado, went back to 2020 to see the only lost entry in renowned director Barefoot's filmography: Samurai Spring.

As Barefoot's team continue with filming, the director herself is constantly rewriting the last stand-off scene between the main character and his enemy. She is upset and helpless because of Rintaro's revelation that film ceased to exist as a medium. She withdraws from him and is even more annoyed by her competitor, Karin, who is filming a sugary rom-com on a lavish budget provided by the film club. However, when a supporting actress faints on set, Barefoot's team helps Karin out by asking Blue Hawaii to play the part. Rintaro confronts Barefoot and promises to not allow films to go extinct so that she continues with her career. Meanwhile, Blue Hawaii and Kickboard learn from Rintaro's friend that they must delete the film after the showing in order to prevent a time paradox.

At the day of the screening of both the rom-com and the Samurai Spring as a double feature, Rintaro informs Barefoot that he is leaving back to the future straight after the film's ending. She stops the screening before the final scene and commands the team to play it live at the improvised cinema in the gym hall, taking the role of the main character's enemy. She fights Rintaro and confesses her love to him, then declares that the film must be destroyed because she will remake it now that she finally understands the meaning of the final fight in a samurai film.

== Cast ==
- Marika Itō as Barefoot
- Daichi Kaneko as Rintaro
- Yuumi Kawai as Kickboard
- Kilala Inori as Blue Hawaii
- Mahiru Coda as Karin
- Shun'ya Itabashi as Daddy Boy

== Release ==
It's a Summer Film! was screened in 2021 at Fantasia Fest. It was also shown at the Tokyo International Film Festival.
