= Nogizaka Skits =

Japanese television show

- Season 2 promotional poster, depicting all the cast members

Japanese name
- Kana: ノギザカスキッツ
Transcriptions
- Revised Hepburn: Nogizaka Sukittsu
- Genre: Sketch comedy
- Created by: Yasushi Akimoto
- Starring: Nogizaka46; Saraba Seishun no Hikari (Tetsuya Morita and Higashi Bukuro)
- Narrated by: Jimbo Bonji
- Opening theme: "I see..." by Nogizaka46
- Country of origin: Japan
- Original language: Japanese
- No. of episodes: 40

Production
- Producer: Shinobu Mōri
- Camera setup: Multi-camera
- Running time: 24 minutes
- Production company: Nippon TV

Original release
- Network: Nippon TV
- Release: June 16, 2020 – April 6, 2021

Related
- Nogizaka, Doko e (2019–2020); Nogizaka Star Tanjō! (2021–2022)

Nogizaka Skits (Japanese: ノギザカスキッツ) is a sketch comedy television show, starring members of the girl group Nogizaka46 and comedy duo Saraba Seishun no Hikari. It ran for two seasons on Nippon TV from 2020 to 2021, and a live comedy and concert show was held on live streaming as the final installment. The first season exclusively features Nogizaka46 members from the fourth generation, while the second season features the third generation as well.

== The skits ==
This is a non-exhaustive list of the skits performed in the show.

Title	Main character(s)	Portrayed by	Description
"Ayame-chan's Gonna Arrest You!" (あやめちゃんが逮捕ちかうぞ！)	Ayame Tsutsui	Ayame Tsutsui	An idol becomes an honorary police chief for a day for publicity purposes, but is able to utilize her idol experience to do real police work
"The Beautiful Rayland-sama" (麗しのレイランド様, Uruwashi no Rayland-sama)	Rayland	Rei Seimiya	A parody of famous host Roland who does humble part-time jobs, but retains his glamour and inappropriately flaunts it at work
"The Insurance Police Will Not Allow It" (保険ポリスは許さない, Hoken Police wa Yurusanai)	Insurance Police Sayaka	Sayaka Kakehashi	A police officer who arrests people who "take insurance" in their social lives in the Japanese idiomatic sense (e.g. using false modesty and vague statements to avoid personal responsibility or rejection)
"The Mischievous Yan-chan" (やんちゃなやんちゃん, Yanchana Yan-chan)	Yanchana Yan-chan	Saya Kanagawa	The duo sing about how Yan-chan responds to various situations in unpredictable, mischievous ways; Kakki acts as the "straight man" who introduces Yan-chan and sets up each gag
"The Mischievous Yan-chan" (やんちゃなやんちゃん, Yanchana Yan-chan)	Yancha-janai Kakki	Haruka Kaki	The duo sing about how Yan-chan responds to various situations in unpredictable, mischievous ways; Kakki acts as the "straight man" who introduces Yan-chan and sets up each gag
"My Pace Hero! Captain Yuri" (マイペースヒーロー！キャプテン・ユリ)	Captain Yuri	Yuri Kitagawa	An extremely mild-mannered yet powerful superhero, amiable to innocents and evildoers alike
"Setsuna Shōjo" (刹那少女)	Seira	Seira Hayakawa	A trio of cheerful idol singers who instantly switch to a "gloomy" (陰キャ, in'kya) persona while in public to fit their group's brand image
"Setsuna Shōjo" (刹那少女)	Nao	Nao Yumiki	A trio of cheerful idol singers who instantly switch to a "gloomy" (陰キャ, in'kya) persona while in public to fit their group's brand image
"Setsuna Shōjo" (刹那少女)	Runa	Runa Hayashi	A trio of cheerful idol singers who instantly switch to a "gloomy" (陰キャ, in'kya) persona while in public to fit their group's brand image
"Shio's Casino of Love" (恋のSHIO’S CASINO)	Shiori The Love Guide	Shiori Kubo	A croupier who appears in unexpected locations to clarify romantic misunderstandings
"The Skits Ten"	Tetsuko Kuromiyanagi	Haruka Kuromi	Parody of music chart show The Best Ten, hosted by a spoof of Tetsuko Kuroyanagi and occasionally featuring characters from other skits
"Super Socialite Young Lady, Seira Hayanokōji" (スーパーセレブお嬢様早小路セイラ)	Seira Hayanokōji	Seira Hayakawa	A young socialite attempts to do middle-class occupations, despite her unfamiliarity with such work environments
”YouTuber Sutoko”	Sutoko	Yūki Yoda	A YouTuber who speaks in a mix of gyaru slang and Kyushu dialect and possesses persuasive powers implied to be supernatural in nature

== Production ==
According to producer Shinobu Mōri, the idea to create a sketch show for the Nogizaka46 fourth generation members came during production of the group's previous show Nogizaka, Doko e, in which they first appeared in a sketch segment. Several characters developed for Nogizaka Skits were based on the members' distinct personalities as displayed on that show. The Saraba Seishun no Hikari duo have also been the co-hosts of Nogizaka, Doko e and are experienced in sketch comedy, being regular finalists in the TBS Television sketch contest show King of Conte.

Like Nogizaka, Doko e, the first season of Nogizaka Skits exclusively features Nogizaka46 members from the fourth generation, who joined the group in two batches in 2018 and 2020. The second season features the addition of the third generation members, who joined the group in 2016. The show aired for two seasons from 2020 to 2021, followed by a live sketch comedy show and concert titled Nogizaka Skits Live, held through live streaming as the final installment on April 18, 2021.

== Reception ==
Host and television personality Roland mentioned Rei Seimiya's parody of him on his Instagram account, commenting on her character's "inadequate" blond hair compared to his own.

Coconuts and Entame Next praised Shiori Kubo's performance as an "emotionally unstable" casino dealer, masterfully shifting between "cutesy" and "devilish" personalities.
