= Iroha Okuda =

Japanese singer and actress (born 2005)

- Born: August 20, 2005 (age 21); Kanagawa Prefecture, Japan
- Occupations: Singer; actress
- Years active: 2010–2014; 2022–present
- Hometown: Chiba Prefecture
- Agent: Nogizaka46.LLC
- Relatives: Kokoro Okuda (older sister)
- Musical career
- Genre: J-pop
- Instrument: Vocals
- Years active: 2022–present
- Label: Sony
- Member of: Nogizaka46

Japanese name
- Kanji: 奥田いろは
- Hiragana: おくだ いろは
Transcriptions
- Romanization: Okuda Iroha

Iroha Okuda (奥(おく)田(だ) いろは, Okuda Iroha; born August 20, 2005) is a Japanese singer and actress. She is a fifth-generation member of the idol girl group Nogizaka46. Originally debuting as a child actress from 2010 until 2014, she made her return to the entertainment industry as a member of the girl group in 2022. She then also resumed her acting career.

== Early life and career ==
Okuda was born on August 20, 2005, in Kanagawa Prefecture, where she lived until she was five years old, before her family relocated to Chiba Prefecture. Her elder sister is singer and actress Kokoro Okuda.

=== 2010–2014 ===
Okuda began her early career in 2008 at the age of three and regularly appeared in magazines and advertising posters. She was affiliated with the child talent agencies Carotte and Hirata Beans. As a child actress, her most notable role was in NHK's 2011 taiga drama, Gō: The Princesses' Sengoku, as young Hatsu.

=== 2022–present: Nogizaka46 and resumption of acting activities ===
On February 1, 2022, Okuda passed the audition for the fifth generation of Nogizaka46 members.

In 2024, she starred in her first musical play as Juliette in Romeó and Juliette, which began its performances on May 16.

She was the center for the under song "Otoshimono" on the 36th single "Cheat Day", released on August 21, 2024. She was also selected for the first time to sing and perform in live performances in the title song of the 37th single "Shounenbashi", released on December 11.

She served as the center position for the fifth generation's song "Just a Sec." which was included in the 5th album "My Respect" released on January 14, 2026. Okuda also starred in two theatrical stage productions namely, Lady Bess and Secret Garden.

== Filmography ==
=== Film ===
Year	Title	Role	Notes	Ref.
2011	Nekoban: 3D Pop-out Cat	Chizuru Ishii		
2011	Mahoro Station Tada Benriken	Haru		

=== Television ===
Year	Title	Role	Notes	Ref.
2010	The Eighth Day	Marina Akiyama	Final episode	
2011	Gō: The Princesses' Sengoku	Hatsu (young)	Taiga drama; episodes 1, 2, 9, and 10	
2013	Doctor Manbou: A Humorous Tale of Illness	Yuka Kita (young)		
2013	Whatever Will be, Will be	Yume Oki	Season 1; episode 7	
2014	Flowers Bloom Tomorrow	Fuko Imakita (young)	Episode 5	
2014	Garo: The Flower of Hell	Ai	Episode 21	
2014	Whatever Will be, Will be	Yume Oki	Season 2; episode 1	

== Stage ==
=== Theater ===
Year	Title	Role	Notes	Ref.
2024	Roméo et Juliette	Juliette	Lead role	
2025	1789: Les Amants de la Bastille	Olympe du Puget		
2026	Lady Bess	Lady Bess	Lead Role	
2026	Secret Garden	Amy	Lead role	
