= Sorry, Baby (2025 film) =

Film by Eva Victor

- Theatrical release poster
- Directed by: Eva Victor
- Written by: Eva Victor
- Produced by: Adele Romanski; Mark Ceryak; Barry Jenkins
- Starring: Eva Victor; Naomi Ackie; Louis Cancelmi; Kelly McCormack; Lucas Hedges; John Carroll Lynch
- Cinematography: Mia Cioffi Henry
- Edited by: Alex O'Flinn; Randi Atkins
- Music by: Lia Ouyang Rusli
- Production companies: Tango Entertainment; High Frequency Entertainment; Big Beach; Pastel
- Distributed by: A24
- Release dates: January 27, 2025 (Sundance); June 27, 2025 (United States)
- Running time: 103 minutes
- Country: United States
- Language: English
- Budget: c.$1.5 million
- Box office: $3.3 million

Sorry, Baby is a 2025 American black comedy-drama film written and directed by Eva Victor, in their directing debut. Starring Victor, Naomi Ackie, Louis Cancelmi, Kelly McCormack, Lucas Hedges, and John Carroll Lynch. The film follows a reclusive college literature professor struggling with depression following a sexual assault.

The film had its world premiere at the 2025 Sundance Film Festival on January 27, where it won the Waldo Salt Screenwriting Award and received widespread critical acclaim. It was released by A24 in selected theaters in the United States on June 27, before expanding nationwide on July 25. The film grossed $3.3 million worldwide against a production budget of nearly $1.5 million. For their acting, Victor was nominated at the 83rd Golden Globe Awards in Best Actress in a Motion Picture – Drama. For their filmmaking, Victor won Best Directorial Debut from the National Board of Review and was nominated for Best Original Screenplay at the 31st Critics' Choice Awards.

== Plot ==
Agnes Ward is a graduate student in English at Fairport, a liberal arts college in rural Belfast, Maine. She lives with her best friend and fellow graduate student Lydie. Agnes and Lydie are part of a doctoral study group led by professor Preston Decker alongside Natasha, Logan, and Devin. Decker provides Agnes with effusive praise for her draft thesis and shows her his first edition copy of Virginia Woolf's To the Lighthouse; Decker's praise of Agnes inspires bitterness from Natasha.

Decker invites Agnes to his home to discuss further notes on her thesis. She leaves in the middle of the night in a traumatized state. At home, she confides in Lydie that Decker raped her, and Lydie consoles her. The next day, they learn that Decker has resigned from his position. Agnes attempts to report the assault, and though Fairport's disciplinary team offer their condolences, they explain that they can neither investigate nor punish Decker as he is no longer under the college's employ.

Agnes takes in a stray kitten that she names Olga. One night, she obtains lighter fluid from her neighbor Gavin. She contemplates using it to set Decker's office on fire, which Lydie offers to do herself, but she reconsiders. She admits that she does not want to press charges, as Decker co-parents a child with his ex-wife.

A year later, Agnes is called for jury duty. During voir dire, Agnes admits that she is unsure if she can be impartial due to her experience being assaulted, and that she did not want Decker to go to prison, believing it would not do anything to make him a better person. She is dismissed from jury duty as a result.

Three years after the assault, Agnes has begun a sexual relationship with Gavin. She is offered a full-time teaching position at Fairport, which she accepts proudly, and is given Decker's former office.

While teaching Lolita to her students, Agnes is visited by Natasha. Jealous that Agnes was offered the full-time position over her, Natasha brusquely reveals to Agnes that she had consensual sex with Decker while she was his student. While driving, Agnes suffers a panic attack and pulls into the parking lot of a sandwich shop. The shop's sympathetic owner, Pete, calms her down and gives her a free sandwich, leading to a friendly conversation. Later, Agnes invites Gavin to her house for sex and they tenderly share a bath together. Gavin expresses interest in a deeper commitment with Agnes, but she appears hesitant to reciprocate.

The next year, Lydie, who has graduated and moved to New York City and met her spouse Fran, returns to Belfast to stay with Agnes for several days. Lydie tells Agnes that she and Fran are expecting a baby. Concerned for Agnes's well-being, Lydie implores her not to end her life by suicide. Lydie and Agnes continue to have a supportive and strong bond; Agnes asks Lydie to visit again soon.

Lydie gives birth to a daughter, Jane. Lydie and Fran visit Agnes with Jane, whom Agnes offers to look after while the couple visits a nearby lighthouse. Agnes softly speaks to Jane, encouraging her to confide in Agnes, offering condolences for having been brought into a world where bad things can happen, and expressing hope that Jane will live a happy life in spite of this.

== Cast ==
- Eva Victor as Agnes Ward, a young graduate student and later literature professor
- Naomi Ackie as Lydie, Agnes's best friend
- Lucas Hedges as Gavin, Agnes's neighbor and love interest
- Louis Cancelmi as Preston Decker, Agnes's thesis advisor
- Kelly McCormack as Natasha, Agnes's classmate
- John Carroll Lynch as Pete, a sandwich shop owner
- Hettienne Park as Eleanor Winston
- E. R. Fightmaster as Fran, Lydie's spouse
- Cody Reiss as Devin
- Jordan Mendoza as Logan
- Jonathan Myles as the man she thought was Decker
- Liz Bishop as Elizabeth
- Natalie Rotter-Laitman as Claire
- Alison Wachtler as clerk
- Priscilla Manning as Andrea Fuller
- Celeste Oliva as Sophie
- Chhoyang Cheshatsang as Thomas
- Conor Patrick Sweeney as Jeremy

== Production ==
Sorry, Baby was written and directed by Eva Victor and produced by Adele Romanski, Mark Ceryak, and Barry Jenkins. Victor is also in the lead cast that includes Naomi Ackie, Lucas Hedges, John Carroll Lynch, Louis Cancelmi, and Kelly McCormack. Victor shadowed Jane Schoenbrun during the production of I Saw the TV Glow before filming Sorry, Baby.

Principal photography took place in Ipswich, Massachusetts, in March 2024. The film was shot on an Alexa Mini LF camera and edited using Media Composer. Lia Ouyang Rusli composed the original film score for the film.

== Release ==
Sorry, Baby premiered at the Sundance Film Festival on January 27, 2025. In early February, A24 acquired worldwide distribution rights to the film for $8 million after a bidding war with studios including Searchlight Pictures, Neon, and Mubi. The film served as the closing film of the Directors' Fortnight section at the Cannes Film Festival on May 22, 2025. The film was given a limited theatrical release in the United States on June 27, 2025, before expanding to a nationwide release on July 25.

It was screened at the 72nd Sydney Film Festival on June 12, 2025, it opened the 78th Edinburgh International Film Festival on August 14, 2025, and was showcased at the 53rd Norwegian International Film Festival in the Main Programme section on August 16, 2025. It also made it to the Official Section of the 70th Valladolid International Film Festival. It was screened in competition in the 36th Stockholm International Film Festival on November 7, 2025.

== Reception ==
=== Critical response ===
On the review aggregator website Rotten Tomatoes, 97% of 200 critics' reviews are positive, with an average rating of 8.4/10. The website's consensus reads: "Carrying off difficult subject matter with a light touch and wry sense of humor, Sorry, Baby triumphantly announces writer-director and star Eva Victor as a formidable talent." Metacritic, which uses a weighted average, assigned the film a score of 90 out of 100, based on 36 critics, indicating "universal acclaim". In June 2025, IndieWire ranked the film at number 77 on its list of "The 100 Best Movies of the 2020s (So Far)".

=== Accolades ===
Organization	Date of ceremony	Category	Recipient(s)	Result	Ref.
Alliance of Women Film Journalists	31 December 2025	Best Screenplay, Original	Eva Victor	Nominated	
Alliance of Women Film Journalists	31 December 2025	Best Woman Director	Eva Victor	Nominated	
Alliance of Women Film Journalists	31 December 2025	Best Female Screenwriter	Eva Victor	Won	
Alliance of Women Film Journalists	31 December 2025	Best Women's Breakthrough Performance	Eva Victor	Nominated	
Artios Awards	February 26, 2026	Feature Low Budget – Comedy or Drama	Jessica Kelly	Won	
Astra Awards	January 9, 2026	Best Actress – Comedy or Musical	Eva Victor	Nominated	
Astra Awards	January 9, 2026	Best Indie Feature	Sorry, Baby	Nominated	
Astra Awards	January 9, 2026	Best First Feature	Sorry, Baby	Won	
Astra Midseason Movie Awards	July 3, 2025	Best Picture	Sorry, Baby	Nominated	
Astra Midseason Movie Awards	July 3, 2025	Best Actress	Eva Victor	Runner-up	
Astra Midseason Movie Awards	July 3, 2025	Best Screenplay	Sorry, Baby	Nominated	
Austin Film Critics Association	December 18, 2025	Best First Film	Eva Victor	Won	
British Independent Film Awards	November 30, 2025	Best International Independent Film	Eva Victor, Adele Romanski, Mark Ceryak, Barry Jenkins	Nominated	
Cannes Film Festival	May 24, 2025	Directors' Fortnight	Eva Victor	Nominated	
Cannes Film Festival	May 24, 2025	Camera d'Or	Eva Victor	Nominated	
Cannes Film Festival	May 24, 2025	Queer Palm	Eva Victor	Nominated	
Critics' Choice Movie Awards	January 4, 2026	Best Original Screenplay	Eva Victor	Nominated	
Directors Guild of America Awards	February 7, 2026	Michael Apted Award for Outstanding Directorial Achievement in First-Time Theatrical Feature Film	Eva Victor	Nominated	
Georgia Film Critics Association	December 27, 2025	Best Picture	Sorry, Baby	Nominated	
Georgia Film Critics Association	December 27, 2025	Best Actress	Eva Victor	Nominated	
Georgia Film Critics Association	December 27, 2025	Best Original Screenplay	Eva Victor	Nominated	
Golden Globe Awards	January 11, 2026	Best Actress in a Motion Picture – Drama	Eva Victor	Nominated	
Gotham Film Awards	December 1, 2025	Best Feature	Mark Ceryak, Barry Jenkins, and Adele Romanski	Nominated	
Gotham Film Awards	December 1, 2025	Best Original Screenplay	Eva Victor	Nominated	
Film Independent Spirit Awards	February 16, 2026	Best Feature	Mark Ceryak, Barry Jenkins, and Adele Romanski	Nominated	
Film Independent Spirit Awards	February 16, 2026	Best Director	Eva Victor	Nominated	
Film Independent Spirit Awards	February 16, 2026	Best Supporting Performance	Naomi Ackie	Won	
Film Independent Spirit Awards	February 16, 2026	Best Screenplay	Eva Victor	Won	
Las Culturistas Culture Awards	August 5, 2025	We Could See Boop! Award for Best Thing to See	Sorry, Baby & Eva Victor	Nominated	
London Film Critics' Circle	February 1, 2026	Film of the Year	Sorry, Baby	Nominated	
London Film Critics' Circle	February 1, 2026	Actress of the Year	Eva Victor	Nominated	
London Film Critics' Circle	February 1, 2026	Screenwriter of the Year	Eva Victor	Nominated	
London Film Critics' Circle	February 1, 2026	Breakthrough Performer of the Year	Eva Victor	Nominated	
London Film Critics' Circle	February 1, 2026	British/Irish Performer of the Year	Naomi Ackie	Nominated	
Los Angeles Film Critics Association Awards	December 7, 2025	Best Screenplay	Eva Victor	Runner-up	
Miskolc International Film Festival	September 13, 2025	Emeric Pressburger Prize	Sorry, Baby	Nominated	
Mill Valley Film Festival	October 5, 2025	Mind the Gap Award	Eva Victor	Won	
National Board of Review	January 13, 2026	Best Directorial Debut	Eva Victor	Won	
National Board of Review	January 13, 2026	Top 10 Independent Films	Sorry, Baby	Won (Note: Award shared with nine other films.)	
Phoenix Film Critics Society	December 15, 2025	Top Ten Films	Sorry, Baby	Won (Note: Award shared with nine other films.)	
Seattle Film Critics Society	December 15, 2025	Best Picture	Sorry, Baby	Nominated	
Seattle Film Critics Society	December 15, 2025	Best Actress	Eva Victor	Nominated	
Seattle Film Critics Society	December 15, 2025	Best Screenplay	Eva Victor	Nominated	
Seattle International Film Festival	May 25, 2025	Seattle Critics Award	Sorry, Baby	Won	
Stockholm International Film Festival	November 14, 2025	Golden Horse	Sorry, Baby	Nominated	
Sundance Film Festival	February 2, 2025	Grand Jury Prize – U.S. Dramatic Competition	Sorry, Baby	Nominated	
Sundance Film Festival	February 2, 2025	Waldo Salt Screenwriting Award	Eva Victor	Won	
St. Louis Film Critics Association Awards	December 14, 2025	Best Original Screenplay	Eva Victor	Nominated	
St. Louis Film Critics Association Awards	December 14, 2025	Best First Feature Film	Eva Victor	Won	
Sydney Film Festival	June 15, 2025	Sydney Film Prize	Sorry, Baby	Nominated	
Valladolid International Film Festival	November 1, 2025	Golden Spike	Sorry, Baby	Nominated	
Valladolid International Film Festival	November 1, 2025	Best Actress	Eva Victor	Won	

== Works cited ==
- Rapold, Nicolas (2025). "Chapter Break". Filmmaker. Vol. 33, no. 4. The Gotham Film & Media Institute.
