= Happyend =

- Japanese theatrical release poster
- Directed by: Neo Sora
- Written by: Neo Sora
- Produced by: Albert Tholen; Aiko Masubuchi; Eric Nyari; Anthony Chen; Alex C. Lo
- Starring: Hayato Kurihara; Yukito Hidaka; Yuta Hayashi; Shina Peng; ARAZI; Kilala Inori; Ayumu Nakajima; Masaru Yahagi; PUSHIM; Makiko Watanabe; Shirō Sano
- Cinematography: Bill Kirstein
- Edited by: Albert Tholen
- Music by: Lia Ouyang Rusli
- Production companies: Zakkubalan; Cineric Creative; Cinema Inutile; Giraffe Pictures; Spark Features; Sons of Rigor
- Distributed by: Bitters End (Japan); Film Movement (United States)
- Release dates: September 2, 2024 (Venice); October 4, 2024 (Japan); September 12, 2025 (United States)
- Running time: 113 minutes
- Countries: Japan; United States
- Language: Japanese
- Box office: $1 million

Happyend (stylized in all caps) is a 2024 dystopian coming-of-age drama film written and directed by Neo Sora. Set in a near-future Tokyo, it stars Kurihara Hayato and Hidaka Yukito as two high school best friends whose friendship is tested before graduation. Ayumu Nakajima, Makiko Watanabe, and Shirō Sano appear in supporting roles.

The film premiered at the 81st Venice International Film Festival on September 2, 2024, in the Orizzonti section. It was released in Japan on October 4, 2024, by Bitters End, and was released in the United States on September 12, 2025, by Film Movement.

== Plot ==
Set in a near-future Tokyo, Happyend follows five high school friends, Yuta, Kou, Ata-chan, Ming and Tomu, during their final year of school. The group share an interest in electronic music and regularly attend underground parties. Yuta and Kou are childhood best friends, but their carefree lives unfold against the threat of a catastrophic earthquake and growing political unrest.

After attending an illegal party that is interrupted by police, the friends sneak into their school and pull a prank on their principal, Nagai, by positioning his car vertically in the schoolyard. In response, Nagai introduces an AI-powered surveillance system that monitors students' movements and behaviour, recording violations of school regulations. The new measures provoke resentment among the students, who begin questioning the administration's authority.

Meanwhile, the Japanese government introduces emergency measures in anticipation of the earthquake and promotes increasingly nationalistic policies. Kou, who comes from a Zainichi Korean family, becomes more conscious of discrimination and social inequality. After meeting Fumi, a politically active student, he develops an interest in activism and begins participating in protests against the government's policies and the school's surveillance system.

As Kou becomes increasingly involved in political resistance, his relationship with Yuta begins to change. While Kou wants to challenge the restrictions imposed on their lives, Yuta remains more interested in music and spending time with their friends. Their contrasting attitudes create tension in their longstanding friendship as graduation approaches.

The conflict between the students and the school administration eventually escalates. Kou becomes more openly involved in protests against Panopty, while disagreements between him and Yuta become increasingly difficult to resolve. Following an argument, Kou is detained, further intensifying the tension surrounding the student movement. As graduation approaches, Kou and Fumi organise a sit-in inside the principal's office, demanding that the school remove its surveillance system. Nagai agrees to consider their demands but insists that the students responsible for the original prank to come forward and take responsibility. Yuta eventually steps forward and take the blame for his involvement in the prank, which results in his expulsion.

Following graduation, the friends reunite to say goodbye to one of their companions, who is preparing to move to the United States. Yuta and Kou encounter each other again, briefly returning to the familiar banter that characterised their friendship before their disagreements. Although their reunion recalls the closeness they once shared, both have begun moving towards different futures. As they eventually part ways, their friendship remains a reflection of the changes and uncertainties that have shaped their final years of adolescence.

== Cast ==
- Hayato Kurihara as Yuta (ユウタ, Yūta)
- Yukito Hidaka as Kou (コウ, Kō)
- Yuta Hayashi as Ata-chan
- Shina Peng as Ming
- Arazi as Tomu
- Kilala Inori as Fumi
- Pushim as Fukuko
- Ayumu Nakajima as Okada
- Makiko Watanabe as Yuko
- Shirō Sano as Principal Nagai
- Masaru Yahagi as Taira
- Yousuke Yukimatsu as DJ

== Production ==
In August 2020, it was announced that Neo Sora would direct the film, then titled Earthquake, from a screenplay he wrote. The film was selected for the 2022 Sundance Institute Screenwriting and Directing labs.

== Release ==
The film had its world premiere at the 81st Venice International Film Festival on September 2, 2024, in the Orizzonti section. Prior to, Metrograph Pictures acquired North American distribution rights to the film. It will also screen at the 2024 Toronto International Film Festival on September 9, 2024. and the 2024 New York Film Festival. It was released in Japan on October 4, 2024, by Bitters End. It was scheduled to be released in the United States on June 20, 2025, however was pulled from the schedule. In July 2025, Metrograph Pictures was announced to no longer be distributing the film. In July 2025, Film Movement acquired distribution rights to the film, and set it for a September 12, 2025, release.

It was also invited at the 29th Busan International Film Festival in 'Special program in focus' Teenage Minds, Teenage Movies section and it will be screened there in October 2024. And take part in the 'First Feature Competition' of the 2024 BFI London Film Festival. The film will make its South Asia premiere at the MAMI Mumbai Film Festival 2024 in the World Cinema section.

== Themes ==
Happyend explores how political unrest and personal relationships intersect. The film centers on a friendship that fractures as one character becomes politically active while the other withdraws. Director Neo Sora contrasts small, personal moments with broader social shifts, touching on themes such as surveillance, youth disillusionment, and state control. The story also engages with questions of Japanese identity, xenophobia, and historical amnesia, particularly regarding Japan's colonial past. Underground music scenes and resistance to AI-generated culture reflect the characters’ pushback against commercialization and conformity. The film also addresses the limited political agency of marginalized groups, including Japan's Zainichi Korean community.

== Reception ==
=== Critical response ===
On the review aggregator website Rotten Tomatoes, 98% of 53 critics' reviews are positive. The website's consensus reads: "Balancing sharp social satire with tender adolescent drama, Happyend is a crisp and heartfelt story that quietly captures the enormous emotional stakes of youth on the cusp of adulthood." Metacritic, which uses a weighted average, assigned the film a score of 75 out of 100, based on 10 critics, indicating "generally favorable" reviews.

The Hollywood Reporter's David Rooney praised Happyend for its "expert tonal balance between the bittersweet, elegiac qualities of the end-of-school drama" and its portrayal of an educational institution "that becomes like a prison," reflecting broader political anxieties. He noted the film's "light yet lingering touch to larger fears affecting all of us" while remaining grounded in the personal. Rooney also highlighted Bill Kirstein's cinematography for "finding poetry in the stark urban landscapes," and noted that Lia Ouyang Rusli's score complemented the visuals. He described the mostly newcomer cast as "naturals." Writing for Screen Daily, Jonathan Romney described the film as "a crisp and understated piece" and highlighted Bill Kirstein's cinematography for its use of "nocturnal cityscapes" and "sterile empty spaces" within school settings. He also noted the young cast's "organic energy," though remarked they were "unconvincingly a little heavy on the pop star looks."

Slate's Marshall Shaffer rated the film 2 out of 4 stars, writing that the director "struggles to balance the immediacy of adolescent angst with the long-range outlook of using the students’ experience as a canary in the coal mine for society at large." The review noted that Happyend "never quite satisfies as a microcosmic analysis of Japan" due to limited depiction of the world outside the school. While describing the film as a "confident narrative feature debut" with insight into generational and national direction, Shaffer notes that it lacks "connective tissue between the small details and Sora's bigger-picture views." Whang Yee Ling of The Straits Times gave it 3 out of 5 stars, describing it as "unassuming but emotionally textured." The Guardian voted the film as one of the best to be released in the U.K. in 2025, calling it "beguiling debut feature set in an oppressive near-future Japan."

=== Accolades ===
Award	Year	Category	Recipient(s)	Result	Ref.
Asia Pacific Screen Awards	2024	Best Film	Happyend	Nominated	
Asia Pacific Screen Awards	2024	Best Screenplay	Neo Sora	Nominated	
Asia Pacific Screen Awards	2024	Young Cinema Award	Neo Sora	Won	
BFI London Film Festival	2024	Sutherland Trophy	Neo Sora	Nominated	
Jogja-NETPAC Asian Film Festival	2024	Golden Hanoman Award	Neo Sora	Won	
Pingyao International Film Festival	2024	Roberto Rossellini Jury Award	Neo Sora	Won	
QCinema International Film Festival	2024	Best Screenplay	Neo Sora	Won	
Taipei Golden Horse Film Festival	2024	NETPAC Award	Happyend	Nominated	
Taipei Golden Horse Film Festival	2024	Observation Missions for Asian Cinema Award	Happyend	Won	
Venice Film Festival	2024	Orizzonti	Neo Sora	Nominated	

== See also ==
- Mundane science fiction
