= Asahinagu (film) =

- Theatrical release poster

Japanese name
- Kanji: あさひなぐ
Transcriptions
- Revised Hepburn: Asahinagu
- Directed by: Tsutomu Hanabusa
- Based on: Asahinagu by Ai Kozaki
- Produced by: Takahiro Kanamori; Tomoharu Kajiwara; Tatsuro Hayashi
- Starring: Nanase Nishino; Mai Shiraishi; Reika Sakurai; Sayuri Matsumura; Tomoya Nakamura; Noriko Eguchi
- Music by: Michiru
- Production companies: Robot; North River
- Distributed by: Toho; Universal Pictures
- Release date: September 22, 2017
- Running time: 105 minutes
- Country: Japan
- Language: Japanese

Asahinagu (Japanese: あさひなぐ) is a 2017 Japanese film based around the martial art of the naginata and fencing. It was directed by Tsutomu Hanabusa and is based on the sports/slice of life manga also called Asahinagu by Ai Kozaki.

== Plot ==
The film centres around Tojima Asahi, and her adventures in her first year of high school. Tojima is a first-grade high school student. She is small and weak physically. Determined to change herself, she enrolls in the school's Naginata Club. Asahi is also inspired to join the club due to their strongest member, Miyaji Maharu, who also helped her to hit a pervert flashing at Asahi. Asahi discovers the group to be run by Sensei Kobayashi, a somewhat stupid teacher and the "ATM" or "wallet" of the team, but the team nevertheless is made up of somewhat competent and motivated members. The team are initially less than confident in her abilities due to her petite size, but are very encouraging. While discovering the training to be gruelling, Asahi is inspired by the other members. On their first training camp at a temple, the meet the hardened shinto priestess, Jukei who while pushing them through gruelling training, also inspires them and teaches them some winning techniques. Along the way, Asahi also develops a romance with Miyaji's brother, Miyaji Natsuyuki. The team develop a rivalry with another school team. Following a loss to rival Ichido, Miyaji drops out of the team. Asahi persists in encouraging her, until she rejoins the team. The team then works hard together for the national competition.

== Cast ==
- Asahi Tōjima played by Nanase Nishino
- Maharu Miyaji played by Mai Shiraishi
- Shōko Yasomura played by Reika Sakurai
- Sakura Konno played by Sayuri Matsumura
- Nene Ichidō played by Erika Ikuta
- Sensei Kobayashi played by Tomoya Nakamura
- Jyukei played by Noriko Eguchi
- Eri Nogami played by Marika Itō
