= Bruiser (2022 film) =

- Official release poster
- Directed by: Miles Warren
- Written by: Ben Medina; Miles Warren
- Produced by: Aaron Ryder; Jewerl Ross; Scott Lumpkin; Scott Frank; Trevante Rhodes
- Starring: Trevante Rhodes; Shamier Anderson; Jalyn Hall; Shinelle Azoroh
- Cinematography: Justin Derry
- Edited by: James LeSage
- Music by: Lia Ouyang Rusli
- Production companies: Ryder Picture Company; Lyrical Media; Toula67 Entertainment
- Distributed by: Onyx Collective; Hulu
- Release dates: September 2022 (Toronto); February 24, 2023 (Hulu)
- Running time: 97 minutes
- Country: United States
- Language: English

Bruiser is a 2022 American drama film written by Ben Medina and Miles Warren, directed by Warren and starring Trevante Rhodes, Shamier Anderson, Jalyn Hall and Shinelle Azoroh.

== Plot ==
Darious is a 14-year-old boy who lives with his Step-father Malcolm and mother Monica. Malcolm urges Darious not to fight or act aggressively towards others, reflecting on his own violent childhood and strained relationship with his father. One day, after getting beaten up in an altercation with another boy, Darious walks into a woodland area and meets a man named Porter, who lives alone in a small boat. Darious and Porter bond, with Porter teaching Darious some self-defense skills.

It's eventually revealed that Porter is Darious's biological father who had abandoned Darious at birth. Now, however, Porter is eager to reconnect with Darious. Malcolm and Monica become aware of this and disapprove of Darious forming a relationship with Porter. Malcolm remembers Porter's past, which was full of violence, and he is eager to protect Darious. Nevertheless, Darious and Porter continue to strengthen their bond, and Darious resists Malcolm's attempts to keep them apart.

One night, after a family argument, Darious flees with Porter. Porter insists that he take Darious away from Malcolm and Monica and that they start a new life together, about which Darious appears hesitant. Malcolm eventually tracks the two down by the side of a road, puts Darious in his car, and proceeds to fight with Porter. Malcolm and Porter continue to fight in the darkness of the night as Darious drives the car back home.

== Cast ==
- Trevante Rhodes as Porter
- Shamier Anderson as Malcolm
- Jalyn Hall as Darious
- Shinelle Azoroh as Monica
- Frank Oakley III as Officer Ron Evans
- Sarah Bock as Mia
- Jonah Bishop-Pirrone as Mike
- Kiah Alexandria Clingman as Sissy
- Moses Jones as Ernest

== Release ==
The film premiered at the Toronto International Film Festival in September 2022. It was announced that same month that Bruiser was the first narrative feature film to be acquired by Onyx Collective. It was released by Hulu in the United States on February 24, 2023.

== Reception ==
=== Critical response ===
On the review aggregator website Rotten Tomatoes, 100% of 25 critics' reviews are positive, with an average rating of 7.9/10. Metacritic gave the film a weighted average score of 81 out of 100 based on 10 critic reviews, indicating "generally favorable reviews".

Peter Debruge of Variety gave the film a positive review and wrote, "Insightful and universal in so many ways, Warren's first feature is a confident if sometimes oblique coming-of-age story from an important new voice..." Lovia Gyarkye of The Hollywood Reporter also gave the film a positive review, calling it "A mellow and compelling spin on a familiar story." Alex Saveliev of Film Threat rated the film a 9 out of 10 and wrote, "Warren's film may leave you bruised, but don't let that stop you from seeking it out."

=== Accolades ===
Year	Award	Category	Nominee(s)	Result	Ref.
2023	AAFCA Awards	Emerging Face	Jalyn Hall	Won	
2023	Independent Spirit Awards	Best Supporting Performance	Trevante Rhodes	Nominated	
2024	Black Reel Awards for Television	Outstanding Supporting Performance in a TV Movie/Limited Series	Trevante Rhodes	Nominated	
