= Asahinagu =

Japanese manga series

- First tankōbon volume cover, featuring Asahi Tōjima

あさひなぐ
- Genre: Sports
- Manga
- Written by: Ai Kozaki
- Published by: Shogakukan
- Magazine: Big Comic Spirits
- Original run: January 24, 2011 – September 7, 2020
- Volumes: 34
- Live-action film
- Asahinagu (2017)

Asahinagu (あさひなぐ; "Asahi Knocks Them Off Their Feet") is a Japanese manga series written and illustrated by Ai Kozaki. It revolves around the life of a timid girl who joins a naginata club to improve herself. It was serialized in Shogakukan's Big Comic Spirits magazine from January 2011 to September 2020, with its chapters compiled into thirty-four tankōbon volumes.

It was adapted into a stage play in 2017. A live-action film adaptation of the manga was released in September 2017.

By September 2020, the manga had over 3.9 million copies in circulation. in 2015, Asahinagu won the 60th Shogakukan Manga Award in the General category.

== Plot ==
Asahi Higashijima entered Futatsuzaka High School in Tokyo. In her junior high school days, she was in the art club. On the first day of school when she was thinking about joining the sports club in high school, she met Maharu Miyaji on the train on her way to school. On the day of the club activity introduction at school, she ended up going to see the naginata club, and when she went to see it, she admired Maharu and decided to join the club because she wanted to become a strong person.

== Characters ==
- Asahi Tōjima
- Maharu Miyaji
- Shōko Yasomura
- Sakura Konno

== Media ==
=== Manga ===
Written and illustrated by Ai Kozaki, Asahinagu was serialized in Shogakukan's Big Comic Spirits from January 24, 2011, to September 7, 2020. Shogakukan collected its chapters in 34 tankōbon volumes, released from April 28, 2011, to September 30, 2020.

==== Volumes ====
No.	Japanese release date	Japanese ISBN
1	April 28, 2011	978-4-09-183798-1
2	July 29, 2011	978-4-09-183899-5
3	October 28, 2011	978-4-09-184119-3
4	February 29, 2012	978-4-09-184260-2
5	May 30, 2012	978-4-09-184510-8
6	August 30, 2012	978-4-09-184510-8
7	November 30, 2012	978-4-09-184766-9
8	March 29, 2013	978-4-09-185025-6
9	July 30, 2013	978-4-09-185344-8
10	November 29, 2013	978-4-09-185662-3
11	March 28, 2014	978-4-09-186026-2
12	July 30, 2014	978-4-09-186305-8
13	October 30, 2014	978-4-09-186509-0
14	February 27, 2015	978-4-09-186780-3
15	May 29, 2015	978-4-09-187019-3
16	August 28, 2015	978-4-09-187170-1
17	November 30, 2015	978-4-09-187330-9
18	February 29, 2016	978-4-09-187468-9
19	May 30, 2016	978-4-09-187615-7
20	August 30, 2016	978-4-09-187769-7
21	November 30, 2016	978-4-09-189230-0
22	February 28, 2017	978-4-09-189369-7
23	May 31, 2017	978-4-09-189508-0
24	September 12, 2017	978-4-09-189635-3
25	January 30, 2018	978-4-09-189784-8
26	April 27, 2018	978-4-09-189861-6
27	July 30, 2018	978-4-09-860046-5
28	November 30, 2018	978-4-09-860136-3
29	February 28, 2019	978-4-09-860222-3
30	May 30, 2019	978-4-09-860285-8
31	September 30, 2019	978-4-09-860407-4
32	January 30, 2020	978-4-09-860527-9
33	May 29, 2020	978-4-09-860527-9
34	September 30, 2020	978-4-09-860710-5

=== Live-action film ===
A live action film adaptation of the manga was released on September 22, 2017; starring the idols of Nogizaka46.

=== Stage play ===
It was adapted into a stage play in 2017.

== Reception ==
Asahinagu won the award for Best General Manga at the 60th Shogakukan Manga Award in 2015. The manga won the Mandō Kobayashi Manga Grand Prix 2016, created by comedian and manga enthusiast Kendo Kobayashi. Asahinagu ranked 17th on Takarajimasha's Kono Manga ga Sugoi! list of best manga of 2012 for male readers. The manga ranked 9th on the "Nationwide Bookstore Employees' Recommended Comics" by the Honya Club website in 2012.

As of September 2020, the manga had over 3.9 million copies in circulation. Volume 5 reached the 26th place on the weekly Oricon manga charts and, as of June 3, 2012, has sold 22,686 copies; volume 6 reached the 29th place and, as of September 2, 2012, has sold 23,253 copies; volume 9 reached the 45th place and, as of August 4, 2013, has sold 27,893 copies; volume 10 reached the 39th place and, as of December 1, 2013, has sold 19,230 copies and volume 12 reached the 37th place and, as of August 3, 2014, has sold 23,263 copies.
