= List of Japanese films of 2025 =

This is a list of Japanese films that are scheduled to release in 2025.

== Highest-grossing films ==
The following is a list of the 10 highest-grossing Japanese films released at the Japanese box office during 2025.

Rank	Title	Gross
1	Demon Slayer: Kimetsu no Yaiba – The Movie: Infinity Castle	¥39.14 billion ($247.23 million)
2	Kokuho	¥19.55 billion ($123.49 million)
3	Detective Conan: One-eyed Flashback	¥14.74 billion ($93.1 million)
4	Chainsaw Man – The Movie: Reze Arc	¥10.43 billion ($65.88 million)
5	Cells at Work!	¥6.36 billion ($40.17 million)
6	Tokyo MER: Mobile Emergency Room – Nankai Mission	¥5.29 billion ($33.41 million)
7	Exit 8	¥5.17 billion ($32.66 million)
8	Doraemon: Nobita's Art World Tales	¥4.61 billion ($29.12 million)
9	La Grande Maison Paris	¥4.20 billion ($26.53 million)
10	Mobile Suit Gundam GQuuuuuuX: Beginning	¥3.62 billion ($22.87 million)

== Released ==
=== January – March ===
Opening		Title	Director	Cast	Ref.
J A N U A R Y	10	Solitary Gourmet the Movie	Yutaka Matsushige	Yutaka Matsushige, Yuki Uchida, Hayato Isomura, Anne Watanabe, Joe Odagiri, Sansei Shiomi, Takehiro Murata, Yoo Jae-myung	
J A N U A R Y	10	366 Days	Takehiko Shinjō	Eiji Akaso, Moka Kamishiraishi, Yuto Nakajima, Tina Tamashiro, Junpei Mizobata, Ryōko Kuninaka, Hikari Ishida, Tetta Sugimoto	
J A N U A R Y	10	Shinpei	Seijirō Kōyama	Nakamura Hashinosuke IV, Mirai Shida, Dai Watanabe, Toshiyuki Someya, Takahiro Miura, Yoichi Hayashi, Naoto Ogata	
J A N U A R Y	10	Salary Man Kintaro	Ten Shimoyama	Nobuyuki Suzuki, Yu Shirota, Nicole Ishida, Yuka Kageyama, Yuka Takeshima, Toshinori Omi, Takaaki Enoki	
J A N U A R Y	10	Welcome Back	Naoto Kawashima	Kaito Yoshimura, Yugo Mikawa, Yuya Endo, Yoshinori Miyata, Shun Sugata	
J A N U A R Y	17	Muromachi Outsiders	Yu Irie	Yo Oizumi, Kento Nagao, Shinichi Tsutsumi, Akira Emoto, Kazuki Kitamura, Wakana Matsumoto, Yuya Endo, Tomoya Maeno, Ami201	
J A N U A R Y	17	How to Forget You	Yū Sakudō	Ryōta Bandō, Nanase Nishino, Kaho Minami, Wan Marui, Hisato Kokubo, Yoshinori Okada, Kanji Tsuda, Morio Kazama	
J A N U A R Y	17	The Harbor Lights	Mojiri Adachi	Miu Tomita, Marika Itō, Yuzu Aoki, Suzu Yamanouchi, Wasabi Nakagawa, Masahiro Kōmoto	
J A N U A R Y	17	Teki Cometh	Daihachi Yoshida	Kyōzō Nagatsuka, Kumi Takiuchi, Yuumi Kawai, Asuka Kurosawa, Takashi Matsuo	
J A N U A R Y	17	Sunset Sunrise	Yoshiyuki Kishi	Masaki Suda, Mao Inoue, Takehara Pistol, Hiroshi Yamamoto, Ken Miyake, Chizuru Ikewaki, Fumiyo Kohinata, Masatoshi Nakamura	
J A N U A R Y	17	Colorful Stage! The Movie: A Miku Who Can't Sing	Hiroyuki Hata	Saki Fujita, Asami Shimoda, Yū Asakawa, Meiko Haigou, Naoto Fuuga	
J A N U A R Y	24	Snowflowers: Seeds of Hope	Takashi Koizumi	Tori Matsuzaka, Kyoko Yoshine, Takahiro Miura, Gaku Yamamoto, Hidetaka Yoshioka, Koji Yakusho	
J A N U A R Y	24	Under Ninja	Yūichi Fukuda	Kento Yamazaki, Minami Hamabe, Shotaro Mamiya, Mai Shiraishi, Amane Okayama, Chihiro Yamamoto, Ryubi Miyase, Ryōtarō Sakaguchi, Mitsuru Hirata	
J A N U A R Y	24	Demon Virus	Yukito Matsuno	Anna Murashige, Masaki Ota, Ryuta Kuwayama, Yōji Tanaka	
J A N U A R Y	24	Missing Child Videotape	Ryota Kondo	Rairu Sugita, Amon Hirai, Kokoro Morita, Takashi Fujii	
J A N U A R Y	24	Miharu ni Kasa o	Yu Shibuya	Takeshi Masu, Marin Hidaka, Misato Tanaka	
J A N U A R Y	24	Welcome to the Village	Hideo Jojo	Mai Fukagawa, Ryuya Wakaba, Tomorowo Taguchi, Kaoru Sugita, Yuya Matsuura	
J A N U A R Y	24	Cute High Earth Defense Club Eternal Love!	Shinji Takamatsu	Kazutomi Yamamoto, Yūichirō Umehara, Koutaro Nishiyama, Yusuke Shirai, Toshiki Masuda, Mugihito	
J A N U A R Y	25	Yukiko a.k.a	Naoya Kusaba	Rio Yamashita, Hina Higuchi, Fusako Urabe, Daichi Watanabe, Takumi Ishida, Ayame Goriki, Ryo Ishibashi	
J A N U A R Y	31	Make a Girl	Genshō Yasuda	Atsumi Tanezaki, Shun Horie, Toshiki Masuda, Sora Amamiya	
J A N U A R Y	31	Blazing Fists	Takashi Miike	Danhi Kinoshita, Kaname Yoshizawa, Mariko Shinoda, Anna Tsuchiya, Katsunori Takahashi, Gackt	
J A N U A R Y	31	Suicide Notes Laid on the Table	Tsutomu Hanabusa	Hokuto Yoshino, Ryubi Miyase, Sara Shida, Minato Matsui, Akari Takaishi, Miona Hori, Shugo Oshinari	
J A N U A R Y	31	The Rose of Versailles	Ai Yoshimura	Miyuki Sawashiro, Aya Hirano, Toshiyuki Toyonaga, Kazuki Kato	
J A N U A R Y	31	Kaiju Guy!	Junichiro Yagi	Gunpi, Yūka Sugai, Tōru Tezuka, Mito Natsume, Hiroyuki Hirayama, Yōji Tanaka, Akaji Maro, Michiko Shimizu	
F E B R U A R Y	1	The Rightman	Takayuki Takuma	Akio Kaneda, Kenji Hamatani, Natsume Mito, Masami Yamamoto, Tamao Nakamura	
F E B R U A R Y	7	1st Kiss	Ayuko Tsukahara	Takako Matsu, Hokuto Matsumura, Riho Yoshioka, Nana Mori, Lily Franky	
F E B R U A R Y	7	Under the Big Onion	Shogo Kusano	Fūju Kamio, Hiyori Sakurada, Aoi Ito, Taiyu Fujiwara, Airu Kubozuka, Nanami Taki, Yōsuke Eguchi	
F E B R U A R Y	7	Salary Man Kintaro 2	Ten Shimoyama	Nobuyuki Suzuki, Yu Shirota, Nicole Ishida, Yuka Kageyama, Yuka Takeshima, Toshinori Omi, Takaaki Enoki	
F E B R U A R Y	7	Showtime 7	Kazutaka Watanabe	Hiroshi Abe, Ryo Ryusei, Meru Nukumi, Haruka Igawa, Ryo Nishikido, Kōtarō Yoshida	
F E B R U A R Y	7	Hold Me Tighter Than Anyone	Eiji Uchida	Ryoki Miyama, Shiori Kubo, Hwang Chan-sung, Moeka Hoshi, Rin Nagata, Yukiya Kitamura, Misaki Kitajima, Yūna Takeshita, Yoshi Sakou	
F E B R U A R Y	8	Rain or Shine	Fuyushu Izuka	Yasuno Sumi, Suwa Juri, Uemura Yu, Kimura Tomotaka, Yamanaka Arata	
F E B R U A R Y	14	Trillion Game	Yoshiaki Murao	Ren Meguro, Hayato Sano, Mio Imada, Riko Fukumoto, Kōji Kikkawa	
F E B R U A R Y	14	Broken Rage	Takeshi Kitano	Takeshi Kitano, Tadanobu Asano, Nao Ōmori, Nakamura Shidō II, Gekidan Hitori, Hakuryu	
F E B R U A R Y	21	Yasuko, Songs of Days Past	Kichitaro Negishi	Suzu Hirose, Masaki Okada, Taisei Kido, Shunsuke Tanaka, Tortoise Matsumoto, Kumi Takiuchi, Tamiyo Kusakari, Shinsuke Kato, Sawako Fujima, Tasuku Emoto	
F E B R U A R Y	21	Boy's Wish: We Can Use Magic Once in a Lifetime	Masato Kimura	Yusei Yagi, Yuki Inoue, Kaito Sakurai, Taiga Tsubaki, Seiichi Tanabe, Takashi Sasano, Cunning Takeyama	
F E B R U A R Y	21	The Man Who Failed to Die	Seiji Tanaka	Katamari Mizukawa, Bokuzō Masana, Erika Karata, Yutaka Kyan, Miona Hori, Ryu Morioka	
F E B R U A R Y	21	Kanasando	Toshiyuki Teruya	Ruka Matsuda, Keiko Horiuchi, Tadanobu Asano, Mayumi Ueda, K Jersey	
F E B R U A R Y	21	Ultraman Arc The Movie: The Clash of Light and Evil	Takanori Tsujimoto	Yuki Totsuka, Sho Kaneta, Kaho Mizutani, Koichiro Nishi, Shoki Nakayama, Hinako Tanaka	
F E B R U A R Y	21	Kamen Rider Gotchard: Graduations	Kyohei Yamaguchi	Junsei Motojima, Reiyo Matsumoto, Yasunari Fujibayashi, Oto Abe, Rikiya Tomizono, Rikuto Kumaki, Amon Kabe, Saki Fukuda	
F E B R U A R Y	21	Yoasobi 5th Anniversary Dome Live 2024 "Surrealism"	Junichi Hirayama	Ayase, Ikura	
F E B R U A R Y	27	Demon City	Seiji Tanaka	Toma Ikuta, Onoe Matsuya II, Masahiro Higashide, Masanobu Takashima, Miou Tanaka, Ami Touma, Taro Suruga, Mai Kiryū, Naoto Takenaka, Takuma Otoo	
F E B R U A R Y	28	My Beloved Stranger	Takahiro Miki	Kento Nakajima, Milet, Kenta Kiritani, Hidekazu Mashima, Yurika Nakamura, Wan Marui, Norito Yashima, Jun Fubuki	
F E B R U A R Y	28	Shinran: The Purpose of Life	Hiroshi Aoyama	Ryōtarō Sugi, Takahiro Sakurai, Hiroshi Naka	
F E B R U A R Y	28	Requiem	Yugo Kanno	Yūta Hiraoka, Reika Sakurai, Kentarfo Yasui, Keichan, Masaya Kato	
M A R C H	7	The 35-Year Promise	Renpei Tsukamoto	Shōfukutei Tsurube II, Tomoyo Harada, Daiki Shigeoka, Mone Kamishiraishi	
M A R C H	7	Doraemon: Nobita's Art World Tales	Yukiyo Teramoto	Wasabi Mizuta, Megumi Ōhara, Yumi Kakazu, Subaru Kimura, Tomokazu Seki	
M A R C H	7	It Takes More Than a Pretty Face to Fall in Love	Saiji Yakumo	Ryubi Miyase, Rinka Kumada, Sota Nakajima, Reia Yonekura	
M A R C H	7	I Live in Fear	Jun'ichi Inoue	Masatoshi Nagase, Kanako Mizumoto	
M A R C H	14	Mononoke the Movie: The Ashes of Rage	Kiyotaka Suzuki	Hiroshi Kamiya, Haruka Tomatsu, Yoko Hikasa, Yuki Kaji, Daisuke Hosomi, Tomoyo Kurosawa, Chō, Kenyu Horiuchi	
M A R C H	14	A Girl & Her Guard Dog	Keiichi Kobayashi	Riko Fukumoto, Jesse, Kaito Sakurai, Tetta Sugimoto, Kisuke Iida, Nozomi Sasaki, Kanon, Haruna Matsui, Gunpee	
M A R C H	14	Ravens	Mark Gill	Tadanobu Asano, Kumi Takiuchi, Kanji Furutachi, Sosuke Ikematsu, Saki Takaoka	
M A R C H	14	Step Out	Yukihiko Tsutsumi	Yukie Nakama, Soul, Ren Matayoshi, Reiri Iha, Ruka Matsuda, Masane Tsukayama, Kenchi Tachibana	
M A R C H	14	As for Me	Hitoshi Yazaki	Ai Hashimoto, Taishi Nakagawa, Anna Yamada, Asami Usuda, Aoi Nakamura	
M A R C H	15	The Escape	Masao Adachi	Kanji Furutachi, Rairu Sugita, Soran Tamoto, Eriko Nakamura	
M A R C H	15	Perfect Shared House	Ami Sakurai	Arisa Sasaki, Tatsuomi Hamada, Amon Hirai, Sayoko Oho, Kanji Tsuda	
M A R C H	20	True Beauty: Before	Kazunari Hoshino	Kōki, Keisuke Watanabe, Keito Tsuna, Yūka Sugai, Emi Suzuki, Kenjiro Tsuda, Shinya Owada, Jiro Sato	
M A R C H	20	A Bad Summer	Hideo Jojo	Takumi Kitamura, Yuumi Kawai, Marika Itō, Katsuya Maiguma, Yumena Yanai, Pistol Takehara, Haruka Kinami, Masataka Kubota	
M A R C H	20	The Boy and the Dog	Takahisa Zeze	Fumiya Takahashi, Nanase Nishino, Takumi Saitoh, Hitomi Miyauchi, Kentaro Ito, Rikka Ihara, Akira Emoto	
M A R C H	20	Nemurubaka: Hypnic Jerks	Yūgo Sakamoto	Shiori Kubo, Yuna Taira, Keito Tsuna, Kouhei Higuchi	
M A R C H	21	BAUS: The Ship's Voyage Continues	Sora Hokimoto	Shota Sometani, Kazunobu Mineta, Kaho, Maho Toyota, Ken Mitsuishi, Ai Hashimoto, Keiichi Suzuki	
M A R C H	22	River Returns	Masakazu Kaneko	Asuka Hanamura, Yo Aoi, Sanetoshi Ariyama, Ken Yasuda	
M A R C H	28	My Love Story with Yamada-kun at Lv999	Yuka Yasukawa	Ryuto Sakuma, Mizuki Yamashita, Noa, Rui Tsukishima, Mogura Suzuki, Mahiru Coda, Mizuki Kayashima, Oshiro Maeda	
M A R C H	29	Bold as You	Takashi Okamoto	Kaori Ijuin, Mariko Gotō, Kanji Tsuda, Toshiki Hata	

=== April – June ===
Opening		Title	Director	Cast	Ref.
A P R I L	1	V. Maria	Daisuke Miyazaki	Hina Kikuchi, Masataka Fujishige, Sahel Rosa	
A P R I L	4	Taste and Tears	Hatsuki Yoko'o	Kento Nagao, Ami Touma, Rintaro Mizusawa, Haruka Imou, Ryo Ikeda, Machiko Ono, Rie Mimura, Ken Yasuda, Dean Fujioka	
A P R I L	4	Unreachable	Nobuhiro Doi	Suzu Hirose, Hana Sugisaki, Kaya Kiyohara, Ryusei Yokohama, Kuu Izima, Naomi Nishida	
A P R I L	4	Seppuku: The Sun Goes Down	Yuji Kakizaki	Yuka Takeshima, Masayuki Deai, Yasuyuki Maekawa, Ema Fujisawa, Masaya Kikawada, Toshiya Sakai, Yuichi Haba, Hiroaki Murakami	
A P R I L	4	Let's Meet at Angie's Bar	Yurugu Matsumoto	Mitsuko Kusabue, Akira Terao, Yoko Matsuda, Yuzu Aoki, Taketo Tanaka, Hikari Ishida, Dean Fujioka	
A P R I L	11	Ghost Killer	Kensuke Sonomura	Akari Takaishi, Mario Kuroba, Masanori Mimoto, Sora Inoue, Ayaka Higashino	
A P R I L	18	Me & Roboco: The Movie	Akitaro Daichi	Shun Matsuo, Minami Tsuda, Ryōtarō Okiayu, Shunsuke Takeuchi, Mao Ichimichi, Sae Hiratsuka	
A P R I L	18	Detective Conan: One-eyed Flashback	Katsuya Shigehara	Minami Takayama, Wakana Yamazaki, Rikiya Koyama, Yūji Takada, Show Hayami, Ami Koshimizu	
A P R I L	23	Bullet Train Explosion	Shinji Higuchi	Tsuyoshi Kusanagi, Kanata Hosoda, Non, Jun Kaname, Machiko Ono, Hana Toyoshima, Takumi Saitoh	
A P R I L	25	#Iwilltellyouthetruth	Keisuke Toyoshima	Motoki Ohmori, Fuma Kikuchi, Ayami Nakajo, Amane Okayama, Riko Fukumoto, Yuki Sakurai, Takashi Yamanaka, Sayaka Akimoto, Yosuke Omizu, Hideaki Ito	
A P R I L	25	Ya Boy Kongming! The Movie	Shuhei Shibue	Osamu Mukai, Moka Kamishiraishi, Fūju Kamio, Utaha, Dean Fujioka, Mirai Moriyama	
A P R I L	25	Petals and Memories	Tetsu Maeda	Ryohei Suzuki, Kasumi Arimura, Ouji Suzuka, First Summer Uika, Yoshi Sakou, Seiji Rokkaku, Midoriko Kimura	
A P R I L	25	She Taught Me Serendipity	Akiko Ōku	Riku Hagiwara, Yuumi Kawai, Aoi Ito, Kodai Kurosaki, Hajime Anzai, Kodai Asaka, Honoka Matsumoto, Arata Furuta	
M A Y	1	Dream Animals: The Movie	Hitoshi Takekiyo	Genta Matsuda, Koshi Mizukami, Akari Takaishi, Shingo Fujimori, Shouta Aoi, Ari Ozawa, Inori Minase, Nao Tōyama, Fumihiko Tachiki, Kurumi Mamiya	
M A Y	1	True Beauty: After	Kazunari Hoshino	Kōki, Keisuke Watanabe, Keito Tsuna, Yūka Sugai, Emi Suzuki, Kenjiro Tsuda, Shinya Owada, Jiro Sato	
M A Y	1	Bakuage Sentai Boonboomger vs. King-Ohger	Hiroyuki Kato	Haruhi Iuchi, Yuki Hayama, Miu Suzuki, Ryu Saito, Satoru Soma, Yu Miyazawa, Taisei Sakai, Aoto Watanabe, Erica Murakami, Yuzuki Hirakawa, So Kaku	
M A Y	2	Mission: Sorta Possible	Tōichirō Rutō	Daiki Shigeoka, Akito Kiriyama, Junta Nakama, Tomohiro Kamiyama, Ryusei Fujii, Takahiro Hamada, Nozomu Kotaki, Yuri Tsunematsu	
M A Y	2	The Killer Goldfish	Yukihiko Tsutsumi	Erika Oka, Yoshinari Takahashi, Yōsuke Kubozuka, Jiro Sato	
M A Y	2	The Lonely Six	Dai Munetsuna	Kouta Nomura, Haruto Yoshida, Ui Mihara, Jun Matsuo, Miu Suzuki, Hinano Nakayama	
M A Y	10	Unfounded	Hiroaki Yanagi	Yoshimasa Kondo, Takehiro Murata, Marin Azuma	
M A Y	16	Blank Canvas: My So-Called Artist's Journey	Kazuaki Seki	Mei Nagano, Yo Oizumi, Ai Mikami, Mei Hata, Jin Suzuki, Fūju Kamio, Kenjiro Tsuda, Teppei Arita, Megumi, Nao Ōmori	
M A Y	16	Kaneko's Commissary	Gō Furukawa	Ryuhei Maruyama, Yōko Maki, Kira Miura, Mana Kawaguchi, Takumi Kitamura, Eri Murakawa, Yūko Natori, Akira Terao	
M A Y	16	Jinsei	Ryuya Suzuki	Ace Cool, Taketo Tanaka, Shohei Uno, Ayumu Nakajima, Katsuya Maiguma, Miho Ohashi, Kanji Tsuda	
M A Y	23	Unforgettable	Norihiro Koizumi	Akira Terao, Tori Matsuzaka, Shiori Sato, Jun Soejima, Miyuki Oshima, Asuka Saitō, Yūji Miyake, Saburo Ishikura, Dean Fujioka, Kōichi Satō, Keiko Matsuzaka	
M A Y	23	Thus Spoke Rohan Kishibe: At a Confessional	Kazutaka Watanabe	Issey Takahashi, Marie Iitoyo, Tina Tamashiro, Shigeyuki Totsugi, Shunsuke Daito, Andrea Bellacicco, Arata Iura	
M A Y	23	Godmother: The Life of Ayako Koshino	Takeshi Sone	Mao Daichi, Tomoka Kurotani, Sawa Suzuki, Kyoka Minakami	
M A Y	23	Princess Principal: Crown Handler – Chapter 4	Masaki Tachibana	Aoi Koga, Akira Sekine, Yō Taichi, Akari Kageyama, Nozomi Furuki	
M A Y	30	Bad Boys	Tatsuro Nishikawa	Issei Mamehara, Rihito Ikezaki, Jyutaro Yamanaka, Sora Inoue	
M A Y	30	I Have a S/e/c/r/e/t/	Shun Nakagawa	Daiken Okudaira, Natsuki Deguchi, Masaya Sano, Hinako Kikuchi, Ikoi Hayase, Hiccorohee	
M A Y	30	Not Beer	Hirotaka Nakagawa	Yuki Tamaki, Satoru Soma, Miru Nagase, Keitoku Ito, Sanae Kaneko	
J U N E	6	Kokuho	Lee Sang-il	Ryo Yoshizawa, Ryusei Yokohama, Mitsuki Takahata, Nana Mori, Ai Mikami, Sōya Kurokawa, Keitatsu Koshiyama, Emma Miyazawa, Takahiro Miura, Kyusaku Shimada, Masatoshi Nagase, Shinobu Terajima, Nakamura Ganjirō IV, Min Tanaka, Ken Watanabe	
J U N E	6	The Girl Who Sees	Yoshihiro Nakamura	Nanoka Hara, Rinka Kumada, Naenano, Co-ki Yamashita, Akane Hotta, Saki Takaoka, Taiga Kyomoto, Kenichi Takitō	
J U N E	6	Strangers in Kyoto	Masanori Tominaga	Mai Fukagawa, Zuru Onodera, Reiko Kataoka, Ritsu Otomo, Ryuya Wakaba, Takashi Matsuo, Kōsuke Toyohara, Shigeru Muroi	
J U N E	6	Isolated	Hiroyuki Tsuji	Yoshiyuki Yamaguchi, Ryo Tajima, Kenta Kawasaki, Satoshi Jimbo, Yasukaze Motomiya	
J U N E	13	Dollhouse	Shinobu Yaguchi	Masami Nagasawa, Kōji Seto, Tetsushi Tanaka, Aoi Ikemura, Totoka Honda, Ken Yasuda, Jun Fubuki	
J U N E	13	Re: Kisaragi Station	Jiro Nagae	Miyu Honda, Yuri Tsunematsu, Nanami Taki, Eriko Sato, Megumi Okina	
J U N E	13	Frontline: Yokohama Bay	Kosai Sekine	Shun Oguri, Tori Matsuzaka, Sosuke Ikematsu, Nana Mori, Yuki Sakurai, Rie Mimura, Mitsuru Fukikoshi, Ken Mitsuishi, Kenichi Takitō, Yōsuke Kubozuka	
J U N E	13	Junk World	Takahide Hori	Takahide Hori	
J U N E	13	Rewrite	Daigo Matsui	Elaiza Ikeda, Kei Adachi, Sayu Kubota, Yuki Kura, Oshiro Maeda, Kasumi Yamaya, Reika Ozeki, Kokoro Morita, Akari Fukunaga, Ai Hashimoto	
J U N E	13	Seishun Gestalt Houkai	Hironori Kujiraoka	Arata Sato, Miho Watanabe, Momoko Tanabe, Miu Arai, Kenji Mizuhashi, Tatsuomi Hamada, Kodai Fujimoto, Naho Toda, Asaka Seto	
J U N E	20	My Special One	Ayato Matsuda	Mei Hata, Kazuya Ohashi, Keito Kimura, Jyutaro Yamanaka, Haru Okubo, Naoya, Nako Yabuki, Taiki Sato	
J U N E	20	Fake Out	Kei Horie	Ryota Miura, Nana Asakawa, Toshihiro Yashiba, Hidetoshi Kubota, Shun Sugata	
J U N E	20	Renoir	Chie Hayakawa	Yui Suzuki, Hikari Ishida, Ayumu Nakajima, Yuumi Kawai, Ryota Bando, Lily Franky	
J U N E	20	Principal Examination	Dai Sakō	Kiyohiko Shibukawa, Shiho Takano, Umi Kisaki, Shu Watanabe, Tsutomu Takahashi, Morio Kazama, Eri Ishida	
J U N E	27	Anpanman: Chapon's Hero!	Toshikazu Hashimoto	Keiko Toda, Ryūsei Nakao, Yu Aoi, Satoshi Mukai, Takahiro Ogata, Ryōtarō Kan, Shizuyo Yamasaki, Miina Tominaga, Aya Hirano, Koichi Yamadera	
J U N E	27	Sham	Takashi Miike	Go Ayano, Ko Shibasaki, Kazuya Kamenashi, Kōji Ōkura, Takaya Sakoda, Fumino Kimura, Ken Mitsuishi, Kazuki Kitamura, Kaoru Kobayashi	
J U N E	27	Lupin the IIIrd the Movie: The Immortal Bloodline	Takeshi Koike	Kanichi Kurita, Akio Otsuka, Daisuke Namikawa, Miyuki Sawashiro, Koichi Yamadera, Sumi Shimamoto, Minami Takayama, Miyuki Kobori, Aoi Morikawa, Kataoka Ainosuke VI	
J U N E	27	July 5, 2025, 4:18 AM	Hiroaki Furukawa	Yui Oguri, Tetsu Funagayama, Ayu Okuma, Reika Ozeki	
J U N E	27	Young and Fine	Toshiya Kominami	Taisuke Niihara, Yuka Kouri, Yuki Araho	
J U N E	27	Virgin Punk: Clockwork Girl	Yasuomi Umetsu	Saki Miyashita, Katsuyuki Konishi, Taku Yashiro, Rui Tanabe, Norio Wakamoto, Fūka Izumi, Sumire Uesaka	
J U N E	27	Miss Kobayashi's Dragon Maid: A Lonely Dragon Wants to Be Loved	Tatsuya Ishihara	Mutsumi Tamura, Yūki Kuwahara, Maria Naganawa, Yūki Takada, Minami Takahashi, Daisuke Ono, Yuichi Nakamura, Emiri Katō, Kaori Ishihara, Fumihiko Tachiki, Nobunaga Shimazaki, Shiori Sugiura	

=== July – September ===
Opening		Title	Director	Cast	Ref.
J U L Y	4	I Am Kirishima	Banmei Takahashi	Katsuya Maiguma, Eita Okuno, Kana Kita, Keiko Takahashi	
J U L Y	4	Candle Stick	Gota Yonekura	Hiroshi Abe, Nanao, Sahel Rosa, Kenjiro Tsuda, Young Dais, Alyssa Chia, Austin Lin	
J U L Y	4	On Summer Sand	Shin'ya Tamada	Joe Odagiri, Akari Takaishi, Takako Matsu, Naotarō Moriyama, Fumiya Takahashi, Yukiko Shinohara, Hikari Mitsushima, Ken Mitsuishi	
J U L Y	4	Love Doesn't Matter to Me	Aya Igashi	Sara Minami, Fumika Baba, Miyu Honda, Shunsuke Motoi, Kuu Izima, Shoko Ikezu, Aoba Kawai	
J U L Y	4	Catching the Stars of This Summer	Kan Yamamoto	Hiyori Sakurada, Rintaro Mizusawa, Sōya Kurokawa, Arisa Nakano, Ikoi Hayase, Anna Hoshino, Hana Kawamura, Iori Wada, Mamoru Hagiwara, Ikuho Akiya, Coco Masui, Kono Adachi, Shun Aoi, Takashi Okabe	
J U L Y	4	Who Cares?: The Movie	Takashi Ninomiya	Taizo Harada, Sota Nakajima, Kairi Jo, Azusa Ohara, Keisuke Higashi, Yuki Matsushita, Yasuko Tomita	
J U L Y	4	Babanba Banban Vampire	Shinji Hamasaki	Ryo Yoshizawa, Rihito Itagaki, Nanoka Hara, Shinnosuke Mitsushima, Mandy Sekiguchi, Kurara Emi, Takashi Sasano, Takuma Otoo, Shinichi Tsutsumi, Gordon Maeda	
J U L Y	11	Fiamma	Eiji Uchida	Yukiya Kitamura, Wan Marui, Udai Iwasaki, Reiko Kataoka, Momoi Shimada	
J U L Y	11	Haramu Hitobito	Shunsuke Nakajima	Yukimi Souma, Kaho Seto, Kodai Asaka, Mizuki Maehara, Maki Isonishi	
J U L Y	18	Demon Slayer: Kimetsu no Yaiba – The Movie: Infinity Castle	Haruo Sotozaki	Natsuki Hanae, Akari Kitō, Hiro Shimono, Yoshitsugu Matsuoka, Reina Ueda, Nobuhiko Okamoto, Takahiro Sakurai, Katsuyuki Konishi, Kengo Kawanishi, Saori Hayami, Kana Hanazawa, Kenichi Suzumura, Tomokazu Seki, Tomokazu Sugita, Yoshimasa Hosoya, Mamoru Miyano, Akira Ishida	
J U L Y	18	49 nichi no Shinjitsu	Yuji Nakamae	Nana Asakawa, Momoko Tanabe, Nao Hoshino, Ami Tomite, Mitsuki Kimijima, Riho Takada	
J U L Y	25	Army on the Tree	Kazuhiro Taira	Shinichi Tsutsumi, Yuki Yamada, Ryuto Tsuha, Keiji Tamayose, Shogen, Masayoshi Kishimoto, Yayoi Shiroma, Hiroki Kawata, Atsushi Yamanishi	
J U L Y	25	Stigmatized Properties: Possession	Hideo Nakata	Shota Watanabe, Mei Hata, Maho Yamada, Jiro, Ryō Katō, Bokuzō Masana, Kenichi Takitō, Kōtarō Yoshida	
J U L Y	25	Breathing Underwater	Shoji Yasui	Ruka Ishikawa, Runa Nakasima, Moe Kurata, Yuka Sasaki, Rin Matsumiya, Kurodo Hachijoin, Harumi Shuhama	
J U L Y	25	Kamen Rider Gavv: Invaders of the House of Snacks	Teruaki Sugihara	Hidekazu Chinen, Yusuke Hino, Nozome Miyabi, Kohei Shoji, Honoka Kawasaki, Ruito Koga, Ryo Takizawa, Machi Chitose, Takashi Tsukamoto, Kazuki Kyan, Hiroki Shimowada, Kurumi Madoka, Kouki Sakurai, Ayu Shoji	
J U L Y	25	No.1 Sentai Gozyuger: TegaSword of Resurrection	Ryuta Tazaki	Mio Fuyuno, Hideharu Suzuki, Masakazu Kanda, Maya Imamori, Kaiki Kimura, Yuki Kaji, KENN, Noriko Nakagoshi, Daisuke Sanbongi, Marupi, Karuma, Tomokazu Sugita, Reina Ueda, Wataru Komada	
J U L Y	26	Watashi no Mita Sekai	Eri Ishida	Eri Ishida, Yoko Oshima, Shirō Sano	
A U G U S T	1	Tokyo MER: Mobile Emergency Room – Nankai Mission	Aya Matsuki	Ryohei Suzuki, Kento Kaku, Mahiro Takasugi, Meru Nukumi, Nanao, Yōsuke Eguchi, Tetsuji Tamayama, Emma Miyazawa, Shingo Tsurumi, Yuriko Ishida	
A U G U S T	1	Nagasaki: In the Shadow of the Flash	Junpei Matsumoto	Hinako Kikuchi, Karin Ono, Asuka Kawatoko, Ayame Misaki, Dai Watanabe, Taketo Tanaka, Shūichi Ikeda, Fujie Yamashita, Kaho Minami, Akihiro Miwa	
A U G U S T	1	Ikigake no Sora	Shin'ichi Nishitani	Takahiro Miura, Misaki Hattori, Nahana	
A U G U S T	8	Crayon Shin-chan the Movie: Super Hot! The Spicy Kasukabe Dancers	Masakazu Hashimoto	Yumiko Kobayashi, Kento Kaku, Eiji Kotoge, Mizuki Nishimura, Asami Seto, Koichi Yamadera, Show Hayami, Noriko Hidaka, Katsuhisa Hōki, Chika Sakamoto	
A U G U S T	8	Kinki	Kōji Shiraishi	Miho Kanno, Eiji Akaso	
A U G U S T	15	Yukikaze	Toshihisa Yamada	Yutaka Takenouchi, Hiroshi Tamaki, Daiken Okudaira, Ami Touma, Takahiro Fujimoto, Rena Tanaka, Kanji Ishimaru, Kiichi Nakai	
A U G U S T	15	ChaO	Yasuhiro Aoki	Ouji Suzuka, Anna Yamada, Kavka Shishido, Yūichirō Umehara, Kenta Miyake, Shunsei Ota, Anna Tsuchiya, Cookie!, Ryota Yamasato	
A U G U S T	22	As One	Kōbun Shizuno	Ruki Shiroiwa, Haruka Shiraishi, Shunsuke Takeuchi, Yoko Hikasa, Ryuhei Maruyama	
A U G U S T	22	The Tales of Kurashiki	Emiko Hiramatsu	Soma Santoki, Runa Nakashima, Megumi, Tomoya Maeno, Daisuke Takahashi, Hayashiya Shōzō IX, Isao Hashizume	
A U G U S T	22	Eiga Odekake Kozame Tokai no Otomodachi	Chihiro Kumano	Kana Hanazawa, Megumi Han, Misaki Kuno	
A U G U S T	22	Stella Next to Me	Hana Matsumoto	Riko Fukumoto, Yusei Yagi, Yuki Kura, Mayuu Yokota, Sho Nishigaki, Ririka Tanabe	
A U G U S T	22	Taroman Expo Explosion	Ryo Fujii	Ichiro Yamaguchi	
A U G U S T	29	Dive in Wonderland	Toshiya Shinohara	Nanoka Hara, Maika Pugh, Koji Yamamoto, Norito Yashima, Ryuichi Kosugi, Kappei Yamaguchi, Toshiyuki Morikawa, Takahiro Yamamoto, Mayu Matsuoka, Shotaro Mamiya, Keiko Toda	
A U G U S T	29	Exit 8	Genki Kawamura	Kazunari Ninomiya, Yamato Kochi, Naru Asanuma, Kotone Hanase, Nana Komatsu	
A U G U S T	29	Seaside Serendipity	Satoko Yokohama	Konosuke Harada, Kumiko Aso, Kengo Kora, Erika Karata, Ayame Goriki, Koharu Sugawara, Maki Sakai	
A U G U S T	29	Kowloon Generic Romance	Chihiro Ikeda	Riho Yoshioka, Koshi Mizukami, Ryo Ryusei, Shunatro Yanagi, Minami Umezawa, Kotone Hanase, Figaro Tseng	
S E P T E M B E R	5	A Pale View of Hills	Kei Ishikawa	Suzu Hirose, Fumi Nikaido, Yō Yoshida, Camilla Aiko, Rie Shibata, Daichi Watanabe, Mio Suzuki, Kouhei Matsushita, Tomokazu Miura	
S E P T E M B E R	5	Re/Member: The Last Night	Eiichirō Hasumi	Kanna Hashimoto, Gordon Maeda, Kaito Sakurai, Seira Anzai, Fuku Suzuki, Marin Honda, Takeaki Yoshida, Yoshino Kimura	
S E P T E M B E R	5	How Dare You?	Mipo O	Tetta Shimada, Ruri, Yota Mimoto, Kumi Takiuchi, Shunsuke Kazama, Yū Aoi	
S E P T E M B E R	12	Black Showman	Akira Tanaka	Masaharu Fukuyama, Kasumi Arimura, Ryo Narita, Tōru Nakamura, Erika Ikuta, Win Morisaki, Katsuhisa Namase, Sae Okazaki, Atsuhiro Inukai, Atsushi Itō, Subaru Kimura, Yuki Morinaga, Hiroki Akiyama	
S E P T E M B E R	12	Beethoven Fabrication	Kazuaki Seki	Yuki Yamada, Arata Furuta, Shota Sometani, Fūju Kamio, Oshiro Maeda, Yukiyoshi Ozawa, Katsuhisa Namase, Shinya Kote, Toru Nomaguchi, Kenichi Endō	
S E P T E M B E R	12	Purehearted	Kaoru Haga	Sairi Ito, Shota Sometani, Shogen, Kavka Shishido, Ichiro Hashimoto, Zuru Onoderam, Nakachi, Moto Shimoji, Hiroki Kawata, Hidekazu Mashima, Katsuhiro Higo, Kenichi Takitō, Yasuko Tomita, Atsuko Takahata	
S E P T E M B E R	12	Dear Stranger	Tetsuya Mariko	Hidetoshi Nishijima, Gwei Lun-mei, Julian Wang	
S E P T E M B E R	13	There Was Such a Thing Before	Yoshihiko Matsui	Oshiro Maeda, Airu Kubozuka, Arata Iura, Shuji Kashiwabara	
S E P T E M B E R	13	Senseki	Lukas Machac Baba	Taka Takao, Ikue Sakakibara, Nene Mori, Rintaro Ikeda, Atsuko Hikage, Ako Tomizawa	
S E P T E M B E R	19	Hero's Island	Keishi Ōtomo	Satoshi Tsumabuki, Suzu Hirose, Masataka Kubota, Shinya Tsukamoto, Aoi Nakamura, Kumi Takiuchi, Eriya, Shogen, Pierre Taki, Ryu Kohara, Eita Okuno, Hideaki Murata, Derrick Dover, Eita Nagayama	
S E P T E M B E R	19	Chainsaw Man – The Movie: Reze Arc	Tatsuya Yoshihara	Kikunosuke Toya, Reina Ueda, Shiori Izawa, Tomori Kusunoki, Shogo Sakata, Fairouz Ai, Karin Takahashi, Natsuki Hanae, Yūya Uchida, Maaya Uchida	
S E P T E M B E R	19	100 Meters	Kenji Iwaisawa	Tori Matsuzaka, Shota Sometani, Koki Uchiyama, Kenjiro Tsuda	
S E P T E M B E R	19	The Hungry God	Masaki Inoue	Yuya Endo, Sho Ayanagi, Genki Iwahashi, Akari Suda, Shinsuke Kato, Ouga Tsukao, Ayako Sawada, Masaya Kato	
S E P T E M B E R	26	The Silent Service: Battle of the Arctic Ocean	Kōhei Yoshino	Takao Osawa, Aya Ueto, Kenjiro Tsuda, Aoi Nakamura, Takashi Sasano, Yui Natsukawa, Yoshi Sakou, Kou Maehara, Koudai Matsuoka, Jun Fubuki, Yōsuke Eguchi	
S E P T E M B E R	26	Not Me That Went Viral	Atsuhiro Yamada	Hiroshi Abe, Mana Ashida, Taiyu Fujiwara, Kento Nagao, Hiroki Miyake, Atsushi Hashimoto, Toshiyuki Itakura, Kenta Hamano, Jun Miho, Reiko Tajima, Yui Natsukawa	

=== October – December ===
Opening		Title	Director	Cast	Ref.
O C T O B E R	3	The Bird Is Calling	Katsuhide Motoki	Koshi Mizukami, Mizuki Yamashita, Ryota Miyadate, Misato Morita, Yudai Toyoda, Yumi Asō, Ken Yoshizawa	
O C T O B E R	3	After the Quake	Tsuyoshi Inoue	Masaki Okada, Yui Narumi, Daichi Watanabe, Kōichi Satō, Ai Hashimoto, Erika Karata, Mitsuru Fukikoshi, Rena Nōnen, Shinichi Tsutsumi	
O C T O B E R	3	By 6 A.M.	Munetoshi Mukai	Rina Takeda, Taro Suruga, Masato Hagiwara, Chie Tsuji, Kinari Hirano, Rin Marumoto, Masaya Kato	
O C T O B E R	10	5 Centimeters per Second	Yoshiyuki Okuyama	Hokuto Matsumura, Mitsuki Takahata, Nana Mori, Yuzu Aoki, Mai Kiryu, Haruto Ueda, Noa Shiroyama, Aoi Miyazaki, Hidetaka Yoshioka	
O C T O B E R	10	The Last Blossom	Baku Kinoshita	Kaoru Kobayashi, Junki Tozuka, Hikari Mitsushima, Yoshiko Miyazaki, Pierre Taki	
O C T O B E R	10	Brand New Landscape	Yuiga Danzuka	Kodai Kurosaki, Kenichi Endō, Haruka Igawa, Mai Kiryu, Akiko Kikuchi, Aoi Nakamura, Misaki Hattori	
O C T O B E R	17	Strawberry Moon	Mai Sakai	Ami Touma, Jun Saitō, Yosuke Sugino, Ayami Nakajo, Anji Ikehata, Kodai Kurosaki, Kaname Yoshizawa, Kentaro Ito, Yūki Izumisawa, Shoko Ikezu, Jun Hashimoto, Rena Tanaka, Yūsuke Santamaria	
O C T O B E R	17	Hokusai's Daughter	Tatsushi Ōmori	Masami Nagasawa, Masatoshi Nagase, Kaito Takahashi, Ryohei Otani, Eisuke Sasai, Eita Okuno, Shinobu Terajima	
O C T O B E R	24	Baka's Identity	Koto Nagata	Takumi Kitamura, Yuta Hayashi, Mizuki Yamashita, Yūma Yamoto, Haruka Kinami, Go Ayano	
O C T O B E R	24	The Sickness Unto Love	Ryūichi Hiroki	Kento Nagao, Anna Yamada, Kotaro Daigo, Tomo Nakai, Tsubasa Nakagawa, Amane Uehara, Momoko Kobayashi, Ayaka Imoto, Takeyuki Mayumi, Shugo Oshinari, Aoba Kawai, Atsuko Maeda	
O C T O B E R	24	Meets the World	Daigo Matsui	Hana Sugisaki, Kotona Minami, Rihito Itagaki, Kuruma Takahira, Kanta Sato, Kiyohiko Shibukawa, Mariko Tsutsui, Yū Aoi	
O C T O B E R	24	Mt. Fuji and Happiness Code	Kenji Nakanishi	Issei Mamehara, Yoshie Ichige, Miki Sakai, Rikako Yagi, Ichikawa Emisaburo III, Ayuta Fukuda, Ray Fujita, Kyōzō Nagatsuka	
O C T O B E R	24	Becoming the Sea	Masato Oki	Takahiro Miura, Kouhei Takeda, Miyu Sakihi	
O C T O B E R	24	School Meals Time: School Excursion Inferno	Shin'ya Ayabe	Hayato Ichihara, Rena Takeda, Taiki Tazawa, Eishin, Jin Katagiri, Maiko Itō, Miyoko Akaza, Naomasa Musaka, Atsuko Takahata, Kazuki Kosakai	
O C T O B E R	24	Good Luck	Shin Adachi	Hiroki Sano, Hana Amano, Saki Kato, Ryo Shinoda, Ayame Goriki, Yuka Itaya	
O C T O B E R	31	The Final Piece	Naoto Kumazawa	Kentaro Sakaguchi, Ken Watanabe, Kuranosuke Sasaki, Tao Tsuchiya, Mahiro Takasugi, Takuma Otoo, Ikkei Watanabe, Onoe Ukon II, Tae Kimura, Fumiyo Kohinata, Akira Emoto	
O C T O B E R	31	Love Song	Weerachit Thongjila	Win Morisaki, Koji Mukai, Phiravich Attachitsataporn, Taiyu Fujiwara, Kyōko Saitō, Chalongrat Novsamrong, Music, Ryota Moisture, Mariko Tsutsui, Mitsuhiro Oikawa	
O C T O B E R	31	Suzuki=Bakudan	Akira Nagai	Yuki Yamada, Jiro Sato, Sairi Ito, Shota Sometani, Ryota Bando, Kanichiro, Atsuro Watabe	
O C T O B E R	31	Climbing for Life	Junji Sakamoto	Sayuri Yoshinaga, Kōichi Satō, Yūki Amami, Rena Nōnen, Fumino Kimura, Ryuya Wakaba, Asuka Kudo, Mizuki Kayashima	
O C T O B E R	31	Flames of a Flower	Oudai Kojima	Ikken Yamamoto, Yurina Yanagi, Yōhei Matsukado, Ippei Tanaka, Masatō Ibu	
N O V E M B E R	7	Two Seasons, Two Strangers	Sho Miyake	Shim Eun-kyung, Shinichi Tsutsumi, Yuumi Kawai, Mansaku Takada	
N O V E M B E R	7	The Obsessed	Wataru Takahashi	Masaya Sano, Moka Kamishiraishi, Hayato Kakizawa, Takahiro Yamamoto, Shinji Kawada, Nana Mizuki, Toshiyuki Morikawa	
N O V E M B E R	14	A Light in the Harbor	Michihito Fujii	Hiroshi Tachi, Gordon Maeda, Mahoro Onoe, Yuina Kuroshima, Takumi Saitoh, Pierre Taki, Wataru Ichinose, Megumi, Masaaki Akahori, Ryudo Uzaki, Takashi Sasano, Masachika Ichimura, Kippei Shiina	
N O V E M B E R	14	A Moon in the Ordinary	Nobuhiro Doi	Masato Sakai, Haruka Igawa, Manato Sakamoto, Kasumi Isshiki, Yuri Nakamura, Denden, Michiko Kichise, Tamnae Ando, Oniyakko Tsubaki, Shuntaro Yanagi, Yuki Kura, Ryo Narita, Sansei Shiomi, Nao Ōmori	
N O V E M B E R	14	Blue Boy Trial	Kasho Iizuka	Miyu Nakagawa, Kou Maehara, Ataru Nakamura, Izumi Sezy, Kiyohiko Shibukawa, Takashi Yamanaka, Junpei Yasui, Ryo Nishikido	
N O V E M B E R	14	Can't Cry with Your Face	Yuichiro Sakashita	Kyoko Yoshine, Kaito Takahashi, Airi Nishikawa, Nao Takeichi, Motoki Nakazawa, Kou Maehara, Yuta Hayashi, Nene Otsuka, Masaaki Akahori, Reiko Kataoka, Takashi Yamanaka	
N O V E M B E R	21	Tokyo Taxi	Yoji Yamada	Chieko Baisho, Takuya Kimura, Yū Aoi, Takaya Sakoda, Yūka, Runa Nakashima, Misuzu Kanno, Lee Jun-young, Takashi Sasano	
N O V E M B E R	21	Scarlet	Mamoru Hosoda	Mana Ashida, Masaki Okada, Kazuhiro Yamaji, Tokio Emoto, Munetaka Aoki, Shota Sometani, Noa Shiroyama, Kayoko Shiraishi, Kōtarō Yoshida, Yuki Saito, Yutaka Matsushige, Masachika Ichimura, Koji Yakusho	
N O V E M B E R	21	Blonde	Yuichiro Sakashita	Takanori Iwata, Tamaki Shiratori, Mugi Kadowaki, Maho Yamada, Kentaro Tamura, Chika Uchida	
N O V E M B E R	21	Ice on the Moon	Akinori Dono	Tsubasa Imai, Sumire, Mao Miyaji, Yoshimasa Kondo	
N O V E M B E R	22	Michikusa Kitchen	Mitsuhito Shiraha	Yuri Nakae, Hiroto Kanai, Chika Araki, Honoka Murakami, Yoko Kon, Masaji Otsuka	
N O V E M B E R	22	Dawn Chorus	Yoshinori Sato	Mariko Tsutsui, Mansaku Takada, Yukihiro Nishiyama, Chikara Tokunaga, Miko Nakazaawa, Yuki Yoshigai, Riko, Shusaku Uchida, Noa Kawazoe	
N O V E M B E R	22	Silent Night	Ken'ichi Fujiwara	Shun Sugata, Yuuka Yano, Atsushi Arai, Sousuke Takaoka, Shigemitsu Ogi, Miyoko Yoshimoto, Tetsu Watanabe, Kohei Otomo	
N O V E M B E R	28	Bring Him Down to a Portable Size	Ryōta Nakano	Ko Shibasaki, Joe Odagiri, Hikari Mitsushima, Himeno Aoyama, Yota Mimoto, Eri Murakawa, Mansaku Fuwa, Mitsuru Fukikoshi	
N O V E M B E R	28	Night Flower	Eiji Uchida	Keiko Kitagawa, Misato Morita, Daisuke Sakuma, Ryuta Shibuya, Kiyohiko Shibukawa, Hiroyuki Ikeuchi, Rena Tanaka, Ken Mitsuishi	
N O V E M B E R	28	Sato and Sato	Chihiro Amano	Yukino Kishii, Hio Miyazawa, Sakura Fujiwara, Ryota Miura, Kentaro Tamura, Kou Maehara, Hiroshi Yamamoto, Akiko Yagi, Ayumu Nakajima, Nozomi Sasaki, Reiko Tajima, Bengal	
N O V E M B E R	28	Vanishing World	Makoto Kawamura	Aju Makita, Shuntaro Yanagi, Yuri Tsunematsu, Kousei Yuki, Kentaro Tomita, Naoya Shimizu, Ryo Matsuura, KanadeI wata, Takashi Yamanaka, Hidekazu Mashima, Reika Kirishima	
N O V E M B E R	28	The Deepest Space In Us	Yasutomo Chikuma	Momoko Fukuchi, Kanichiro, Ryutaro Nakagawa, Haruka Kodama, Aki Asakura, Mariko Tsutsui	
N O V E M B E R	28	One Last Throw	Jun Akiyama	Takaya Matsutani, Kyōka Suzuki, Kentaro Maeda, Rikka Ihara, Hirona Yamazaki, Takuya Kusakawa, Masato Hagiwara, Yusuke Kamiji, Arata Furuta, Masaya Kato, Kōichi Satō, Nao Ōmori, Akira Emoto, Katsunori Takahashi	
N O V E M B E R	28	S-Friends 3	Hideo Jojo	Aika Yukihira, Sho Aoyagi, Moemi Katayama, Toshio Matsumoto	
D E C E M B E R	5	Peleliu: Guernica of Paradise	Gorō Kuji	Rihito Itagaki, Tomoya Nakamura, Hirosato Amano, Yuta Fujii, Takamasa Mogi, Eiji Mikami	
D E C E M B E R	5	Wind Breaker	Kentaro Hagiwara	Koshi Mizukami, Taisei Kido, Keito Tsuna, Junon, Motoki Nakazawa, Shuhei Uesugi, Rikako Yagi, Co-ki Yamashita, Noritaka Hamao	
D E C E M B E R	12	Romantic Killer	Tsutomu Hanabusa	Moka Kamishiraishi, Kyohei Takahashi, Masaya Kimura, Sota Nakajima, Hikaru Takahashi, Shunsuke Ito, Juri Kosaka, Kasumi Mori, Riki Honda, Joichiro Fujiwara, Taiki Sato, Sho Yonashiro, Terunosuke Takezai	
D E C E M B E R	12	S-Friends 4	Hideo Jojo	Aika Yukihira, Sho Aoyagi, Moemi Katayama, Terunosuke Takezai, Kasumi Yamaya, Toshio Matsumoto	
D E C E M B E R	18	10Dance	Keishi Ōtomo	Ryoma Takeuchi, Keita Machida, Shiori Doi, Anna Ishii, Sin'ya Hamada, Oshiro Maeda, Nadiya Bychkova, Susie Trayling, Pasquale La Rocca	
D E C E M B E R	19	New Interpretation of the End of Edo Period	Yūichi Fukuda	Tsuyoshi Muro, Jiro Sato, Alice Hirose, Takanori Iwata, Yuma Yamoto, Shota Sometani, Ryo Katsuji, Yuki Kura, Mizuki Yamashita, Shinya Kote, Katsumi Takahashi, Kenichi Matsuyama, Kento Kaku, Atsuro Watabe, Takayuki Yamada	
D E C E M B E R	19	Kaede	Isao Yukisada	Sota Fukushi, Haruka Fukuhara, Hio Miyazawa, Anna Ishii, Kaito Miyachika	
D E C E M B E R	19	The Stars and Moon are Holes in the Sky	Haruhiko Arai	Go Ayano, Sakuya, Rena Tanaka, Tasuku Emoto, Junko Miyashita, Minamo, Akari Misaki	
D E C E M B E R	19	Hatsukoi Geinin	Taichiro Natsume	Yoshitaka Hara, Aika Sawaguchi, Yoichi Nukumizu, Maiko Kawakami, Atsuhiro Sato, Shinji Rokkaku	
D E C E M B E R	20	It's a Wonderful Life	Takafumi Ota	Shunsuke Kubozuka, Takemi Fujii, Ako Suizu, Tomoko Fujita, Misato Tanaka, Shirō Sano	
D E C E M B E R	24	The Last Man: The Movie – First Love	Shun'ichi Hirano	Masaharu Fukuyama, Yo Oizumi, Ren Nagase, Mio Imada, Rowoon, Rui Tsukishima, Kanichiro, Satoru Matsuo, Tomohiko Imai, Tomoya Oku, Rui Tsukishima, Tae Kimura, Yō Yoshida, Takaya Kamikawa, Rie Miyazawa	
D E C E M B E R	26	White Flowers and Fruits	Yukari Sakamoto	Miro, Anji Ikehata, Nico Aoto, Aoba Kawai, Mugi Kadowaki	
D E C E M B E R	26	Whoever Steals This Book	Daiki Fukuoka	Rin Kataoka, Sora Tamaki, Nao Tōyama, Junichi Suwabe, Shizuka Itō, Shimba Tsuchiya, Romi Park	
D E C E M B E R	26	Emergency Interrogation Room: The Final Movie	Jota Tsunehiro	Yūki Amami, Tetsushi Tanaka, Mocomichi Hayami, Kosuke Suzuki, Koji Okura, Muga Tsukaji, Manami Higa, Kuranosuke Sasaki, Masao Kusakari, Denden, Kanji Ishimaru, Fumiyo Kohinata	
D E C E M B E R	26	Girls und Panzer: Motto Love Love Sakusen Desu! – Act 1	Masami Shimoda	Mai Fuchigami, Ai Kayano, Mami Ozaki, Ikumi Nakagami, Yuka Iguchi	

== See also ==
- 2025 in Japan
- 2025 in Japanese television
- List of 2025 box office number-one films in Japan
