= List of 2025 box office number-one films in Japan =

The following is a list of 2025 box office number-one films in Japan by week. When the number-one film in gross is not the same as the number-one film in admissions, both are listed.

Week #	Date	Film	Gross	Notes
1	January 5, 2025	Cells at Work!	US$4,066,400	
2	January 12, 2025	La Grande Maison Paris	US$2,466,000	
3	January 19, 2025	Mobile Suit Gundam GQuuuuuuX: Beginning	US$3,839,400	
4	January 26, 2025	Mobile Suit Gundam GQuuuuuuX: Beginning	US$3,388,000	
5	February 2, 2025	Mobile Suit Gundam GQuuuuuuX: Beginning	US$1,742,600	In gross
5	February 2, 2025	366 Days	US$1,446,800	In attendance
6	February 9, 2025	1st Kiss	US$1,672,100	
7	February 16, 2025	Trillion Game: The Movie	US$4,062,100	
8	February 23, 2025	Trillion Game: The Movie	US$1,956,500	
9	March 2, 2025	1st Kiss	US$1,356,200	
10	March 9, 2025	Doraemon: Nobita's Art World Tales	US$4,757,800	
11	March 16, 2025	Doraemon: Nobita's Art World Tales	US$3,866,200	
12	March 23, 2025	Doraemon: Nobita's Art World Tales	US$2,316,800	
13	March 30, 2025	Doraemon: Nobita's Art World Tales	US$2,898,800	
14	April 6, 2025	Doraemon: Nobita's Art World Tales	US$2,224,800	
15	April 13, 2025	Doraemon: Nobita's Art World Tales	US$1,270,400	
16	April 20, 2025	Detective Conan: One-eyed Flashback	US$24,152,900	
17	April 27, 2025	Detective Conan: One-eyed Flashback	US$11,603,900	
18	May 4, 2025	Detective Conan: One-eyed Flashback	US$9,941,700	
19	May 11, 2025	Detective Conan: One-eyed Flashback	US$4,513,400	
20	May 18, 2025	Detective Conan: One-eyed Flashback	US$3,557,000	
21	May 25, 2025	Mission: Impossible – The Final Reckoning	US$5,947,000	
22	June 1, 2025	Mission: Impossible – The Final Reckoning	US$4,553,200	
23	June 8, 2025	Lilo & Stitch	US$3,902,300	
24	June 15, 2025	Lilo & Stitch	US$3,154,200	
25	June 22, 2025	Kokuho	US$3,500,900	
26	June 29, 2025	Kokuho	US$4,239,300	
27	July 6, 2025	Kokuho	US$4,454,600	
28	July 13, 2025	Kokuho	US$4,086,400	
29	July 20, 2025	Demon Slayer: Kimetsu no Yaiba – The Movie: Infinity Castle	US$37,346,700	
30	July 27, 2025	Demon Slayer: Kimetsu no Yaiba – The Movie: Infinity Castle	US$20,942,400	
31	August 3, 2025	Demon Slayer: Kimetsu no Yaiba – The Movie: Infinity Castle	US$16,645,200	
32	August 10, 2025	Demon Slayer: Kimetsu no Yaiba – The Movie: Infinity Castle	US$12,938,600	
33	August 17, 2025	Demon Slayer: Kimetsu no Yaiba – The Movie: Infinity Castle	US$12,737,800	
34	August 24, 2025	Demon Slayer: Kimetsu no Yaiba – The Movie: Infinity Castle	US$7,839,100	
35	August 31, 2025	Demon Slayer: Kimetsu no Yaiba – The Movie: Infinity Castle	US$7,448,500	
36	September 7, 2025	Demon Slayer: Kimetsu no Yaiba – The Movie: Infinity Castle	US$5,438,600	
37	September 14, 2025	Demon Slayer: Kimetsu no Yaiba – The Movie: Infinity Castle	US$5,651,200	
38	September 21, 2025	Chainsaw Man – The Movie: Reze Arc	US$8,449,700	
39	September 28, 2025	Chainsaw Man – The Movie: Reze Arc	US$5,374,100	
40	October 5, 2025	Chainsaw Man – The Movie: Reze Arc	US$5,979,700	
41	October 12, 2025	Chainsaw Man – The Movie: Reze Arc	US$4,176,500	
42	October 19, 2025	Chainsaw Man – The Movie: Reze Arc	US$3,861,100	
43	October 26, 2025	Chainsaw Man – The Movie: Reze Arc	US$2,608,200	
44	November 2, 2025	Chainsaw Man – The Movie: Reze Arc	US$2,870,600	
45	November 9, 2025	Jujutsu Kaisen: Execution	US$4,151,000	
46	November 16, 2025	Chainsaw Man – The Movie: Reze Arc	US$2,179,000	
47	November 23, 2025	Tokyo Taxi	US$1,870,500	
48	November 30, 2025	MGA Magical 10 Years Documentary Film: The Origin	US$1,613,900	
49	December 7, 2025	Zootopia 2	US$12,182,000	
50	December 14, 2025	Zootopia 2	US$10,471,000	
51	December 21, 2025	Zootopia 2	US$7,397,800	
52	December 28, 2025	Zootopia 2	US$7,421,800	

== Highest-grossing films ==
International film Japanese film

Highest-grossing films in 2025
Rank	Title	Gross
1	Demon Slayer: Kimetsu no Yaiba – The Movie: Infinity Castle	¥39.14 billion ($261.58 million)
2	Kokuho	¥19.55 billion ($130.65 million)
3	Detective Conan: One-eyed Flashback	¥14.74 billion ($98.51 million)
4	Chainsaw Man – The Movie: Reze Arc	¥10.43 billion ($69.7 million)
5	Cells at Work!	¥6.36 billion ($42.5 million)
6	Tokyo MER: Mobile Emergency Room – Nankai Mission	¥5.29 billion ($35.35 million)
7	Mission: Impossible – The Final Reckoning	¥5.28 billion ($35.29 million)
8	Moana 2	¥5.17 billion ($34.55 million)
8	Exit 8	¥5.17 billion ($34.55 million)
10	Jurassic World Rebirth	¥4.90 billion ($32.75 million)

== See also ==
- List of Japanese films of 2025
