= Gasaraki =

1998 mecha anime television series

- ガサラキ
- Genre: Mecha, Military, Supernatural
- Created by: Hajime Yatate; Ryōsuke Takahashi
- Developed by: Tooru Kozaki
- Directed by: Ryōsuke Takahashi
- Music by: Kuniaki Haishima
- Country of origin: Japan
- Original language: Japanese
- No. of episodes: 25

Production
- Producers: Eiji Kanaoka (TVO); Kazunori Takagi (Yomiko); Fumikuni Furusawa (Sunrise); Tsunetoshi Koike (Bandai Visual)
- Production companies: Television Osaka; Yomiko Advertising; Sunrise

Original release
- Network: TXN (TVO, TV Tokyo)
- Release: October 4, 1998 – March 28, 1999

Related
- Manga
- Written by: Meimu
- Published by: Kadokawa Shoten
- Imprint: Kadokawa Comics Ace
- Magazine: Shonen Ace
- Original run: October 1998 – May 2000
- Volumes: 4

Gasaraki (ガサラキ) is a 1998 mecha anime television series produced by Sunrise. It was created and directed by Ryousuke Takahashi with Goro Taniguchi as the assistant director

The series centers on Yushiro Gowa who pilots a bipedal weapons system known as a TA, short for Tactical Armor. Much of the initial plot is driven by means of news reports.

Set in the near-future, the series is formed around political narratives that concern a fictional war between the US and the fictional Middle Eastern country of Belgistan. An influential Japanese family, the Gowa, produce a bipedal weapon, the TA. When US military forces attempt to seize the capital they are systematically wiped out by what appear to be rival TAs. The Gowa Family seizes this opportunity to demonstrate their weapon system, and civilian pilot Yuushiro Gowa and the military squad to which he is attached are deployed to Belgistan. There, he meets rival TA pilot Miharu, with whom he seems to share a deep spiritual bond.

The series has a mix of futuristic and historical narratives and includes elements of Japanese culture, such as Noh and Shinto, rigid family hierarchies, corruption of government by zaibatsu, and samurai appear throughout the series.

== Plot ==
In ancient Japan, the Gowa family created a demonic Armor in order to defeat their enemies. Hundreds of years later in the 2010s, (Note: In episode 8, the character Miharu mentions the date October 4th 2006 being "over eight years" in the past.) this armor is exploited by the Gowa in the development of Tactical Armor for military usage and the usurpation of Japan.

== Characters ==
Yushiro Gowa (豪和 ユウシロウ, Gōwa Yūshirō)
The main character of Gasaraki is a quiet, withdrawn teenage boy who is viewed as a tool through which his elder brothers in the Gowa family seek to further their goals. He is a member of a special JSDF unit charged with testing the TA system. As a test pilot, he is found to possess the ability to synchronize to an extraordinary degree with the TA hardware, and in particular with the Mile One synthetic muscle tissue (a process described as a "Mental Burst"). At the behest of his family, he is also a performer of a fictional, mystical form of Noh theatre, the dance of Gasara, through which he is able to open dimensional gateways. Yushiro Gowa is voiced by Nobuyuki Hiyama in Japanese and Chris Patton in English.
Miharu (ミハル, Miharu)
Much like Yuushiro, Miharu is a quiet, introverted girl, who is a test subject for the organization known as Symbol. She pilots the organization's version of the TA, referred to as Fake. She's well aware of her role but does not seem to mind very much until she meets Yuushiro, who awakens in her the desire for self-determination. Miharu is voiced by Mami Kingetsu in Japanese and Monica Rial in English.
Kazukiyo Gowa (豪和 一清, Gōwa Kazukiyo)
The eldest of the Gowa brothers, he's very ambitious and cleverly plots his rise to power first in the family by replacing his father as master of the house and then in the world by weaving a complex political and economic web. He's obsessed with obtaining the power of the mysterious Gasaraki, which he believes will give him the ultimate supremacy, and will stop at nothing to acquire it. Kazukiyo Gowa is voiced by Yūji Takada in Japanese and Andy McAvin in English.
Kiyotsugu Gowa (豪和 清継, Gōwa Kiyotsugu)
The second son of Daizaburo Gowa, he's a man of science and an accomplished researcher. He's the genius behind the development of the TAs that he considers his lifework. To further his studies, he's ready to follow Kazukiyo's sinister plans, disregarding any danger that might befall his relatives or co-workers. Kiyotsugu Gowa is voiced by Sho Hayami in Japanese and Jason Douglas in English.
Kiyoharu Gowa (豪和 清春, Gōwa Kiyoharu)
The third son of Daizaburo Gowa, he's an expert analyst and mediator, qualities that make him a successful businessman. He agrees to support Kazukiyo even though he does not approve of some of his means. Kiyoharu Gowa is voiced by Isshin Chiba in Japanese and Brett Weaver in English.
Misuzu Gowa (豪和 美鈴, Gōwa Misuzu)
She's the youngest in the family and has a close relationship only with her father and older brother Yuushiro since they're only a few years apart. She knows something is not right in the family and tries to break through her sheltered upbringing to learn the truth about her beloved brother and ultimately herself. Misuzu Gowa is voiced by Satomi Koorogi in Japanese and Hilary Haag in English.
Meth (メス, Mesu)
A council member of Symbol he appears to be one of the top figures, taking orders directly from the President. He shows great interest in Miharu's development and well-being, coming to view her as a cherished person and not just a means to an end. Meth is voiced by Natsuo Tokuhiro in Japanese and Mike Kleinhenz in English.
Phantom (ファントム・F・フィーゼラー, Fantomu Efu Fīzerā)
Symbol's CEO Phantom is voiced by Issei Miyazaki in Japanese and Illich Guardiola in English.

== Media ==
=== Anime ===
Gasaraki consists of 25 television episodes which were first aired on TV Tokyo and the rest of the TX Network from October 4, 1998, to March 28, 1999. It was released on VHS and DVD in North America and the UK by ADV Films. Nozomi Entertainment has re-licensed the series and was re-released in 2012.

=== Video game ===
On January 13, 2000, the video game, Tactical Armor Custom Gasaraki, was released for the PlayStation.

== Episode list ==
No.	Title	Written by	Original release date
1	"On the Ancient Stage of Stone"; Transliteration: "Ishibutai" (Japanese: 石舞台)	Toru Nozaki	October 4, 1998
The Japanese Self Defense Force 3rd Experimentation Company tests Tactical Armors. The Gowa Corporate Group attempt to summon a force using the dancing of the fourth Gowa son, Yushiro. During his dance Yushiro has a vision of a woman, Miharu, who convinces him to stop. Meanwhile, an explosion occurs in the middle eastern country of Belgistan.
2	"Opening Movements"; Transliteration: "Jo no Mai" (Japanese: 序ノ舞)	Toru Nozaki	October 11, 1998
The United Nations send forces into Belgistan but are defeated. The Gowa family ponder what caused Yushiro to stop his dance. Kiyoharu Gowas presents a test run of the Tactical Armors to the Japanese Government.
3	"Tantric Circle"; Transliteration: "Tenkirin" (Japanese: 天気輪)	Toru Nozaki	October 18, 1998
The Gowa family conspires to have the Tactical Armors sent to Belgistan. Belgistan, using Tactical Armors known as Fakes provided by the international corporation Symbol defeat an American tank battalion approaching the country.
4	"Mirage"; Transliteration: "Shinkirō" (Japanese: 蜃気楼)	Yuichiro Takeda	October 25, 1998
The JSSDF 3rd Experimentation Company arrives in Belgistan and is sent to the experimental site where the explosion occurred, finding it similar to the stage of stone where Yushiro performed his dance. Yushiro goes into a trance and attempts to perform it again, but is nearly killed by a sniper. Symbol sends Miharu to the site leading a group of Fakes to gauge her and Yushiro's reaction to one another.
5	"The Touching"; Transliteration: "Sesshoku" (Japanese: 接触)	Chiaki Konaka	November 1, 1998
The Tactical Armors twice battle Symbol's Fakes, managing to procure a sample. The media obtains live footage of the battle, broadcasting it to the world.
6	"The Puppet"; Transliteration: "Ayatsuri Ningyō" (Japanese: 操り人形)	Toru Nozaki	November 8, 1998
Symbol stages a coup, overthrowing the Belgistan government, which immediately agrees to a cease-fire. While in Belgistan Yushiro encounters Miharu in an ancient church. The two are chased by Symbol and are helped first by Yushiro's colleagues, then by the mysterious Phantom.
7	"Return"; Transliteration: "Kikan" (Japanese: 帰還)	Yuichiro Takeda	November 15, 1998
Phantom assists Yushiro and returning to the JSSDF, which plan to head back to Japan. Symbol conspires to recover their sample, first by attempting to prevent them from taking off, then by sending fighter planes from a neighboring country after the plane once it is in the air. By using the Tactical Armor while in mid-air, Yushiro is able to destroy the fighter planes, ensuring the plane safe passage to Japan.
8	"Inferno"; Transliteration: "Kataku" (Japanese: 火宅)	Toru Nozaki	November 22, 1998
The 3rd Experimentation Company return to Japan, but are held in confinement in anticipation of the public announcement of the TA's existence. Meanwhile, Lt. Colonel Hirokawa introduces Kazukiyo Gowa to Kei Nishida, who seeks to overthrow the Japanese Government and strengthen Japan's well-being. Miharu leads a pair of Fakes to Gowa's laboratories in order to take back the sample that Gowa had procured. While there Miharu discovers that the real Yushiro died years before and tells this to Yushiro while escaping.
9	"Storehouse"; Transliteration: "Okura" (Japanese: 御蔵)	Chiaki Konaka	November 29, 1998
Gowa fails in its attempt to prevent the Symbol Fakes from escaping the city. Yushiro confronts his 'mother', who tells him to see Master Sorachi at the Gowa's abandoned storehouse. His younger sister heads there after him along with Ataka, one of Yushiro's fellow Tactical Armor pilots. While at the Storehouse Yushiro finds the dead body of the real Yushiro and finds a kugai, an ancient robot-like being in the basement. Miharu heads there with two Fakes.
10	"Kugai"; Transliteration: "Kugai" (Japanese: 骨嵬)	Chiaki Konaka	December 6, 1998
Yushiro goes into a trance and operates the Kugai, easily defeating Miharu and her colleague's Fakes. Yushiro and Miharu leave to head to Kyoto and find the truth. Meanwhile, the JSSDF attempts an experiment involving four Tactical Armors which goes horribly wrong.
11	"Ties"; Transliteration: "Kizuna" (Japanese: 絆)	Toru Nozaki	December 13, 1998
Yushiro and Miharu head through the woods while under pursuit and meet up with Misuzu and Ataka. The four are captured by Gowa's troops soon after. The 3rd Experimentation Company is recruited to stop a Tactical Armor piloted by an out of control, biologically enhanced soldier but find themselves overmatched.
12	"Unravel"; Transliteration: "Hokorobi" (Japanese: 綻び)	Yuichiro Takeda	December 20, 1998
The captured Miharu and the Kugai are put in the hands of Yushiro's brother Kiyotsugu. Yushiro rejoins the 3rd Experimentation Company and manages to successfully stop the out of control TA pilot.
13	"Disembark"; Transliteration: "Tabidachi" (Japanese: 旅立ち)	Toru Nozaki	December 27, 1998
Experiments on Miharu and the Kugai commence as Yushiro grows more suspicious of the recent events and his family's involvement. Daizaburo demands to know Kazukiyo's intentions, then forces the rest of the family to either side with him or Kazukiyo. His remaining sons choose Kazukiyo, making him the new head of the family. Daizburo assists Yushiro and Miharu in escaping.
14	"Companions"; Transliteration: "Dōkō" (Japanese: 同行)	Toru Nozaki	January 10, 1999
Kazukiyo meets with Nishida again, who surprises him with knowledge of the Kugustu Clan and Gasaraki. Yushiro and Miharu continue in their journey to Kyoto. Sorachi reveals the truth about the real Yushiro's death to Misuzu.
15	"The Threshold"; Transliteration: "Shikii" (Japanese: 閾)	Toru Nozaki	January 17, 1999
Arriving in Kyoto, Yushiro and Miharu witness the history of the Watanabe Clan, for whom they were pilots for the Kugai. When the Emperor orders the Kugai handed over, Tsuna Watanabe takes over the clan and refuses, instead plotting to head to the capital with the Kugai to overthrow the Emperor.
16	"Karma"; Transliteration: "Shukugō" (Japanese: 宿業)	Toru Nozaki	January 24, 1999
The flashback to the Watanabe Clan continues. The Watanabe Clan attacks the capital, but Miharu kills Tsuna when he attacks Yushiro, stopping the conflict. As a result of the flashbacks, Miharu goes catatonic.
17	"Chaos"; Transliteration: "Konton" (Japanese: 混沌)	Toru Nozaki	January 31, 1999
Yushiro and Miharu hide out in the Japanese slums, where they are helped by Wan, a gang member. Wan is actually a former member of Symbol and is recruited by Symbol to capture the two. Meanwhile, Kazukiyo, Hirokawa and Nishida plan their next move with the TAs, knowing that upcoming grain export news from the U.S. is sure to cause panic among the populace.
18	"Rear Window"; Transliteration: "Uramado" (Japanese: 裏窓)	Yuichiro Takeda	February 7, 1999
as the riot, resulting from the wheat embargo/supply delay/price rocketing begins, the ssdf chief grabs this chance to finally deploy the TA units, along with armed forces. Those suppress the rioters and gang members with plastic bullet shells, but also find a catatonic miharu, who was going outside collect water for her favourite lily-bell flowers. Before the TA unit capturing her, the heroic wan, fires the anti tank weapon at the optics of the unit and stops it's attempt, but gets injured in the process
19	"Wails"; Transliteration: "Dōkoku" (Japanese: 慟哭)	Toru Nozaki	February 14, 1999
miharu is captured by symbol forces while en route to tokyo via ship lanes. Wan gets mortally injured. The curfew on japan startes with TA's as enforcers.
20	"Upheaval"; Transliteration: "Dōran" (Japanese: 動乱)	Chiaki Konaka	February 21, 1999
A riot breaks out and the TA's fail to stop the onslaught. While they are busy a sniper rifle, causes the dire accident of the prime minister car and prime minister almost fatal injuring. As a consequence, a state of emergency begins.
21	"Run"; Transliteration: "Shissō" (Japanese: 疾走)	Toru Nozaki	February 28, 1999
Yushiro and his big sister like buddies, storm a us base where the symbol personnel were housing miharu to move her somewhere else. They try their best, even taking out an f-22, but still fail in their overall to get back miharu
22	"Personification"; Transliteration: "Gonge" (Japanese: 権化)	Toru Nozaki	March 7, 1999
After resuscitating for some time yushiro argues with douche of a brother for some time and then decides join the in the effort of stopping ongoing us action originating from the fleet in tokyo bay. On another scene, nishida and phantom exchange their ideals, confirming japan and usa are heading for a crash course.
23	"Eternal"; Transliteration: "Muken" (Japanese: 無間)	Toru Nozaki	March 14, 1999
US to stop japan from economic attacks tries to unleash the gasaraki monster figure with miharu as medium, through symbol operation in japan, Coincidentally yushiro was there and he stopped it. Then finally miharu wakes up from her catatonic state.
24	"Punctuation"; Transliteration: "Kutōten" (Japanese: 句読点)	Toru Nozaki	March 21, 1999
The battle over the hub of economic attack begins in japan between japanese and us TA's. US loses, japan suffers quite the damage in their TA armour. And then in the most bizarre twist, USA gives up this pursuit of escalation with japan and Japan responds in kind. Nishida then kills himself, as a sign of non-aggression. But kazukiyo, jerk of a big brother to yushiro, isn't satisfied.
25	"Gasara"; Transliteration: "Gasara" (Japanese: 餓沙羅)	Toru Nozaki	March 28, 1999
Kazukiyo, wanting desperately, to bring forth the gasaraki figure, uses the often-neglected sister of his, misuzu, as a medium, and almost succeeds in getting what he wanted always. But through the sheer power of familial love, only coming from yushiro, misuzu doesn't and the revealing other-dimansional source of gasaraki figure destroys kazukiyo, the boss of symbol-phantom and all the others deserving of death. The series ends with misuzu, the brocon, in the arms of his bro, yushiro, and of course, miharu looking toward the future, the end.

== Reception ==
Critical reception of Gasaraki has been generally positive. Issac Cynova of THEM Anime Reviews gave the series a rating of 3 out of 5 stars, handing out praise to the visuals, soundtrack, backgrounds, characters, the storyline, and mecha battles, but criticized the pacing of the series, stating that "much more like the Patlabor movies, it prefers to let action take a back seat to plot, and though this in itself is not a bad thing as far as I'm concerned, it does present a problem when combined with this one, singular, devastating fault: Its plot it stretched way too thin between twenty-six episodes." Cynova concludes that the series does get better near the end, and that "it's beautiful, and fairly well thought out, if not well executed."

Theron Martin of Anime News Network gave the series a B rating, praising the story, animation, and soundtrack, but criticized the series' main protagonist, the final episode of the series, and the overemphasis on Japanese nationalism, stating that "this is a very negative look at both Asian immigrants and the United States which, in the latter case, may not set well with some American viewers." Martin concludes that "this one is highly worth checking out if mecha content that emphasizes realism and technical detail more than cool factor sounds like your kind of thing."

Benjamin Wright of Animerica gave the series a positive review, stating that "Its story is deep, involving, and well thought out. Its characters are distinct and complex, with appeal for mature viewers as well as for the younger "nobody understands me" crowd. Its mecha, a masterful mix of lowbrow and high-tech, are imaginative and satisfying." However, he does note that the series starts off slow and that its first episode is unlikely to grab a lot of viewers.
