= Chastity High =

2024 Japanese television series

- Promotional release poster

Japanese name
- Kanji: 恋愛 バトルロワイヤル
Transcriptions
- Revised Hepburn: Renai Batoru Rowaiyaru
- Genre: Teen drama
- Written by: Eriko Shinozaki; Rin Shuto
- Directed by: Soushi Matsumoto; Yuka Yasukawa; Ryo Ota
- Starring: Ai Mikami; Ryubi Miyase
- Composer: Masaru Yokoyama
- Country of origin: Japan
- Original language: Japanese
- No. of episodes: 8

Production
- Executive producer: Makiko Okano
- Camera setup: Multi-camera
- Running time: 45-55 mins
- Production company: Robot Communications

Original release
- Network: Netflix
- Release: August 29, 2024

Chastity High (Japanese: 恋愛 バトルロワイヤル, Hepburn: Ren'ai Batoru Rowaiyaru, lit. Love Battle Royale) is a Japanese teen drama television series directed by Soushi Matsumoto, Yuka Yasukawa and Ryo Ota, and written by Eriko Shinozaki and Rin Shuto, and starring Ai Mikami and Ryubi Miyase. The series takes place in a prestigious high school, which devolves into chaos and rebellion after an anonymous account discovers and leaks personal secrets and forbidden love about many of its students.

The series is produced by Robot Communications, which premiered on Netflix on August 29, 2024.

== Plot ==
In a strict, yet prestigious high school, an anonymous social media account starts exposing students' forbidden romances and secrets. As their secrets are revealed, students turn against each other, desperate to protect their own. Chaos erupts, with accusations, obsessions, betrayals, and rebellion against the school's strict rules. A group of friends tries to uncover the identity of the person behind the account, hoping to end the madness before their own secrets are revealed.

== Cast ==
- Ai Mikami as Ichika Arisawa
- Ryubi Miyase as Ryogo Maki
- Rintaro Mizusawa as Atsushi Kanda
- Yudai Toyoda as Asuka Miyama
- Shiori Akita as Sawa Fujino
- Rino Wauchi as Ayami Ogata
- Kyoya Honda as Ruka Ichinose
- Shoki Nakayama as Yuma Nashiki
- Airi Aoki as Yuzuki Sakurai
- Honoka Kanemitsu as Koharu Nonami
- Ichika Osaki as Ema Komori

== Production ==
In June 2024, the series was announced on Netflix. Principal photography was completed in six months. The trailer of the series was released on 25 July 2024.
