= Ai Mikami =

Japanese actress (born 2000)

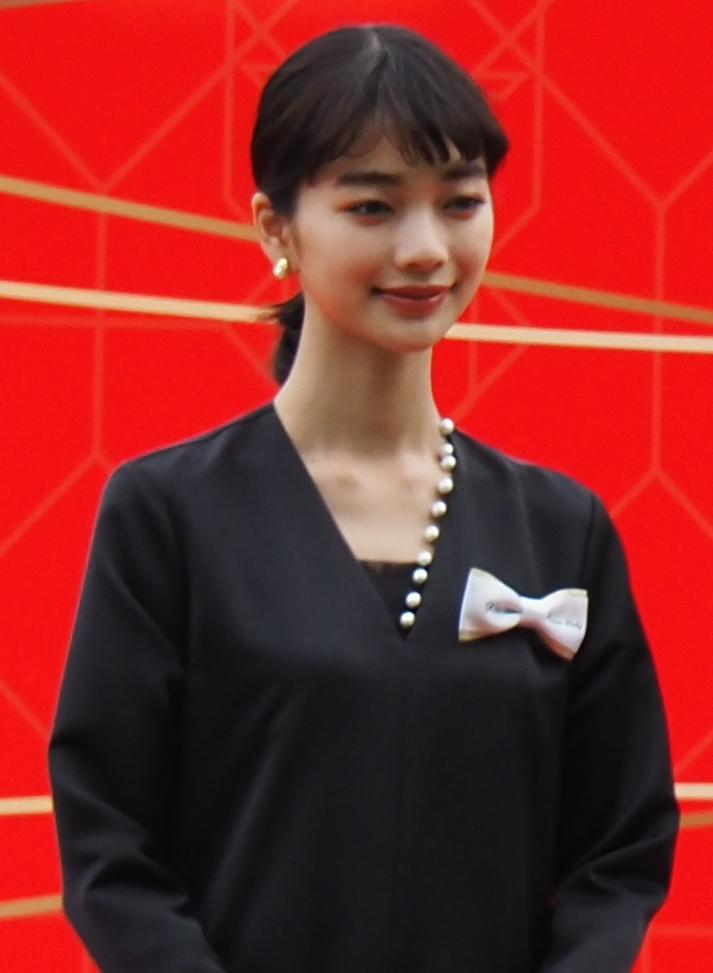
- Mikami in 2023
- Born: October 26, 2000 (age 26); Tokyo, Japan
- Education: Nihon University College of Art
- Occupation: Actress
- Years active: 2019–present
- Agent: Watanabe Entertainment

Japanese name
- Kanji: 見上 愛
- Hiragana: みかみ あい
Transcriptions
- Romanization: Mikami Ai

Ai Mikami (見上 愛, Mikami Ai; born October 26, 2000) is a Japanese actress under Watanabe Entertainment.

== Biography ==
Ai Mikami was born in Tokyo, Japan, on October 26, 2000. She has an older brother six years her senior. She trained in ballet from three until eighteen years old.

Mikami is good friends with fellow actress Yuumi Kawai, as both of them attended Nihon University College of Art together.

== Career ==
Mikami's parents, who were avid theatergoers, took her to a performance during her sophomore year of junior high school, where she fell in love with the industry and developed an interest in its backstage operations. She became involved with the drama club in high school and discovered the depth of backstage and directing work. From her experience with her drama club, she decided to either become a "director or learn how to act". This prompted her to enroll at Watanabe Entertainment training school, which ultimately led to her debut as an actress.

On August 31, 2019, she made her television debut as an actress in the seventh episode of the Saturday drama Voice: 110 Emergency Control Room on Nippon Television.

She had her first regular role in a TBS television drama Love Lasts Forever which aired from January 14 to March 17, 2020. On October 9 of the same year, she made her film debut in the movie Star Child.

She attracted much attention for her role as a high school girl with a complex about her appearance in the NHK television drama Beautiful Country that aired from April 12 to May 31, 2021. On December 10 of the same year, she appeared in her first leading role in a film co-starring with Yuki Kura in the movie Shodo.

She marked her first lead role in a television drama co-starring with Taiki Sato in the MBS/TBS drama Liar, which aired from February to April 6, 2022.

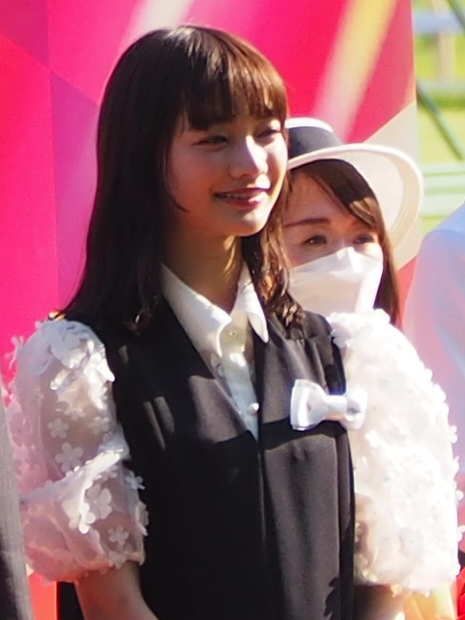
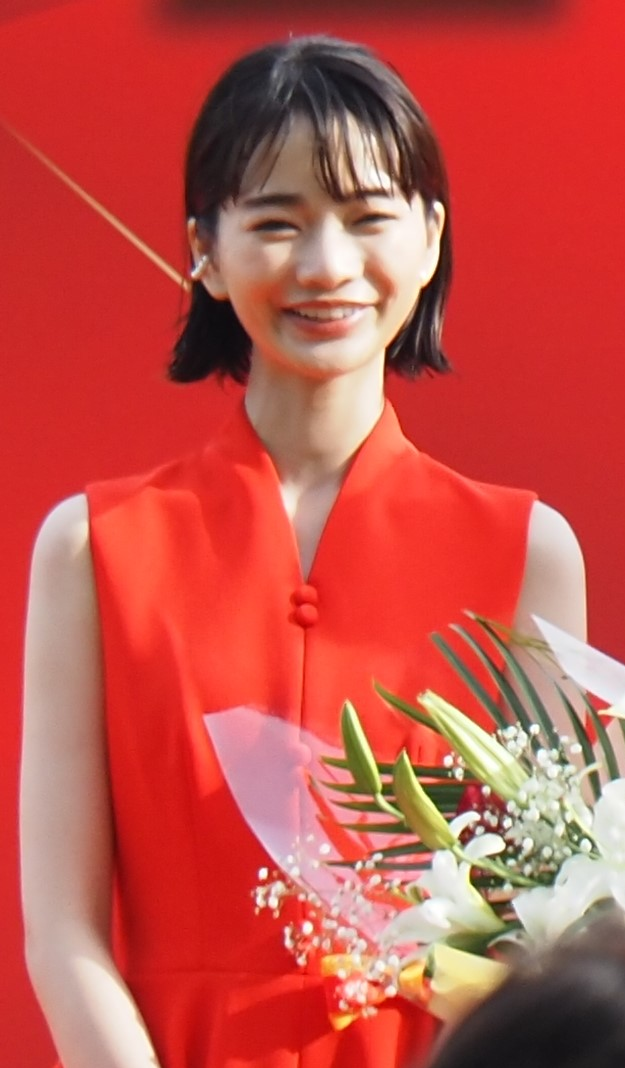
Mikami at the Tōkyō Yūshun Award Ceremony in May 2022 and 2024

On May 10, 2024, She starred in the film Undead Lovers. On June 30 of the same year, she made her first appearance in NHK's Taiga drama Dear Radiance, in which she portrayed the role of Fujiwara no Michinaga's daughter, Fujiwara no Akiko. On August 29, Mikami had her first lead role in a Netflix teen drama series, Chastity High.

== Filmography ==
=== Film ===
Year	Title	Role	Notes	Ref.
2020	Under the Stars	Sanae		
2021	A True Happy Ending	Mai		
2021	Character	Aya Yamashiro		
2021	Pretenders	Fuko Sendo		
2021	Impulse	Ai	Lead role	
2022	Offbeat Cops	Noriko Naruse		
2023	The Legend and Butterfly	Kitsuno		
2023	Yoko	Lisa Onoda		
2024	Remembering All the Nights	Summer		
2024	Undead Lovers	Rino Hasebe	Lead role	
2025	Kokuho	Fujikoma		
2025	Blank Canvas: My So-Called Artist's Journey	Kitami		
2026	All You Need Is Kill	Rita (voice)	Lead role	
2026	The Honest Realtor: The Movie	Haruka Yukino		
2026	The Apothecary Diaries: The Late Lady's Treasure	Yinshan (voice)		

=== Television drama ===
Year	Title	Role	Notes	Ref.
2019	Miss Jikocho: Professor Tenno's Survey File	Aika	Episode 3	
2020	Love Lasts Forever	Takatsu Wakana		
2020	Nogizaka Cinemas: Story of 46	Maya Shinozaki	Episode 5	
2021	Girl Gun Lady	Rei Kitamoto		
2021	Beautiful Country	Rin		
2021	Lemmings in the Miniature Garden	Mieko Shiraishi		
2022	There's a Song I Want to Play for You	Aya Nakao	Episode 3	
2022	More Than Words	Michiru Sasaki		
2022	I Can't Live Without Screaming	Mana		
2022	Liar	Misao Narita	Lead role	
2022	Is Love Sustainable?	Young Yoko Sawada		
2022	Double-edged Axe	Yoko Shibasaki		
2023	Learn the Meaning of Giving Up!	Hiyori Kusakabe	Lead role	
2023	Yu Yu Hakusho	Yukina		
2024	Chastity High	Ichika Arisawa	Lead role	
2024	When Spring Comes	Minako Osari		
2024	Re:Revenge - In the End of Desire	Saya Kinoshita		
2024	Game	Juri Katsuragi	Lead role	
2024	Dear Radiance	Fujiwara no Akiko	Taiga drama	
2024	Monthly Matsuzaka Tori	Saya	Episode 1	
2024	My Diary	Airi Hasegawa		
2025	The Honest Realtor: Minerva Special	Haruka Yukino	Television film	
2025–27	119 Emergency Call	Sara Niijima	2 seasons	
2026	The Scent of the Wind	Rin Ichinose	Lead role; Asadora	
2026	Viral Hit	Aki Yashio		

=== Music video appearances ===
Year	Song	Artist	Notes	Ref.
2019	"Tsubasa"	Saji		
2019	"One in a Million: Kiseki ni Yoru"	Generations from Exile Tribe		
2020	"Samidare"	Soushi Sakiyama	Find Fuse in Youth album	
2020	"Heaven"	Soushi Sakiyama	Find Fuse in Youth album	
2021	"Undulation"	Soushi Sakiyama	Find Fuse in Youth album	
2021	"Yellow"	Back Number		
2022	"Character"	Ryokuoushoku Shakai		
2023	"Fool"	Hitsujibungaku		

== Awards and nominations ==
Year	Award	Category	Nominated work(s)	Result	Ref.
2026	49th Japan Academy Film Prize	Newcomer of the Year	Kokuho	Won	
