= Sahel Rosa =

Kurdish-born Iranian-Japanese actress

- Born: Narges (Persian: نَرگِس); October 21, 1985 (age 41); Iran
- Other name: Sahel Rose
- Occupations: Actress, model
- Years active: 1991–present

Sahel Rosa (Japanese: サヘル・ローズ; Persian: ساحل رز, born 21 October 1985 in Iran), also sometimes known as Sahel Rose, is a Japanese actress of Kurdish origin, working in Japan. She was orphaned in the Iran-Iraq War at age four, and then was adopted, and later moved to Japan with her adopted mother.

== Biography ==
Sahel Rosa was originally from Iran. Her birth date and birth place are not clear but listed as either 21 October or 23 October 1985. At the age of four she became the only survivor of an air-raid attack on her house, in which her parents and ten siblings were killed. Her village was attacked by the Iraqi army even though there was supposed to be a cease-fire in place, and the Iran-Iraq War had officially ended more than a year earlier. She survived under rubble for four days until being discovered by a volunteer nurse named Flora.

After some time in an orphanage, Sahel appeared in a televised commercial at age six, describing her experiences and those of other war orphans. This commercial was seen by Flora, the same nurse who had rescued her about two years earlier. Flora adopted Sahel when Sahel turned eight years old, but later fell on hard times when her own family disowned her due to her non-traditional views. Flora had a Japanese fiancé and decided to move to Japan with her adopted daughter.

As a teen, Sahel entered the acting and modelling fields to help her adopted mother, who struggled financially to support herself and her daughter after being turned out by her fiancé shortly after their arrival in Japan. In 2009 she published her autobiography From the War Zone to (the Life of) an Actress. She frequently appears in anti-war documentaries, and in works dedicated to Japan's immigrant community and the Iranian diaspora.

== Filmography ==
- The Virgin Psychics (2015)
- Under the Turquoise Sky (2021)
- My Small Land (2022)
- Sisam (2024)
- Candle Stick (2025)
- Kowloon Generic Romance (2025)

== See also ==
- Iranians in Japan
