= It Takes More Than a Pretty Face to Fall in Love =

Japanese manga series

- First tankōbon volume cover

顔だけじゃ好きになりません (Kao Dake ja Suki ni Narimasen)
- Genre: Romantic comedy
- Manga
- Written by: Karin Anzai
- Published by: Hakusensha
- English publisher: NA: Comikey (digital) Seven Seas Entertainment
- Imprint: Hana to Yume Comics
- Magazine: Hana to Yume
- Original run: July 20, 2020 – September 20, 2025
- Volumes: 17
- Live-action film
- Directed by: Saiji Yakumo
- Written by: Kisa Miura
- Music by: Kōji Endō
- Studio: Asmik Ace; Robot
- Released: March 7, 2025
- Runtime: 104 minutes
- icon

It Takes More Than a Pretty Face to Fall in Love (Japanese: 顔だけじゃ好きになりません, Hepburn: Kao Dake ja Suki ni Narimasen) is a Japanese manga series written and illustrated by Karin Anzai. It was serialized in Hakusensha's shōjo manga magazine Hana to Yume from July 2020 to September 2025. A live-action film adaptation premiered in Japanese theaters in March 2025.

== Synopsis ==
Kanato is a social media influencer with underwhelming grades in high school. When Sana, a junior who is a fan of Kanato, finds out that he attends her school and is on the verge of getting expelled due to his bad grades, she decides to take control of his social media, so he can focus on his grades.

== Characters ==
Sana Chiken (知見才南, Chiken Sana)
Voiced by: Tomoyo Kurosawa (voice drama)
Portrayed by: Rinka Kumada
Kanato Ugo (宇郷奏人, Ugō Kanato)
Voiced by: Yūichirō Umehara (voice drama)
Portrayed by: Ryubi Miyase
Ryo Doigaki (土井垣凌, Doigaki Ryō)
Voiced by: Soma Saito (voice drama)
Portrayed by: Sota Nakajima
Yuzuri Nouhara (能原柚里, Nōhara Yuzuri)
Portrayed by: Reia Yonekura

== Media ==
=== Manga ===
Written and illustrated by Karin Anzai, It Takes More Than a Pretty Face to Fall in Love was serialized in Hakusensha's shōjo manga magazine Hana to Yume from July 20, 2020, to September 20, 2025. Its chapters have been compiled into seventeen tankōbon volumes as of March 2026.

The manga is licensed digitally in English by Comikey. In September 2024, Seven Seas Entertainment announced that they had licensed the series for English publication beginning in February 2025.

| No. | Original release date | Original ISBN | English release date | English ISBN |
|---|---|---|---|---|
| 1 | December 18, 2020 | 978-4-592-22352-8 | February 25, 2025 | 979-8-89160-890-0 |
Chapters 1–5; Extra
| 2 | July 20, 2021 | 978-4-592-22353-5 | May 20, 2025 | 979-8-89160-962-4 |
Chapters 6–10
| 3 | October 20, 2021 | 978-4-592-22354-2 | August 19, 2025 | 979-8-89373-421-8 |
Chapters 11–15
| 4 | March 18, 2022 | 978-4-592-22355-9 | December 2, 2025 | 979-8-89373-422-5 |
Chapters 16–20
| 5 | July 20, 2022 | 978-4-592-22366-5 | March 24, 2026 | 979-8-89373-423-2 |
Chapters 21–25
| 6 | November 18, 2022 | 978-4-592-22367-2 | June 23, 2026 | 979-8-89373-645-8 |
Chapters 26–30; Extra
| 7 | March 20, 2023 | 978-4-592-22368-9; 978-4-592-22880-6 (SE) | October 13, 2026 | 979-8-89561-363-4 |
Chapters 31–35; Extra
| 8 | August 18, 2023 | 978-4-592-22369-6 | December 8, 2026 | 979-8-89561-364-1 |
| 9 | November 20, 2023 | 978-4-592-22370-2 | March 9, 2027 | 979-8-89765-612-7 |
| 10 | March 19, 2024 | 978-4-592-22479-2 | June 22, 2027 | 979-8-89765-613-4 |
| 11 | July 19, 2024 | 978-4-592-22491-4 | — | — |
| 12 | November 20, 2024 | 978-4-592-22508-9; 978-4-592-23034-2 (SE) | — | — |
| 13 | February 20, 2025 | 978-4-592-22519-5 | — | — |
| 14 | March 19, 2025 | 978-4-592-22523-2 | — | — |
| 15 | August 20, 2025 | 978-4-592-22541-6 | — | — |
| 16 | November 20, 2025 | 978-4-592-22551-5 | — | — |
| 17 | March 19, 2026 | 978-4-592-22571-3; 978-4-592-22562-1 (SE) | — | — |

=== Live-action film ===
A live-action film adaptation was announced on July 19, 2024. It was produced by Asmik Ace and Robot and directed by Saiji Yakumo, based on a screenplay by Kisa Miura. Kōji Endō composed the music, and Asmik Ace distributed the film. The film premiered in Japanese theaters on March 7, 2025.

== Reception ==
The series won the BookLive Award at the 2022 Tsutaya Comic Awards.
