= Ryubi Miyase =

Japanese actor and model

- 宮世琉弥
- Born: January 22, 2004 (age 22); Japan
- Occupations: Actor; model
- Years active: 2015–present

Ryubi Miyase (宮世琉弥, Miyase Ryūbi; born January 22, 2004), is a Japanese actor, model, and singer associated with Stardust Promotion. He is a former member of the boy band Milk, a part of Stardust Promotion's male musical collective Ebidan.

== Filmography ==
=== Films ===
Year	Title	Role	Notes	Ref.
2023	The Dry Spell	Imanishi		
2024	My Home Hero: The Movie	Hayato Osawa		
2024	Lovesick Ellie	Akira Omi	Lead role	
2025	Suicide Notes Laid on the Table	Seiichi Chikage		
2025	Under Ninja	Shion Hachiya		
2025	It Takes More Than a Pretty Face to Fall in Love	Kanato Ugo	Lead role	
2025	Ya Boy Kongming! The Movie	Taijin Kabe		
2025	True Beauty: Before	Kaede Hayama		
2025	True Beauty: After	Kaede Hayama		
2026	The Keeper of the Camphor Tree	Soki Oba (voice)		
2026	One Year to Live, Buy a Man	Kiriya		

=== Television series ===
Year	Title	Role	Notes	Ref.
2019	Perfect World	Hirotaka Koreeda (young)		
2019	Hey Sensei, Don't You Know?	Koinuma		
2020	Mothers in Love	Shigeaki Kanbara		
2021	Night Doctor	Yuma Okamoto		
2021	How About Coffee	Bot-chan	Episodes 6–8	
2021	School Police	Yuma Sasaki		
2022	Murai in Love	Murai	Lead role	
2022	I Will Be Your Bloom	Daijiro Naruse/Naru		
2022	Cool Boys Only High	Issei Yanagi		
2023	Code Japan: The Price of Wishes	Satoru Nakagawa	Episodes 1–2	
2023	Ya Boy Kongming!	Taijin Kabe		
2024	Kururi: Who's in Love with Me	Ritsu Itagaki		
2024	Chastity High	Ryougo Maki		
