= Yūji Takada =

Japanese actor and voice actor

- Born: January 10, 1960 (age 66); Kanagawa Prefecture
- Occupations: Actor; Voice Actor

Yūji Takada (高田 裕司, Takada Yūji; born 高田 祐司, January 10, 1960 in Kanagawa Prefecture) is a Japanese actor and voice actor represented by Ōsawa Office. Takada has featured in numerous anime television series and drama series, and has also appeared as a narrator in numerous productions. In 1998, he made his debut in an anime with the Sunrise series, Gasaraki.

== Works ==
=== Narration ===
- Takeshi no Banbutsu Sōseiki (1995–2001)

=== Anime television series ===
- Gasaraki (1998), Kazukiyo Gōwa, Tsuna Watanabe
- Detective Conan (1999–present), Kansuke Yamato
- City Hunter: Death of the Vicious Criminal Ryo Saeba (1999), Jack Douglas
- Code Geass: Lelouch of the Rebellion (2006), Kyoshiro Tohdoh
- Saga of Tanya the Evil II (2026), Donald Habergram

=== Original net animation ===
- Baki Hanma (2023), Mitsuo Nonoka

=== Anime films ===
- Code Geass Lelouch of the Re;surrection (2019), Kyoshiro Tohdoh
- Detective Conan: One-Eyed Flashback (2025), Kansuke Yamato

=== Video games ===
- Persona 2: Eternal Punishment (2000), Katsuya Suō
- Code Geass: Lelouch of the Rebellion Lost Colors (2008), Kyoshiro Tohdoh
- Super Robot Wars Z2: Destruction Chapter (2011), Kyoshiro Tohdoh
- Super Robot Wars Z2: Rebirth Chapter (2012), Kyoshiro Tohdoh
