= Yuka Takeshima =

Japanese actress

- 竹島 由夏
- Born: June 3, 1986 (age 40); Tokyo, Japan
- Occupation: Actress
- Agent: Kart Promotion

Yuka Takeshima (竹島 由夏, Takeshima Yuka; born June 3, 1986 in Tokyo, Japan) is a Japanese actress represented by Kart Promotion.

Takeshima's hobbies are dancing, watching films, and reading. Her skills are playing the flute, playing the baton, and dancing to buyō.

== Filmography ==
=== TV series ===
Year	Title	Role	Notes	Ref.
1995	Ring: Kanzenban	Sadako Yamamura (child)		
1996	Minikui Ahiru no Ko	Eiko Takeda		
2000	Kamen Rider Kuuga	Mika Natsume		
2000	Rokubanme no Sayoko	Mika Yamada		
2009	Keishichō Minamidaira Han: Nana-ri no Deka	Ryoko Hiratsuka		
2010	Daimajin Kanon	Kaname Fukatsu	Episodes 5, 6, 18, 19	
2013	Yae's Sakura	Misao Yamakawa	From Episode 20; Taiga drama	

=== Films ===
Year	Title	Role	Notes	Ref.
1994	Night Head	Sakieda Tengen (child)		
1999	Gakkō no Kaidan 4	Sumiko Hoshina		
2018	Usuke Boys			
2022	Signature	Masako Anzō		
2025	Salary Man Kintaro			
2025	Salary Man Kintaro 2			
2025	Seppuku: The Sun Goes Down	Yoshino	Lead role	
2026	Service Oath			

=== Stage ===
Year	Title	Role	Notes	Ref.
2007	Rāmen Monogatari			
2007	Ten Count: Haru no Shō			
2008	Dream: sunflower			
2008	Kaettekita Hotaru	Reiko Torihama		
2009	Kikikaikai: Mo no Noke-tachi no Yoru	Osamu		

=== Advertisements ===
Year	Title	Notes
1995	East Japan Railway Company	

=== Music videos ===
Year	Title	Notes	Ref.
2006	Monkey Magic "Banana Uri no Shōjo"		

== Bibliography ==
=== Magazines ===
Title	Notes
B.L.T	
Young Champion	
