= Detective Conan: One-eyed Flashback =

2025 Japanese animated film by Katsuya Shigehara

- Theatrical release poster
- Kanji: 名探偵コナン 隻眼の残像
- Directed by: Katsuya Shigehara
- Written by: Takeharu Sakurai
- Based on: Case Closed by Gosho Aoyama
- Starring: Minami Takayama; Wakana Yamazaki; Rikiya Koyama; Megumi Hayashibara; Yūji Takada; Show Hayami; Ami Koshimizu; Yukimasa Kishino; Takeshi Kusao; Nobuo Tobita; Hiroaki Hirata; Mizuki Yamashita; Takayuki Yamada
- Music by: Yugo Kanno
- Production company: TMS/1st Studio
- Distributed by: Toho
- Release date: April 18, 2025
- Running time: 110 minutes
- Country: Japan
- Language: Japanese
- Box office: $162 million

Detective Conan: One-Eyed Flashback (Japanese: 名探偵コナン 隻眼の残像, Hepburn: Meitantei Konan Sekigan no Furasshubakku) is a 2025 Japanese animated mystery film directed by Katsuya Shigehara (in his feature directorial debut). It is the twenty-eighth installment of the Case Closed film series based on the manga series of the same name by Gosho Aoyama, following the 2024 film The Million-dollar Pentagram.

The film was released in Japanese theaters on April 18, 2025. It grossed ¥14.67 billion in Japan and over $162 million worldwide, becoming the third highest-grossing Japanese film of 2025, the 18th highest-grossing Japanese film and the 19th highest-grossing film released in Japan. It was also the 2nd highest-grossing Case Closed film of all time in Japan. The film premiered in the United States at the JW Marriott Los Angeles L.A. LIVE hotel in Los Angeles, California on July 5, 2025 as part of Anime Expo.

== Plot ==
Ten months ago at Yatsugatake mountain range, during the pursuit of Mikuriya Sadakuni, a suspect in the gun store robbery case eight years ago who disappeared while on parole, Kansuke Yamato was shot near his left eye. He was soon caught in an avalanche but was rescued, though with injury to his left eye and without memory of the incident.

At the present day, Kansuke and Yui Uehara investigated a break-in to the Nobeyama radio observatory. Meanwhile, Kogoro Mouri was contacted by Koji Sametani, his former colleague during his time in the police force. The two discussed the avalanche incident and the pursuit by Kansuke, and Sametani expressed interest to meet Kogoro in person. However, at the meeting point, Sametani was fatally shot. Unwilling to let go of his grief of leaving his friend to death, Kogoro joined Miwako Sato and Wataru Takagi to Nagano to search for more clues.

At Nagano, Kogoro, Sato, and Takagi met with Kansuke, Yui, Takaaki Morofushi and Atsunobu Hayashi. They also met Eizo Funakubo, father of Maki, the former biathlete who committed suicide following the injury suffered by the gun shop robbery incident. The police discovered that Sametani had earlier visited Sadakuni, who was imprisoned as a result of the plea bargain the police made with Takashi Washizu, another suspect of the robbery case. Washizu was given parole but escaped. Having noticed the involvement of Yuya Kazami, the assistant inspector from Public Security Bureau and the bug planted with him, Conan Edogawa, who went to Nagano with Ran, asked Rei Furuya for guidance with the investigation and deduced that this case must have involved PSB officer acting undercover in various agencies, and that Hayashi is also an undercover agent for the PSB.

The same night, while driving to the site of shooting incident, Yui and Kansuke were ambushed, but the culprit was forced to retreat thanks to the effort of Mitsuhiko, Genta and Ran. Yui, Kansuke and Morofushi took shelter at the nearby charcoal burner hut of Takashi Otomo, while other personnel were deployed to search the mountain range under supervision of Rikuo Hasebe, Prosecutor of Tokyo District Prosecution Office who went to Nagano to personally investigate the matter. However, the culprit is nowhere to be found. The next morning, while descending the mountain, the Nagano Police was ambushed again; Morofushi, in an attempt to push Kansuke out of the culprit's sight, plunged into freezing water but was later rescued. Conan and other police officers took shelter at Otomo's hut, but discovered that the culprit attempted to use the device in Otomo's hut to generate avalanche to bury them. Conan and most of the officers managed to take shelter after generating avalanche from other direction to counter the first avalanche, but Kansuke was apparently unable to take shelter in time, and it was reported that he is dead. At dusk, Conan provided information that reveals that Otomo is in fact Washizu, the escaped suspect of the robbery incident that leads to Maki's death.

At Nobeyama Observatory, it is also revealed that the culprit of the shooting incident is Hayashi, who is the lover of Maki who resents Mikuriya and Takashi for causing the death of Maki, and that he opposed the passing of law that will strengthen the plea bargain procedure. Having heard that Sametani, another undercover PSB agent, seeks to reopen the case involving Kansuke to support the deliberation of the law, Hayashi killed Sametani and tried to murder Kansuke before Kansuke can regain information that could incriminate him. In addition, Hayashi also used the antenna of the observatory to intercept military intelligence from satellites and use the information to force the Japanese Government to suspend the deliberation of the law. Hasebe then revealed that he is an officer of Cabinet Satellite Intelligence Center who participated in the investigation. It was also revealed that Kansuke's death was faked with the assistance of Kazami in order to put Kansuke out of harm's way. Hayashi attempted to escape, but the combined effort of Ai Haibara, Yutaka Ochi at the Observatory, Conan, Kogoro, Ran and the police allows Hayashi to be arrested.

In the post-credit scene, Furuya appeared before Hayashi and offered him the plea bargain: a penalty reduction from death sentence to life imprisonment in return for not disclosing the involvement of the PSB. Hayashi is enraged, but is also reminded that if he chooses to expose the PSB, his status as Maki's lover will be revealed and public perception towards Maki and Enzo will plunge. The Nagano Police discussed with each other at the hospital, where Yui noted that Conan already informed her that Kansuke is alive. Morofushi believed that Conan is being considerate towards Yui, and while Kansuke criticized Yui for overreacting for the loss of colleague, Yui replied that the reaction may be simply beyond the working relationship.

== Cast ==
Character	Japanese voice actor
Conan Edogawa	Minami Takayama
Shinichi Kudo	Kappei Yamaguchi
Ran Mouri	Wakana Yamazaki
Kogoro Mouri	Rikiya Koyama
Ai Haibara	Megumi Hayashibara
Kansuke Yamato	Yūji Takada
Takaaki Morofushi	Show Hayami
Yui Uehara	Ami Koshimizu
Hyōe Kuroda	Yukimasa Kishino
Rei Furuya / Tōru Amuro	Takeshi Kusao
Yuya Kazami	Nobuo Tobita
Koji Sametani	Hiroaki Hirata
Dr. Hiroshi Agasa	Kenichi Ogata
Ayumi Yoshida	Yukiko Iwai
Genta Kojima	Wataru Takagi
Wataru Takagi	Wataru Takagi
Atsunobu Hayashi	Wataru Hatano
Mitsuhiko Tsuburaya	Ikue Ōtani
Madoka Tsuburai	Mizuki Yamashita
Omoto Takashi	Takayuki Yamada

== Soundtrack ==
The film's theme song is "TWILIGHT!!!" performed by King Gnu.

== Promotion and release ==
The film was announced on December 3, 2024. The film's staff was also revealed that day with Katsuya Shigehara directing the film with the screenplay being handled by Takeharu Sakurai, who previously wrote various films in the Detective Conan series. The film was released in Japan on April 18, 2025.

== Reception ==
=== Box office ===
Detective Conan: One-eyed Flashback grossed 3,438,626,700 yen ($24.41 million) in its first weekend, becoming the number one film at the Japanese box office, surpassing Doraemon: Nobita's Art World Tales, which had held the number one spot at the Japanese box office since its release on March 7, 2025.

As of September 4, 2025, Detective Conan: One-eyed Flashback grossed $55 million in China, making it the highest-grossing film of the series in the country. The film grossed ¥14.67 billion ($99.7 million) in Japan, making it the third highest-grossing domestic film of 2025.

=== Critical reception ===
Phil Hoad, writing for The Guardian, rated the movie three out of five stars, commenting that "somehow this blend of hardcore procedural and Scooby-Doo amateur sleuthing gets by on sheer energy alone, rolling up different-toned vignettes – noirish requiem, heavenly hallucinations, AstroBoy-type action sequences, educational segments – in anime’s unmistakeable style."

=== Accolades ===
Award	Date of ceremony	Category	Recipient(s)	Result	Ref.
AnimaniA Awards	July 31, 2026	Best Movie: Cinematic Release	Detective Conan: One-eyed Flashback	Nominated	
Anime Grand Prix	July 13,2026	Grand prix	Detective Conan: One-eyed Flashback	8th place	
Anime Grand Prix	July 13,2026	Best character	conana Edogawa	4th place	
Crunchyroll Anime Awards	May 23, 2026	Best Voice Artist Performance (German)	Dirk Bublies(as Kogoro Mori)	Nominated	
Japan Academy Film Prize	March 13, 2026	Best Animation Film	Detective Conan: One-eyed Flashback	Nominated	
Japan Expo Awards	July 10, 2026	Daruma for Best Feature Film	Detective Conan: One-eyed Flashback	Nominated	
Manga Barcelona Awards	December 5,2025	Best Anime Movie Premiere	Detective Conan: One-eyed Flashback	Nominated	
