= Exorcismus =

- Spanish film poster
- Directed by: Manuel Carballo
- Written by: David Muñoz
- Produced by: Julio Fernández
- Starring: Tommy Bastow; Stephen Billington; Doug Bradley; Sophie Vavasseur
- Cinematography: Javier Salmones
- Edited by: Manuel Carballo
- Music by: Zacarías M. de la Riva
- Production company: Filmax
- Distributed by: Filmax
- Release date: 13 October 2010 (Sitges)
- Running time: 98 minutes
- Countries: Spain; United Kingdom
- Language: English

Exorcismus (Spanish: La posesión de Emma Evans) is a 2010 horror film directed by Manuel Carballo and written by David Muñoz, it stars Sophie Vavasseur and Stephen Billington.

== Plot ==
Secluded, home-schooled teenager Emma's uncontrolled behaviour causes her to believe she is possessed by the Devil. When terrible things start to happen to her friends and family, her parents grudgingly call in the help of her uncle, who is a priest, to drive out the evil spirits.

== Cast ==
- Sophie Vavasseur as Emma Evans
- Tommy Bastow as Alex Evans
- Richard Felix as John
- Stephen Billington as Christopher
- Doug Bradley as Priest
- Isamaya ffrench as Rose Evans
- Lazzaro Oertli as Mark Evans (Emma's brother)
- Cristina Cervià as Sofia Salgado

== Production ==
In November 2008 Luis de la Madrid was set to direct the exorcism film, but on 22 September 2009 he was replaced by Manuel Carballo. The Spanish director David Muñoz wrote the script, and shooting began on 5 October 2009 in the Studios of Filmax.

== Release ==
Screening rights were secured in the UK by E1 Entertainment, in Australia by Vendetta, in Brazil by Playarte, in Italy by Mediafilm, by Gulf Film for the Middle East, Lusomundo for Portugal and CDi acquired the screening rights for Argentina, Paraguay, Uruguay and Chile. The film was released in the United States as The Possession of Emma Evans, in 2011.
