= Hannah Trigwell =

- Born: 28 October 1990 (age 35)
- Origin: Wakefield, West Yorkshire, England
- Occupations: Singer, songwriter
- Instruments: Guitar, vocals
- Years active: 2007–present
- Website: www.hannahtrigwell.com

Hannah Trigwell (born 28 October 1990) is an English singer-songwriter from Wakefield, West Yorkshire, England. She has released numerous singles, three EPs and one album containing original material. Her debut EP, Hold My Heart, was released in May 2010 followed up by Pieces in November 2013. In August 2018, Trigwell independently released her debut album entitled Red which charted at number 4 in Malaysia and number 17 in Denmark. She has been independently releasing music under the independent record label that she founded in 2015 (TeaPot Records) the latest of which reached Number 13 in the Club Chart.

== Music career ==
Hannah Trigwell began her musical career at the age of 17, when, as a self-taught singer and guitarist, she took to the streets of Leeds to play her music for anyone that cared to stop and listen. Her YouTube page, containing videos of live versions of original songs and covers, as well as 'Vlogs' has gathered over 120 million views. One of Trigwell's most popular videos, a cover of Leonard Cohen's "Hallelujah", has garnered over nine million views since it was uploaded in December 2011.

In May 2010, Trigwell released her debut EP, Hold My Heart, which reached number 6 in the iTunes Singer-Songwriter albums chart. Off the back of the success of Hold My Heart Trigwell saw out 2010 by playing sold out shows at London Scala, Birmingham O_{2} and Manchester Academy, whilst touring in support of Boyce Avenue on their 2010 Fall Tour.

Her debut single, "Headrush", was released in April 2011 and was celebrated with a sold-out launch party at Leeds Cockpit. In March 2014, this became the Number 1 selling single in Vietnam (March 2014) and in Laos (August 2015). In Summer 2011, Hannah Trigwell's hard work and talent was recognised with a nomination for Best International Unsigned Act 2011 at the Online Music Awards sponsored by St. Helier Cider. In July 2011, it was announced that she had won.

From October 2012 to early 2014, Trigwell was signed with an independent covers recording label in the US called 3 Peace Records, founded by Florida-based rock band, Boyce Avenue through which she released her cover versions of popular songs – these videos now have a total of more than 80 million views. Between 2015 and 2017, Trigwell toured the UK and Europe three times and after supporting Jeremy Loops on a sold-out tour of the UK and Europe in 2016, she performed to over 2,000 people at her sold-out headline performance in Doha, Qatar. Trigwell was invited to perform alongside acts including Stereophonics, Faithless, Sigma, Jess Glynne and Gabrielle Aplin at the Isle of Wight Festival in 2016 and 2017.

She founded an independent record label and mentorship service, TeaPot Records, in 2015. The first release under TeaPot Records, titled "Another Beautiful Mistake" was supported by BBC Radio 1 this was followed up by a dance remix of "Another Beautiful Mistake" by Belgium-based DJ, Captive. The Captive remix of "Another Beautiful Mistake" was released under TeaPot Records in Spring 2017, and frequently played in clubs around the world. On 20 March, it was announced by Music Week that the track had reached a new club chart position at Number 13.

In August 2018, Trigwell released her debut album Red which was recorded in her hometown of Leeds. The album reached top 10 positions across multiple international charts. She followed up the album release with a sold-out 12-date European tour.

More recently, Hannah has channelled her music industry expertise into hosting the ‘Backstage Pass’ podcast series by Europe’s biggest musical instrument retailer, Thomann, as well as being the face of the brand's educational miniseries 'Music Without Theory'.
