= FranKo =

English alternative rock band

- Origin: South London, England
- Genres: Pop rock, Alternative rock, Pop-punk
- Years active: 2007-2013; 2023-present
- Members: Tommy Bastow; Richard Craker; Chris Gilbertson; Richard "Ricky" Rayner
- Past members: Beau Poynts
- Website: www.frankoband.com

FranKo are an English pop/rock/alternative band from South London, England. The group consists of Tommy Bastow (Lead Singer), Richard Craker (vocals/guitars), Chris Gilbertson (Bass/backing vocals) and Richard "Ricky" Rayner on the Drums.

2011 saw them enter the inaugural Online Music Awards, where they were the only entrants selected as finalists in 2 categories by an industry panel. They won 'Best Rock Act 2011' as voted by the public. The second category was 'Best international Unsigned'.

== Discography ==
Albums

Year	Title
2010	Vote FranKo
2011	FranKo

Singles

Year	Title
2009	Breathe
2009	Night Time
2009	Today
2009	Take A Bow
2010	Love For Fame
2011	Vienna
2012	Eye of the Storm

== Band members ==
- Tommy Bastow – lead vocals (2007–present)
- Richard Craker – guitar, vocals (2007–present)
- Christopher Ian Gilbertson – bass, backing vocals (2007–present)
- Richard 'Ricky' Rayner – drums (2011–present)
- Beau Poynts – drums (2007–2011)
