= List of The Cut characters =

List of characters in the television series The Cut

The Cut is a British television drama series. This is a list of the characters, and who portrays them.

== Main characters ==
Actress Lara Goodison who plays Marla Mackinnon is the only actor to appear in every episode of The Cut in all three series. The following characters appear in the programme as of 18 December 2010.

Character	Actor	Episodes	Number of episodes
Marla Mackinnon	Lara Goodison	1x01 - 3x12	40
Daniel 'Mack' Mackinnon	Dermot Martin	1x01 - 2x02, 2x04 - 2x07, 2x10 - 2x11, 2x13 - 3x04, 3x06 - 3x12	35
Stephen Mackinnon	Matthew Kane	1x01 - 2x02, 2x04 - 3x01, 3x03, 3x11 - 3x12	31
Antonia 'Toni' Loxley	Jessica Dickens	1x01 - 3x01	29
Olive Loxley	Billie North	1x01 - 2x13, 3x12	29
Alex Fitzpatrick	Connor Scarlett	2x01 - 3x12	25
Francesca 'Frankie' Stern	Maisie Crossland	2x01 - 3x12	25
Cameron Benedick	Wilfred Taylor	2x01 - 3x12	25
Catherine Cadence	Deborah May	2x04 - 3x12	22
Elliott Baden	Alex Roe	2x05 - 3x12	21
Rosa Willis	Scarlett Bowman	1x01, 1x04 - 1x05, 1x07, 1x09 - 1x11, 1x13 - 2x05, 3x05 - 3x06, 3x10 - 3x12	20
Jay Kelso	Samuell Benta	1x01 - 1x15, 2x10 - 2x13	19
Thomas 'Tommy' Fitzpatrick	Edward Green	1x09 - 2x06, 2x12 - 3x01	16
Amy Mackinnon	Tilly Wood	1x11, 1x14 - 1x15, 2x02, 2x04 - 2x08, 2x10 - 2x13, 3x11 - 3x12	15
Fin Scott	Alice Southwood	1x01 - 1x02, 1x06 - 1x15	12
Ruby Hathaway	Stephanie Blacker	3x01 - 3x12	12
Taylor Mackinnon	Kellie-Rose Demmel	3x01 - 3x12	12
Jack Simmons/Andrew Cromwell	Dominic Sherwood	3x01, 3x03 - 3x12	11
Rory Andrews	Duane Henry	2x01 - 2x02, 2x05 - 2x13	11
Luke Atwood	Luke Newton	3x02 - 3x12	11
Ryan Hathaway	Stephen Hagan	3x01 - 3x06, 3x08 - 3x10	9
Noah Achebe	Tosin Cole	3x04 - 3x12	9

== Recurring characters ==
Character	Actor	Episodes	Number of episodes
George	Felix Jordan	2x03, 2x05 - 2x13	10
Dean Frogmarsh	Thomas Williamson	2x03, 2x08 - 2x09, 3x03	4
Greg Cranborne	Tommy Bastow	3x05, 3x07 - 3x09	4
Carly Stern	Anjela Lauren Smith	3x02, 3x11 - 3x12	3
Tom Deacon	Himself	3x01, 3x04 - 3x05	3
Kevin Reynolds	Adrian Turner	3x07 - 3x08, 3x10	3
Tina Fry	Melissa Ambrosini	1x01, 1x03	2
'Little' Joey Horton	Steven Hartley	1x07, 2x07	2
WPC Morgan	Amanda Morgan	2x01 - 2x02	2
Mr Fitzpatrick	James Staddon	2x06 - 2x07	2
Kelly	Georgina Campbell	3x09 - 3x10	2
