= Tommy Bastow =

English actor and musician

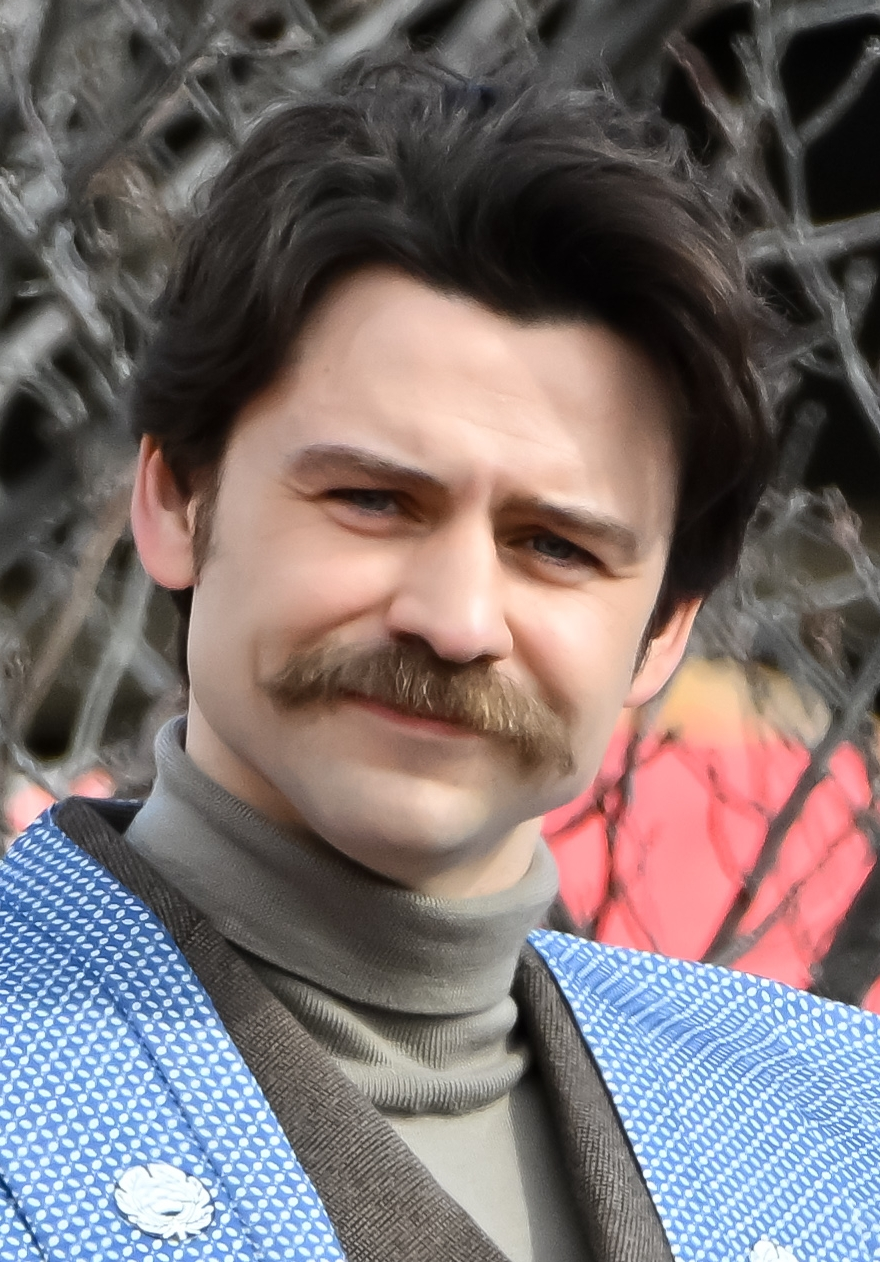
- Bastow in February 2026
- Born: Thomas Derek Bastow; 26 August 1991 (age 34); Epsom, Surrey, England
- Occupations: Actor; musician
- Years active: 2005–present
- Family: Jodie Bastow (sibling)

Thomas Derek Bastow (born 26 August 1991) is an English actor and musician from Epsom, Surrey. He is best known for playing the character Dave the Laugh in Angus, Thongs and Perfect Snogging, and more recently for his work on Disney FX Shōgun, and the NHK morning drama The Ghost Writer's Wife. He is also the lead singer in the band FranKo.

== Education ==
Bastow attended the independent City of London Freemen's School, and later transferred to the BRIT School in Croydon, a state school that specialises in the performing arts. Bastow then graduated with a BA Acting from the Drama Centre London (Class of 2015/2016).

== Acting career ==
In 2008, he appeared in two episodes of the CBBC programme M.I.High as Lewis Chuckworth, and in a short film titled Londongrad. Bastow landed his first major film role playing the character of "Dave the Laugh" in Angus, Thongs and Perfect Snogging, released in July 2008. In December 2008, he played the role of a young Sir Guy of Gisborne for an episode of the BBC One mini-series Robin Hood which aired on 6 June 2009. In 2009, he also had a role in The Boys Are Back starring Clive Owen. Bastow starred in the 2010 Spanish-American horror film Exorcismus, which is produced by Filmax. He also appeared in a recurring role in teen drama The Cut, a BBC Switch program, playing Greg Cranborne. In 2011 he appeared in EastEnders as Seb Parker.

On 27 November 2024, he was cast as Haven (ヘブン, Hebun; written in Romaji), a character based on the real-life Lafcadio Hearn, also known as Yakumo Koizumi (小泉八雲), on the NHK Asadora (Japanese morning tv series) The Ghost Writer's Wife (ばけばけ). Haven is the husband of Toki Matsuno (松野トキ), the protagonist and the heroine of the show, based on the real-life Koizumi Setsuko (小泉節子), and played by Akari Takaishi (高石あかり). He was chosen from among 1767 applicants (246 from Japan, 1352 from America, 149 from England, and 20 from Australia and New Zealand).

== Music career ==
In 2005, Bastow became the lead singer of a band called Blackspray. In October 2007, Bastow and members of another band called Hawkwood (two of which are also students from the BRIT School) formed FranKo.

In 2008, FranKo played their first gigs in the UK and recorded their debut EP with producer Jim Lowe (Stereophonics, Foo Fighters, Manic Street Preachers). Later that year, the band toured Thailand which included an appearance on MTV Thailand. They also toured with Elliot Minor and Me vs Hero.

On 31 March 2010, FranKo released their 10 track debut album Vote FranKo. The first single off the album was "Night Time" released in September 2009. In July 2011 FranKo released their second album FranKo. They played a tour supporting Room 94 (July 2011) and a tour with Dave Giles (October 2011).

FranKo reformed in 2021 and are currently working on their latest studio album with a tour in Japan set for December 2026.

== Filmography ==
=== Films ===
Year	Title	Role	Ref.
2008	Londongrad	Young Konstantin	
2008	Angus, Thongs and Perfect Snogging	Dave the Laugh	
2010	Exorcismus	Alex	
2013	Off the Aisle	Dylan Watson	
2021	Never Back Down: Revolt	Aslan	

=== Television ===
Year	Title	Role	Other notes	Ref.
2008	M.I.High	Lewis Chuckworth	Two episodes	
2009	Robin Hood	Young Sir Guy of Gisborne	One episode (Episode 10)	
2010	The Cut	Greg Cranborne	4 episodes	
2011	EastEnders	Seb Parker	Recurring role	
2013	Reetie: The Friendship	Jason Lane		
2016	Harley and the Davidsons	Otto Walker	Miniseries	
2017	Man in an Orange Shirt	Bates	Miniseries	
2018	The Crossing	Marshall	Recurring Role	
2018	Agatha Raisin	Barry Jackson	One episode (2-02)	
2024–present	Shōgun	Father Martin Alvito	Recurring role	
2025–26	The Ghost Writer's Wife	Lefkada Heavin	Asadora	

=== TV commercials ===
Year	Title	Role
2005-14	BT Group	Joe

== Theatre ==
Year	Title	Role	Venue	References
2012	Harold and Maude	Harold Chasen	Tron Theatre, Glasgow	
