= Shouma Kai =

Japanese actor

- 甲斐 翔真
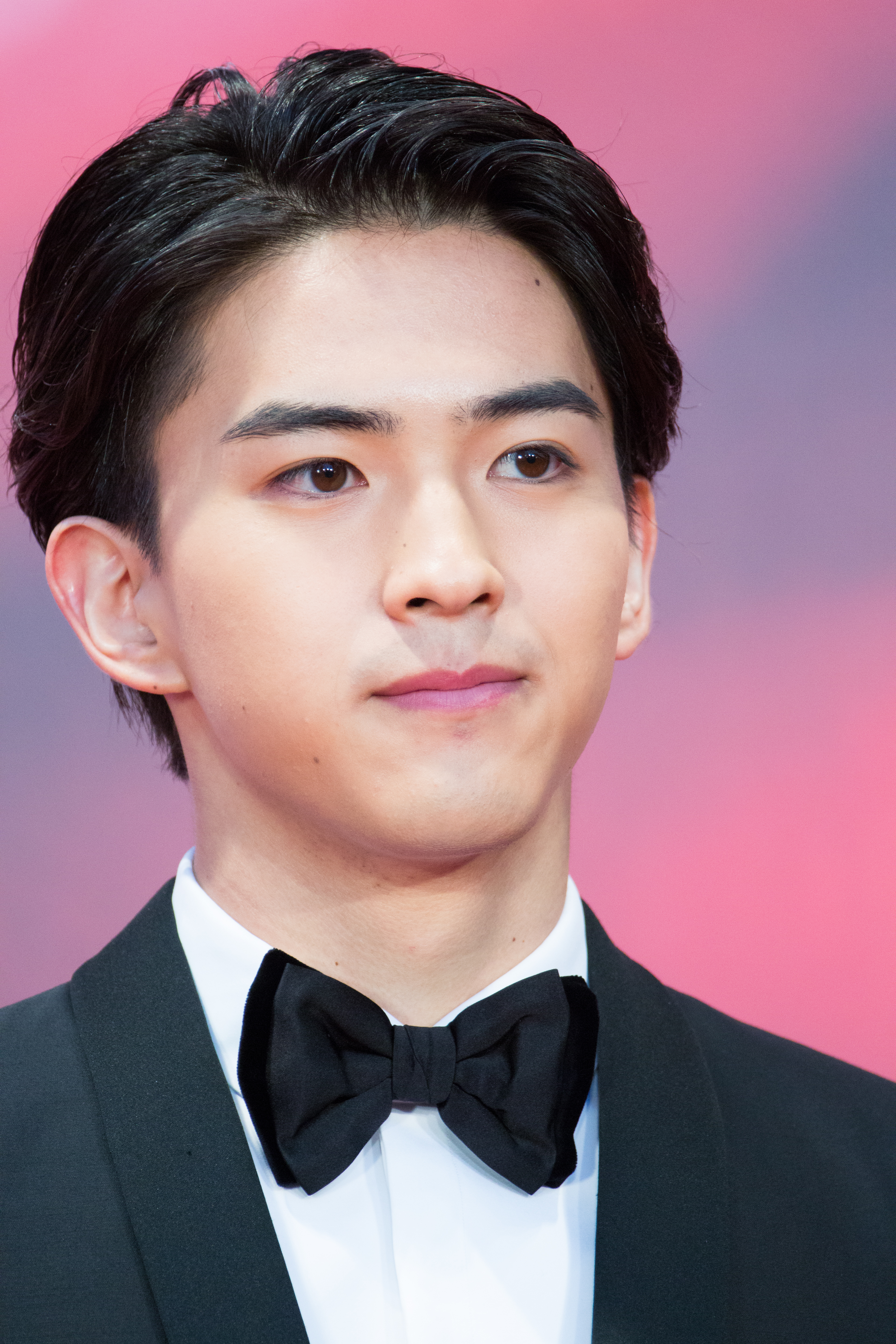
- Kai at Opening Ceremony of the Tokyo International Film Festival, 2017.
- Born: 14 November 1997 (age 28); Tokyo
- Occupation: Actor
- Years active: 2015-present
- Agent: Amuse, Inc.

Shouma Kai (甲斐 翔真, Kai Shōma; born 14 November 1997, in Tokyo) is a Japanese actor. He is represented by Amuse, Inc.

== Biography ==
Kai debuted in 2015. He was scouted by the talent agency Amuse during high school. However, at the request of his principal, Kai finished high school before entering the entertainment business. As of 2020, he started to take part in musicals and plays.

In 2016, Kai made his first television appearance in Kamen Rider Ex-Aid as Parado / Kamen Rider Para-DX.

== Filmography ==
=== TV drama ===
Year	Title	Role	Notes	Ref.
2016	Kamen Rider Ex-Aid	Parado/Kamen Rider Para-DX (voice)		
2018	Gambling Emperor Legend Zero	Nashimoto		
2025	Unbound	Choshichi	Taiga drama	
2026	The Scent of the Wind	Goro Ogawa	Asadora	

=== Films ===
Year	Title	Role	Notes	Ref.
2021	Wheel of Fortune and Fantasy	Sasaki	Anthology film	

=== Theatre ===
Year	Title	Role	Notes	Ref.
2023-2024, 2027	Moulin Rouge!	Christian		
