= Naho Toda =

Japanese actress (born 1974)

- 戸田菜穂
- Born: Naho Toda; March 13, 1974 (age 52); Hiroshima, Japan
- Years active: 1991–present
- Spouse: Unknown (m. 2010)
- Children: 2

Naho Toda (戸田 菜穂, Toda Naho; born March 13, 1974) is a Japanese actress.

== Career ==
In 1990, she successfully passed an audition called Horipro Talent Scout Caravan(Ja).

== Personal life ==
She had graduated from Tamagawa University.

Her sister was an actress, and her brother Kōhei Toda (Ja: 戸田康平, Toda Kōhei) is a singer and songwriter. In August 2010, she married her husband, a doctor she met through mutual friends.

In the following August 2011, she announced she was pregnant with her first child and she gave birth to her daughter in February 2012. Toda has stated that she plans to continue her career after childbirth.

== Filmography ==
=== TV dramas ===
- Good Wife (1993), Yūki Usami
- Power Office Girls (1998–2003), Misono Sugita
- Yoshitsune (2005), Sukeko
- Galápagos (2023)
- Asura (2025)
- Anpan (2025), Chiyoko Yanai

=== Movies ===
- Natsu no niwa - The Friends (1994)
- Blooming Again (2004)
- The Craft of Memories (2020)
- The Woman of S.R.I. the Movie (2021), Mikie Shiba
- And So the Baton Is Passed (2021)
- Takatsu-gawa (2022)
- Akira and Akira (2022)
- Silent Parade (2022), Machiko Namiki
- The Master Sake Brewers (2022)
- Do Unto Others (2023)
- Dear Family (2024), Yuki Kawano
- Seishun Gestalt Houkai (2025), Yoko Mamiya
- A Distant Neighborhood (2026), Kazue Nakahara
- A Bouquet of Light for You (2026), Harue Someya
- Kill Your Tears, Okiharu (2026), Setouchi
