= Online Music Awards =

Online Music Awards was a UK-based awards ceremony for unsigned musicians which initially took place in 2011, and again in 2012. The awards were intended to take place annually with nominees, voting and winners announcements taking place on the Online Music Awards social network. The original headline sponsor was St Helier Cider. The awards briefly returned in 2015 but were cancelled within the second month of nominations. It's currently unclear if they will return at a later date.

The 2011 ceremony featured names such as Tim Westwood, The Noisettes, Ace of Base and Roll Deep announcing nominees via pre-recorded videos. Rozonda Thomas from R&B group TLC recorded a message of support for the nominees. Tony Cowell announced the nominees for the Best International Unsigned Act. In total, seven categories were rewarded including Best Urban Act, Best Dance Act, Best Rock Act, Best Pop Act, Best International Act, Best Music Video and Best Music Website.

In 2012 Online Music Awards were in aid of UK-based charity War Child. Jermaine Jackson was a guest introducer for the 2012 awards which otherwise featured unknown presenters. The 2012 awards included a new category for Best British Act.

== 2011 winners ==
- Best Urban Act: Caligrafi Jones
- Best Rock Act: FranKo
- Best Pop Act: Spaceship Days
- Best Dance Act: Anda Adam
- Best International Act: Hannah Trigwell
- Best Music Video: Black Biscuit
- Best Music Website: ReverbNation.com

== 2012 winners ==
- Best Urban Act: Lovita
- Best Rock Act: The IC1s
- Best Pop Act: AnnMarie Fox
- Best Dance Act: KEYMONO
- Best International Act: Sarah Coloso
- Best Music Video: Sarah Coloso
- Best British Act: The IC1s
