= Toranosuke Kobayashi =

Japanese actor (born 1998)

- Born: February 12, 1998 (age 28); Okayama Prefecture, Japan
- Occupation: Actor
- Years active: 2020–present
- Agent: Pin-up Artist

Japanese name
- Kanji: 小林 虎之介
- Hiragana: こばやし とらのすけ
Transcriptions
- Romanization: Kobayashi Toranosūke

Toranosuke Kobayashi (Japanese: 小林 虎之介, romanized: Kobayashi Toranosūke; born February 12, 1998) is a Japanese actor.

== Filmography ==
=== Film ===
Year	Title	Role	Notes	Ref.
2023	My Graduation: Season 4–18 Years Old, Tsumugimasu	Fujii Yamato		
2025	Ikigai	Young volunteer		
2025	Yukikaze	Makoto Kuboki		
2026	Hoshi no Kyoshitsu			

=== Television ===
Year	Title	Role	Notes	Ref.
2021	Edomoiselle	Cameo	Episode 2	
2021	Ken Higuchi's Metropolitan Police Department Violent Crimes Unit	Tatsuro Asano	Episode 2	
2022	Home Tutor	Delinquent role	Episode 2	
2022	Avataro Sentai Donbrothers	Imamura	Episode 22	
2023	Draft King	Naoya Korogi	Episode 1–2	
2023	Worst to First: A Teen Baseball Miracle	Hioki Souma		
2024	PICU: Pediatric Intensive Care Unit	Ren Seto		
2024	Hanasaki Mai Speaks Out	Gen Sakano	Season 3; episode 3	
2024	Double Cheat: False Policeman	Yuma Okada	Season 1; episode 2	
2024	Promise: The Truth of the 16th Year	Tsuyoshi Aso	Episodes 7 and 8	
2024	I Hear the Sunspot	Taichi Sagawa	Lead role	
2024	The Classroom Across the Universe	Gakuto Yanagida		
2025	Inheritance Detective	Masaki Shimada	Episodes 7 and 8	
2025	Koi=Yami	Harumichi Kinoshita		
2025	Since I Took you Away	Daichi Hiiragi	Episodes 6–8	
2025	Murderous Encounter	Harumichi Kinoshita		
2026	Themis's Uncertain Court	Takuro Ezawa	Episode 1	
2026	Yandoku!	Ryuji Okita		
2026	The Woman of the Forensic Science Lab Final	Ryugo Nakatsu		
2026	Nagatan and Ao: Ichika's Cookbook		Season 2	
2026	The Scent of the Wind	Kotaro Takeuchi	Asadora	
2026	Hakone Ekiden: Our Story	Hayato Aoba		

== Awards and nominations ==
Year presented, name of the award ceremony, category, nominee(s) of the award, and the result of the nomination
Year	Award ceremony	Category	Nominated work(s)	Result	Ref.
2025	34th TV Life Annual Drama Awards	Newcomer Award	I Hear the Sunspot	Won	
