= Motoki Nakazawa =

Japanese actor (born 2000)

- Born: February 20, 2000 (age 26); Ibaraki Prefecture, Japan
- Occupation: Actor
- Years active: 2022–present
- Agent: Tristone Entertainment

Japanese name
- Kanji: 中沢元紀
- Hiragana: なかざわ もとき
Transcriptions
- Romanization: Nakazawa Mōtōki

Motoki Nakazawa (中沢 元紀; born February 20, 2000) is a Japanese actor.

== Career ==
Nakazawa made his acting debut in the 2022 mini-drama web series, Maison Haagen-Dazs: Eight Happy Stories.

On September 29, 2023, he made his film debut in the movie The Silent Service. In October of the same year, he attracted attention after portraying the role of ace pitcher Sho Inuzuka in the TBS Sunday television drama Worst to First: A Teen Baseball Miracle.

In July 2024, Nakazawa co-starred with Toranosuke Kobayashi in the TV Tokyo drama, I Hear the Sunspot. In 2025, he is set to appear as Chihiro Yanai in NHK's Asadora television drama Anpan.

== Filmography ==
=== Film ===
Year	Title	Role	Notes	Ref(s)
2023	Goodbye Monotone	Makoto Fujimiya		
2023	The Silent Service	Akira Hiranuma		
2024	Fast Break	Shunto Kusamura	Lead role	
2025	Wind Breaker	Tōma Hiiragi		
2025	Can't Cry with Your Face	Jun'ichi Tazaki		
2027	In My Father's Room	Sota Yokote		

=== Television drama ===
Year	Title	Role	Notes	Ref(s)
2022	NanbaMG5	Ryota Yamada		
2022	Maison Haagen-Dazs: Eight Happy Stories	Cameo	Mini-series; web series	
2022	First Love	Classmate (cameo)	Web series; episodes 1, 5, 6, & 9	
2023	Saitama Host Club	Sen Takasaki		
2023	Worst to First: A Teen Baseball Miracle	Sho Inuzuka		
2024	The Silent Service: The Battle of Tokyo Bay	Akira Hiranuma	Season 1	
2024	What are you doing on Saturday!?	Kotone Fujii (voice)	Lead role; short drama	
2024	366 Days	Tatsuya Takimoto	Episodes 2, 5–9 & final	
2024	I Hear the Sunspot	Kohei Sugihara	Lead role	
2025	Anpan	Chihiro Yanai	Asadora	
2025	Last-resort Investigator	Hayato Tomaru		
2025–26	Strobe Edge	Daiki Korenaga	2 seasons	
2026	Game-Changing	Sota Kusamachi	Lead role	
2026	Brothers in Arms	Oda Nobukatsu	Taiga drama	
2026	Is it Already Time for Sushi?	Nagisa Machiyama		
2026	All Masamune Wants Is Happiness	Masamune Yoshida	Lead role	
