= The Ghost Writer's Wife =

- Genre: Drama
- Written by: Mitsuhiko Fujiki
- Directed by: Naoki Murahashi and others
- Starring: Akari Takaishi; Tommy Bastow; Ryo Yoshizawa; Keiko Kitagawa; Takashi Okabe; Chizuru Ikewaki; Fumiyo Kohinata; Shinichi Tsutsumi
- Narrated by: Eriko Watanabe; Miho Kimura
- Opening theme: "Warattari Korondari" by Humbert Humbert
- Composer: Kensuke Ushio
- Country of origin: Japan
- Original language: Japanese
- No. of episodes: 125

Production
- Producers: Akihiro Tajima; Wataru Suzuki; Yoji Tanaka; Hideaki Kawano
- Running time: 15 minutes
- Production company: NHK

Original release
- Network: NHK General TV
- Release: September 29, 2025 – March 27, 2026

The Ghost Writer's Wife (ばけばけ, Bakebake) is a Japanese television drama series and the 113th Asadora series, following Anpan. This is a work of fiction modeled after the life of Setsu Koizumi, wife of the Greek-Irish writer Lafcadio Hearn, known for works such as Kwaidan: Stories and Studies of Strange Things.

== Plot ==
Toki Matsuno is born into a prestigious samurai family, but the Meiji Restoration brings an end to the age of the samurai. Her father's new business ventures fail, and the family is forced into poverty. She finds a job as a maid to a foreign English teacher named Heavin. Though there are barriers of language and culture between them, they grow close through their shared interest in kaidan (Japanese ghost stories).

== Cast ==
=== Principal ===
- Akari Takaishi as Toki Matsuno
  - Miharu Fukuchi as young Toki
- Tommy Bastow as Lefkada Heavin, Toki's husband

=== Matsuno family ===
- Takashi Okabe as Tsukasanosuke Matsuno, Toki's adoptive father
- Chizuru Ikewaki as Fumi Matsuno, Toki's adoptive mother
- Fumiyo Kohinata as Kan'emon Matsuno, Toki's adoptive grandfather

=== Ushimizu family ===
- Shinichi Tsutsumi as Den Ushimizu, Toki's birth father
- Keiko Kitagawa as Tae Ushimizu, Toki's birth mother
- Rihito Itagaki as Sannojo Ushimizu

=== Others ===
- Ryo Yoshizawa as Yūichi Nishikōri
- Rairu Sugita as Joe Nishikōri
- Kanichiro as Ginjiro Yamane
- Wan Marui as Sawa Nozu
- Honami Sato as Nami
- Shirō Sano as Yasumune Etō, the Governor of Shimane Prefecture
- Kana Kita as Riyo Etō, Yasumune's daughter
- Anna Kurasawa as Chiyo
- Kono Adachi as Sen
- Kenji Iwaya as Zentaro Moriyama, debt collector
- Mizuki Maehara as Zenitaro Moriyama, Zentaro's son
- Katsuhisa Namase as Heita Hanada
- Nobue Iketani as Tsuru Hanada
- Maru Nouchi as Ume
- Udai Iwasaki as Goro Kajitani
- Mayumi Asaka as Tatsu Ueno
- Taisei Sakai as Morimichi Nakamura
- Tokio Emoto as Saiji Yamahashi
- Yukito Hodaka as Seiichi Masaki
- Kyohei Shimokawa as Haruo Kotani
- Charlotte Kate Fox as Eliza Belsland
- Shogo Hama (Note: Hiroya Shimizu was initially cast, but after his arrest for cannabis possession, Shogo Hama took over the role.) as Takichi Shoda
- Hosaki Tanaka as Hatsuemon Kanenari
- Meisha Brooks as Martha, Lefkada Heavin's first wife

=== Voice cast ===
- Eriko Watanabe as the Snake
- Miho Kimura as the Frog

== Production ==
Akari Takaishi was chosen for the lead role of Toki Matsuno from among 2892 auditionees. The role of Toki's husband, Lefkada Heavin, was also filled through an audition rather than a direct offer. The casting call was announced in Japan, as well as in the United States, United Kingdom, Australia, and New Zealand, attracting 1767 participants. Ultimately, British actor Tommy Bastow was selected for the part. He heard about the audition from his co-star on the American TV series Shōgun, Moeka Hoshi.

== TV schedule ==
Week	Episodes	Title	Directed by	Original airdate	Rating
1	1–5	"Bushi-musume, Urameshi." (ブシムスメ、ウラメシ。)	Naoki Murahashi	September 29–October 3, 2025	15.5%
2	6–10	"Muko, Morau, Muzukashi." (ムコ、モラウ、ムズカシ。)	Naoki Murahashi	October 6–10, 2025	14.8%
3	11–15	"Yōkoso, Matsuno-ke e." (ヨーコソ、マツノケヘ。)	Takamasa Izunami	October 13–17, 2025	14.7%
4	16–20	"Futari, Kurasu, Shimasuka?" (フタリ、クラス、シマスカ?)	Hitofumi Matsuoka	October 20–24, 2025	15.2%
5	21–25	"Watashi, Heaven. Matsue, mo, Heaven." (ワタシ、ヘブン。マツエ、モ、ヘブン。)	Naoki Murahashi	October 27–31, 2025	15.4%
6	26–30	"Doko, mo, Jigoku." (ドコ、モ、ジゴク。)	Takamasa Izunami	November 3–7, 2025	14.9%
7	31–35	"Otoki-san, Jochuu, OK?" (オトキサン、ジョチュウ、OK?)	Naoki Murahashi	November 10–14, 2025	15.7%
8	36–40	"Kubi no, Kawa, Ichimai." (クビノ、カワ、イチマイ。)	Hitofumi Matsuoka	November 17–21, 2025	15.9%
9	41–45	"Sukippu, to, Uguisu." (スキップ、ト、ウグイス。)	Takamasa Izunami	November 24–28, 2025	15.7%
10	46–50	"Toori, Sugari." (トオリ、スガリ。)	Hitofumi Matsuoka	December 1–5, 2025	15.8%
11	51–55	"Ganbare, Ojou-sama." (ガンバレ、オジョウサマ。)	Toyo Kojima	December 8–12, 2025	15.7%
12	56–60	"Kaidan, Negaimasu." (カイダン、ネガイマス。)	Takamasa Izunami	December 15–19, 2025	15.8%
13	61–65	"Sanpo, Shimashouka." (サンポ、シマショウカ。)	Naoki Murahashi	December 22–26, 2025	
14	66–70	"Kazoku, Naru, īdesuka?" (カゾク、ナル、イイデスカ？)	Naoki Murahashi	January 5–9, 2026	15.6%
15	71–75	"Matsunoke, yarikata" (マツノケ、ヤリカタ。)	Takamasa Izunami	January 12–16, 2026	15.3%
16	76–80	"Kawa, no, mukō" (カワ、ノ、ムコウ。)	Hitofumi Matsuoka	January 19–23, 2026	15.5%
17	81–85	"Nanto, iuka" (ナント、イウカ。)	Naoki Kobayashi	January 26–30, 2026	15.4%
18	86–90	"Matsue, subarashi." (マツエ、スバラシ。)	Takamasa Izunami	February 2–6, 2026	14.2%
19	91–95	"Wakareru, shimasu." (ワカレル、シマス。)	Naoki Murahashi	February 9–13, 2026	15.0%
20	96–100	"Anta, gata, dokosa." (アンタ、ガタ、ドコサ。)	Naoki Kobayashi	February 16–20, 2026	15.2%
21	101–105	"Kaku, no, hito." (カク、ノ、ヒト。)	Toyo Kojima	February 23–27, 2026	14.4%
22	106–110	"Atarashi, no, jinsei." (アタラシ、ノ、ジンセイ。)	Naoki Kobayashi	March 2–6, 2026	14.7%
23	111–115	"Gobusata, nishikoori-san." (ゴブサタ、ニシコオリサン。)	Naoki Murahashi	March 9–13, 2026	14.7%
24	116–120	"Kaidan, Kaku, shimasu." (カイダン、カク、シマス。)	Takamasa Izunami	March 16–20, 2026	14.8%
25	121–125	"Urameshi, kedo, subarashi." (ウラメシ、ケド、スバラシ。)	Naoki Murahashi	March 23–27, 2026	15.1%
Average rating 15.2% - Rating is based on Japanese Video Research (Kantō region).

== Notes ==
Preceded by Anpan	Asadora; 29 September 2025 – 27 March 2026	Succeeded by The Scent of the Wind
