= Naoko Ken =

Japanese singer and actress (born 1953)

- Born: Naoko Asada (浅田 なを子) (maiden name); Naoko Noguchi (野口 なを子); July 7, 1953 (age 73)
- Origin: Amagiyukashima, Shizuoka, Japan
- Genres: Folk, blues, novelty, enka
- Occupations: Singer, actress, YouTuber
- Instrument: Vocals
- Years active: 1971–present
- Labels: Toho Records; Canyon Records; Pony Canyon; Gauss Entertainment; Unchanged Records
- Website: Official

YouTube information
- Channel: 研ナオコ Naoko Ken
- Years active: 2020 - Present
- Subscribers: 250k
- Views: 91 million
- Last updated: December 27, 2024

Naoko Ken（研 ナオコ, Ken Naoko, born July 7, 1953）is a Japanese singer and actress. She is well known for her comedy roles featuring idiosyncratic looks, and a string of successful torch songs that gained popularity in the late 1970s and early 1980s.

== Biography ==
In 1971, Ken debuted as an enka-oriented singer with a single "Daitokai no Yasagure On'na". In 1975, after the release of several charted singles, she gained the first outstanding commercial success with a song "Guzu", which was written by Ryudo Uzaki and his wife Yoko Aki. "Abayo", a song written by Miyuki Nakajima became the most successful single for Ken, selling more than 600,000 copies. In 1976, the prize-winning song reached number-one spot on the Oricon, Japan's most eminent chart. In addition to the success as a musician, she also obtained popularity as a tarento in the mid 1970s, through her comical acts on multiple TV shows including Kakkurakin Daihousou!!.

After a temporary hiatus in 1977 owing to her arrest on suspicion of possession of marijuana, she returned to the Japanese entertainment industry with the hit tune "Kamome wa Kamome". The melancholic ballad written by Nakajima became known as one of her signature songs, finally sold in excess of 300,000 units. In 1982, she gained huge commercial success as a singer again with a cover version of the Southern All Stars' song "Natsu wo Akiramete", winning several Japanese music prizes. The song is her last top-ten hit solo single so far.

Due to her songs’ popularity, Ken was selected for the annual Kōhaku Uta Gassen every year from 1976 to 1986 except 1977, the year that she went hiatus due to her drug case, and made another return to the prestigious programme on 1993 for her 11th and last appearance so far.

Through her long-term career as a comedic TV personality, she has released several novelty singles with other performers such as Ken Shimura. The song "Natsuzakari Ho no Ji Gumi" recorded with an idol singer Toshihiko Tahara in 1985 is the last top-40 hit single for Ken on the Japanese record charts. To date, her last single was released in 1985.

== Discography ==
=== Singles ===
Year	Single	Chart positions	Label
Year	Single	JP	Label
1971	"Daitokai no Yasagure On'na (大都会のやさぐれ女)" / "Gomen Asobase (御免遊ばせ)"	-	Toho
1972	"Yane no Ue no Komoriuta (屋根の上の子守唄)" / "B to Iu Snack (Bというスナック)"	-	Toho
1972	"Futari de Miru Yume (二人で見る夢)" / "Chiisana Negai (小さな願い)"	-	Toho
1972	"Kyoto no On'na no Ko (京都の女の子)" / "Boy Friend (ボーイフレンド)"	52	Toho
1972	"Kon'nichiwa Otoko no Ko (こんにちわ男の子)" / "Nani wo Shiyoukana (何をしようかな)"	-	Toho
1973	"On'na Gokoro no Tango (女心のタンゴ)" /"Tsuki ga Noboreba (月がのぼれば)"	59	Toho
1973	"Uwasa no Otoko (うわさの男)" / "Nageki no Blue Lady (嘆きのブルーレディ)"	60	Toho
1974	"Dai 3 no On'na (第三の女)" / "Uchi e Oide (家へおいで)"	-	Canyon
1975	"Guzu (愚図)" / "Sayonara wa Kirai na Kotoba (サヨナラは嫌いな言葉)"	9	Canyon
1976	"Ichinensou (一年草)" / "Bashamichi (馬車道)"	28	Canyon
1976	"La La La" / "Ame ga Sora wo Suteru Hi wa (雨が空を捨てる日は)"	28	Canyon
1976	"Abayo (あばよ)" / "Tsuyogari wa Yose yo (強がりはよせよ)"	1	Canyon
1977	"Kaze wo Kuratte (風をくらって)" / "Ijippari (意地っぱり)"	14	Canyon
1977	"Oh Kamisama (オゝ神様)" / "Blues"	43	Canyon
1977	"Furarete Yatusa (ふられてやるさ)" / "Yakou Ressha (夜行列車)"	35	Canyon
1978	"Kamome wa Kamome (かもめはかもめ)" / "Furareta Kibun de (ふられた気分で)"	7	Canyon
1978	"Mado Glass (窓ガラス)" / "Sayonara wo Tsutaete (さよならを伝えて)"	8	Canyon
1978	"Minikui Ahiru no Ko (みにくいあひるの子, The Ugly Duckling)" /"Konuka Ame (こぬか雨)"	17	Canyon
1979	"Kuchibeni wo Fukitore (口紅をふきとれ)" /"Ai no Kassai (愛の喝采)"	55	Canyon
1979	"Hi wa Nobori Hi wa Shizumi (陽は昇り 陽は沈み)" /"Goodbye"	33	Canyon
1979	"Ai wo Mou Ichido (愛をもう一度)" /"Natsukashii Asa (なつかしい朝)"	-	Canyon
1979	"Hitoripocchi de Odorasete (ひとりぽっちで踊らせて)" /"Uminari (海鳴り)"	39	Canyon
1980	"Kuchiguse (くちぐせ)" /"Irusu (居留守)"	31	Canyon
1980	"Suna no Fune (砂の舟)" /"Kuuchuu Buranko (空中ブランコ)"	-	Canyon
1980	"Yumemakura (夢枕)" /"Bravo-Bravo"	91	Canyon
1981	"Minaide (見ないで)" /"Mou... Mou... (もう...もう...)"	-	Canyon
1981	"Wakare no Tasogare (別離の黄昏)" /"Shigurete (時雨れて)"	-	Canyon
1981	"Bossa Nova (ボサノバ)" /"Shushifu (秋止符)"	69	Canyon
1982	"Natsu wo Akiramete (夏をあきらめて)" /"Ima wa Blues (今はブルース)"	5	Canyon
1982	"Furareta Kibun (ふられた気分)" /"Omoide Gawa (おもいで河)"	53	Canyon
1983	"Lonely Way" /"Koi no Senaka (恋の背中)"	-	Canyon
1983	"Ai, Douja Koi, Douja (愛、どうじゃ。恋、どうじゃ。)" /"Lonely Star"	71	Canyon
1983	"Nakasete (泣かせて)" / "Tabidatsu Otoko (旅立つ男)"	41	Canyon
1984	"Yoru ni Aozamete (夜に蒼ざめて)" / "Don't Cry My Heart"	-	Canyon
1984	"Meigaza (名画座)" / "Tokyo Bijin (東京美人)"	-	Canyon
1984	"Roppongi Rain (六本木レイン)" / "Give Me Blues"	78	Canyon
1985	"Kishū (帰愁)" / "On'na Tomodachi (女友達)"	-	Canyon
1986	"Tokyo Mikaeri Bijin (Tokyo見返り美人)" / "Hoshiyoubi ni Aitaine (星曜日に会いたいね)"	73	Canyon
1987	"Ame no Hi no Eigakan (雨の日の映画館)" / "Etranger"	-	Canyon
1987	"Uramado Twilight (裏窓トワイライト)" / "Koyoi, Shibaura, Melancholy (今宵、芝浦、メランコリー)"	-	Canyon
1989	"Fuyu no Cattleya Kaigan (冬のカトレア海岸)" / "Gin no Hari (銀の針)"	-	Pony Canyon
1992	"Kanashii On'na (悲しい女)" / "Kirei ni Naritai (綺麗になりたい)"	-	Pony Canyon
1993	"Maigo (迷子)" / "Off"	-	Pony Canyon
1993	"Mary Jane" / "Half Moon"	-	Pony Canyon
1994	"Hanabi (花火)" / "Doukeshi (道化師)"	-	Pony Canyon
1995	"Waltz (ワルツ)" / "Silk no Umi (SILKの海)"	-	Pony Canyon
2019	"Watashi wa Naiteimasu (私は泣いています)" / "Ai (愛)"	-	Unchanged

==== Collaboration singles ====
Year	Single	Chart positions	Additional information	Label
Year	Single	JP	Additional information	Label
1985	"Natsuzakari Ho no Ji Gumi (夏ざかりほの字組)" / "Vacance Game (バカンス・ゲーム)" (with Toshihiko Tahara)	5	Credit to "Toshi and Naoko"	Canyon
1992	"Hanashi ga Chigaujanai (話が違うじゃない)" / "Kiyoku Tadashiku Utsukushiku (清く 正しく 美しく)" (with the Lilacs)	91	Credited to "Naoko and Lilacs"	Pony Canyon
2001	"Ginza Atari de Gin! Gin! Gin! (銀座あたりで ギン!ギン!ギン!)" / "Love Tokyo Night" (with Ken Shimura)	41	Credited to "Ken♂♀Ken"; Produced by Tsunku	Pony Canyon
2004	"Koi Suredo Shanana (恋すれどシャナナ)" (with Toshihiko Tahara)	123		Gauss Entertainment

=== Albums ===
==== Studio albums ====
Title	Album details	Peak chart positions
Title	Album details	JPN Oricon
On-na Gokoro (女ごころ)	Released: 1973; Label: Touhou; Formats: LP, Cassette Tape, CD	-
Dai-San no On-na (第三の女)	Released: 1974; Label: Touhou; Formats: LP, Cassette Tape, CD	-
Guzu (愚図)	Released: 1975; Label: Canyon; Formats: LP, Cassette Tape, CD	-
Nakiwarai (泣き笑い)	Released: 1976; Label: Canyon; Formats: LP, Cassette Tape, CD	-
Kamome no You ni (かもめのように)	Released: 1977; Label: Canyon; Formats: LP, Cassette Tape, CD	-
Ken Naoko, Nakajima Miyuki wo Utau (研ナオコ、中島みゆきを歌う)	Released: 1978; Label: Canyon; Formats: LP, Cassette Tape, CD	-
Naoko VS Aku Yu	Released: 1979; Label: Canyon; Formats: LP, Cassette Tape, CD	-
Akireta Otoko Tachi (あきれた男たち)	Released: 1980; Label: Canyon; Formats: LP, Cassette Tape, CD	-
Renairon (恋愛論)	Released: 1981; Label: Canyon; Formats: LP, Cassette Tape, CD	-
Naoko Mistone	Released: 1983; Label: Canyon; Formats: LP, Cassette Tape, CD	-
Standard ni Kanashikute (スタンダードに悲しくて)	Released: 1983; Label: Canyon; Formats: LP, Cassette Tape, CD	-
Again	Released: 1984; Label: Canyon; Formats: LP, Cassette Tape, CD	-
Meigaza (名画座)	Released: 1984; Label: Canyon; Formats: LP, Cassette Tape, CD	-
Deep	Released: 1985; Label: Canyon; Formats: LP, Cassette Tape, CD	-
Deep	Released: 1989; Label: Pony Canyon; Formats: Cassette Tape, CD	-
RE-Naoko: Kanashii Onna (悲しい女)	Released: 1992; Label: Pony Canyon; Formats: Cassette Tape, CD	-
Ago: Ano Koro he Love Letter (あの頃へラブレター)	Released: 1992; Label: Pony Canyon; Formats: CD	-
Long Live Live Yayoi (弥生)	Released: 2008; Label: unchanged; Formats: CD	-
Ichizu (一途)	Released: 2011; Label: unchanged; Formats: CD	-
Ame Nochi Hare Tokidoki Namida (雨のち晴れ、ときどき涙)	Released: 2015; Label: King; Formats: CD	-

==== Compilations ====
Title	Album details	Peak chart positions
Title	Album details	JPN Oricon
Sono Michi Original 14 (その道・オリジナル14)	Released: 1975; Label: Touhou; Formats: LP, Cassette Tape	-
Ken Naoko (研ナオコ)	Released: 1976; Label: Pony; Formats: Cassette Tape	-
Ken Naoko Original Best Hit Kuroi Namida (研ナオコ オリジナル・ベスト・ヒット 黒いなみだ)	Released: 1977; Label: Canyon; Formats: LP, Cassette Tape	-
Ken Naoko Original Best Hit (研ナオコ オリジナル・ベスト・ヒット)	Released: 1977; Label: Canyon; Formats: LP, Cassette Tape	-
Aitsu no Inai Yoru Ken Naoko Original Best Collection (あいつのいない夜 研ナオコ ベスト・コレクション)	Released: 1980; Label: Canyon; Formats: CD, LP, Cassette Tape	-
Meguriai (めぐりあい)	Released: 1982; Label: Canyon; Formats: CD, LP, Cassette Tape	-
Best Selection	Released: 1984; Label: Canyon; Formats: CD, LP, Cassette Tape	-
Ken Naoko The Special Series (研ナオコ THE SPECIAL SERIES)	Released: 1985; Label: Canyon; Formats: CD, LP, Cassette Tape	-
Ken Naoko The Best (研ナオコ THE BEST)	Released: 1985; Label: Canyon; Formats: CD, LP, Cassette Tape	-
Super Best	Released: 1986; Label: Pony; Formats: CD, LP, Cassette Tape	-
Non Stop Ken Naoko (NON STOP 研ナオコ)	Released: 1986; Label: Pony; Formats: CD, LP, Cassette Tape	-
Ken Naoko Best (研ナオコ ベスト)	Released: 1987; Label: Pony; Formats: CD, LP, Cassette Tape	-
Naoko Sings Ballads	Released: 1987; Label: Pony Canyon; Formats: CD, LP, Cassette Tape	-
Ken Naoko Best Hits: Memories (研ナオコ BEST HITS〜Memories〜)	Released: 1988; Label: Pony Canyon; Formats: CD, LP, Cassette Tape	-
Ken Naoko Best Collection (研ナオコ ベストコレクション)	Released: 1990; Label: Pony Canyon; Formats: CD, Cassette Tape	-
Ken Naoko Special Best (研ナオコ スペシャルベスト)	Released: 1992; Label: Pony Canyon; Formats: CD, Cassette Tape	-
Ken Naoko Best Collection: Hanabi (研ナオコ ベストコレクション -花火-)	Released: 1994; Label: Pony Canyon; Formats: CD	-
My Classics	Released: 1998; Label: Pony Canyon; Formats: CD	-
Anthology Ken Naoko Best (Anthology 研ナオコ BEST)	Released: 2003; Label: Pony Canyon; Formats: CD	-
Ken Naoko Meikyoku Zenshuu Singles Perfect Selection (研ナオコ 名曲全集 Singles Perfect Selection)	Released: 2004; Label: Pony Canyon; Formats: CD	-
LOVE LIFE LIVE Vol.1: 35th Anniversary	Released: 2006; Label: Unchanged; Formats: CD	-
Best Collection 32 (ベスト・コレクション32)	Released: 2008; Label: Pony Canyon; Formats: CD	-
Single A-Side Complete (シングルA面コンプリート)	Released: 2013; Label: Pony Canyon; Formats: CD	-
Cover Sakuhin Collection (カバー作品コレクション)	Released: 2013; Label: Pony Canyon; Formats: CD	-
Single B-Side Complete (シングルB面コンプリート)	Released: 2014; Label: Pony Canyon; Formats: CD	-
Nakajima Miyuki Sakuhin Complete (中島みゆき作品コンプリート)	Released: 2014; Label: Pony Canyon; Formats: CD	-
Platinum Best Ken Naoko Single&Cover Collection (プラチナムベスト 研ナオコ シングル&カバーコレクション)	Released: 2015; Label: Pony Canyon; Formats: CD	-
All Time Best (オールタイム・ベスト)	Released: 2023; Label: Pony Canyon; Formats: CD	-

==== Box sets ====
Title	Album details	Peak chart positions
Title	Album details	JPN Oricon
Ken Naoko: Miryoku no Subete (研ナオコ 〜魅力のすべて〜)	Released: 2011; Label: Pony Canyon; Formats: 5-CDs	-

== Filmography ==
=== Film ===
Year	Title	Role	Notes	Ref.
2025	Wash Away	Norie Isogai	Lead role	

=== Television ===
Year	Title	Role	Notes	Ref.
2026	The Scent of the Wind	Maji / narrator	Asadora	
2026	Plastic Beauty			

== Kōhaku Uta Gassen Appearances ==
Year	#	Song	No.	VS	Remarks
1976 (Showa 51)/27th	1	LA-LA-LA	9/24	Aoi Teruhiko	
1978 (Showa 53)/29th	2	Kamome Wa Kamome (かもめはかもめ)	4/24	Goro Noguchi	
1979 (Showa 54)/30th	3	Hitori Pocchide Odorasete (ひとりぽっちで踊らせて)	11/23	Takashi Hosokawa	
1980 (Showa 55)/31st	4	Yumemakura (夢枕)	13/23	Yūzō Kayama	
1981 (Showa 56)/32nd	5	Bosanoba (ボサノバ)	16/22	Ryuu Tetsuya	
1982 (Showa 57)/33rd	6	Natsu Wo Akiramete (夏をあきらめて)	8/22	Sugawara Youichi	
1983 (Showa 58)/34th	7	Nakasete (泣かせて)	18/21	Sugawara Youichi (2)& Shiruiya	
1984 (Showa 59)/35th	8	Meigaza (名画座)	5/20	Yamamoto Jyouji	
1985 (Showa 60)/36th	9	Kishuu (帰愁)	9/20	Haruo Minami	
1986 (Showa 61)/37th	10	Tokyo Mikaeribijin (Tokyo見返り美人)	8/21	Shibugakitai	
1993 (Heisei 5)/44th	11	Kamome Wa Kamome (2)	15/26	Kaientai	Returned after 7 years
