= I Hear the Sunspot =

Japanese manga series by Yuki Fumino

- First collected volume cover

ひだまりが聴こえる (Hidamari ga Kikoeru)
- Genre: Boys' love
- Manga
- Written by: Yuki Fumino
- Published by: France Shoin
- English publisher: NA: One Peace Books
- Imprint: Canna Comics
- Magazine: Canna
- Original run: December 22, 2013 – present
- Volumes: 7
- Live-action film
- Directed by: Daisuke Kamijō
- Written by: Natsuko Takahashi
- Music by: Nobuhiko Morino
- Studio: Booster Project
- Released: June 24, 2017
- Television drama
- Directed by: Fūga Yaegashi; Shō Makino; Takanobu Harashima
- Written by: Izumi Kawasaki
- Licensed by: GagaOOLala
- Original network: U-Next; TV Tokyo
- Original run: July 4, 2024 – September 19, 2024
- Episodes: 12

I Hear the Sunspot (Japanese: ひだまりが聴こえる, Hepburn: Hidamari ga Kikoeru) is a Japanese manga series by Yuki Fumino. I Hear the Sunspot is serialized in the semi-monthly boys' love manga anthology Canna since December 22, 2013.

A live-action film adaptation of the first volume was released on June 24, 2017. A separate live-action television drama adaptation was broadcast on TV Tokyo from July 4, 2024, to September 19, 2024, and won the My Best TV Award in the 62nd Galaxy Award.

== Plot ==
College student Taichi Sagawa learns that his lonely classmate, Kohei Sugihara, is deaf, and he enrolls in a part-time job to take notes for him in exchange for food. As the two become more acquainted with each other, they develop a strong friendship that eventually turns into love.

== Characters ==
Kohei Sugihara (杉原 航平, Sugihara Kōhei)
Voiced by: Makoto Furukawa (audio drama)
Portrayed by: Hideya Tawada (film), Motoki Nakazawa (TV drama)
Kohei is a college student who had a sudden hearing loss in high school, and because of his disability, he struggles to fit in and is usually seen alone.
Taichi Sagawa (佐川 太一, Sagawa Taichi)
Voiced by: Junya Enoki (audio drama)
Portrayed by: Akira Onodera (film), Toranosuke Kobayashi (TV drama)
Taichi is an optimistic and outgoing college student who takes on the job of taking notes for Kohei part-time in exchange for food.
Yoko (ヨコ)
Voiced by: Yoshiki Nakajima (audio drama)
Portrayed by: Ryo Mitsuya (film)

== Media ==
=== Manga ===
I Hear the Sunspot is written and illustrated by Yuki Fumino as her debut work. Fumino came up with the idea of writing about the hearing impaired from being around friends and acquaintances who had a hearing disability. She wrote I Hear the Sunspot based on what she learned from them as well as visiting a sign language school.

I Hear the Sunspot was serialized in the semi-monthly BL manga anthology Canna from December 22, 2013 to August 2014. Originally released as a single-volume story, it was followed up with I Hear the Sunspot: Theory of Happiness from April 22, 2015 to February 2016. After the story's end, Fumino continued with a third series, titled I Hear the Sunspot: Limit, from October 2016 to December 2019. A fourth series titled I Hear the Sunspot: Four Seasons began publication in December 2020 and is still ongoing. The chapters have been released in 7 bound volumes by France Shoin under the Canna Comics imprint as of April 2023.

One Peace Books publishes I Hear the Sunspot in English for North American distribution.

No.	Title	Original release date	English release date
1	I Hear the Sunspot; Hidamari ga Kikoeru (ひだまりが聴こえる)	October 27, 2014; 978-4-8296-8561-7	August 15, 2017; 978-1-9449-3730-0
Chapters 1-5; The Journey Continues
2	I Hear the Sunspot: Theory of Happiness; Hidamari ga Kikoeru: Kōfukuron (ひだまりが聴こえる-幸福論-)	May 27, 2016; 978-4-8296-8580-8	February 13, 2018; 978-1-9449-3741-6
Chapters 1-6 [Chapters 6-11]; That Feeling
3	I Hear the Sunspot: Limit Volume 1 Hidamari ga Kikoeru: Rimitto 1 (ひだまりが聴こえる－リミット－1)	October 27, 2017; 978-4-8296-8599-0	November 20, 2018; 978-1-6427-3004-3
Chapters 1-5 [Chapters 12-16]; Way Back When
4	I Hear the Sunspot: Limit Volume 2 Hidamari ga Kikoeru: Rimitto 2 (ひだまりが聴こえる－リミット－2)	December 27, 2018; 978-4-8296-8615-7	September 17, 2019; 978-1-6427-3028-9
Chapters 6-10 [Chapters 17-21]; Winter of Freshman Year
5	I Hear the Sunspot: Limit Volume 3 Hidamari ga Kikoeru: Rimitto 3 (ひだまりが聴こえる－リミット－3)	May 28, 2020; 978-4-8296-8633-1	April 13, 2021; 978-1-6427-3103-3
Chapters 11-15 [Chapters 22-26]; Afterglow; Gift
6	I Hear the Sunspot: Four Seasons Volume 1 Hidamari ga Kikoeru: Shunkashūtō 1 (ひだまりが聴こえる－春夏秋冬－1)	December 28, 2021; 978-4-8296-8659-1	April 18, 2023; 978-1-6427-3233-7
Chapters 1-5 [Chapters 27-31]; Transparent; Never-Ending Summer
7	Hidamari ga Kikoeru: Shunkashūtō 2 (ひだまりが聴こえる－春夏秋冬－2)	April 28, 2023; 978-4-8296-8674-4	July 2, 2024; 978-1-64273-335-8
Chapters 6-10 [Chapters 32-36]; My Little Tears
8	Hidamari ga Kikoeru: Shunkashūtō 3 (ひだまりが聴こえる－春夏秋冬－3)	May 30, 2024; 978-4-8296-8674-4	June 5, 2025; 978-1-64273-445-4

=== Film ===
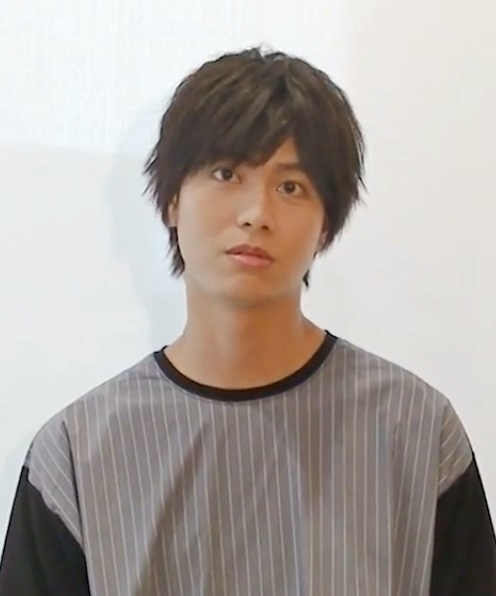
Hideya Tawada (pictured in 2018) portrayed Kohei in the film.

A live-action film adaptation of I Hear the Sunspot was announced through the physical release of the first volume on the wrap-around band. The film starred Hideya Tawada as Kohei and Akira Onodera as Taichi. Ryo Mitsuya was later cast as Yoko. Additional cast members included Ami Yamazaki, Miyū Ōsaka, Hiroe Igeta, Rima Matsuda, Yūki Fukumoto, Tsubasa Shimada, Hideyuki Araki, Anna Kijima, Suzuno Nomura, Norihisa Hiranuma, Shinshō Nakamura, and Reiko Takashima. The film was directed by Daisuke Kamijō. It was released on June 24, 2017.

=== Television drama ===
A live-action television drama adaptation was announced on May 28, 2024. The series premiered its first episode on U-Next on June 26, 2024. It was then being broadcast from July 4, 2024, to September 19, 2024, for 12 episodes on TV Tokyo as part of their Drama Next programming block. (Note: TV Tokyo lists the broadcast date as July 3, 2024, at 24:30, which is July 4, 2024, at 12:30 a.m.) The series stars Motoki Nakazawa as Kohei and Toranosuke Kobayashi as Taichi. It is directed by Fūga Yaegashi, Shō Makino, and Takanobu Harashima, with screenplay written by Izumi Kawasaki. In 2025, the series won the My Best TV Award in the 19th Grand Prix of the 62nd Galaxy Award.

No.	Title	Directed by	Written by	Original release date
1	"Being Unable to Hear Isn't Your Fault"; Transliteration: "Kikoenai no wa, Omae no Sei Janai Daro" (Japanese: 聴こえないのは、お前のせいじゃないだろ)	Fūga Yaegashi	Izumi Kawasaki	June 26, 2024 (premiere); July 4, 2024 (television broadcast)
2	"I No Longer Have a Place For Myself Close Over There"; Transliteration: "Mukō Soba ni, Mō Ore no Ibasho wa Nai" (Japanese: 向こう側に、もう俺の居場所はない)	Shō Makino	Izumi Kawasaki	July 11, 2024
3	"If I Could Only Have the Person That's Important to Me Understand"; Transliteration: "Daiji na Hito ni Dake, Wakatte Moraeba" (Japanese: 大事な人にだけ、わかってもらえれば)	Shō Makino	Izumi Kawasaki	July 18, 2024
4	"I Don't Want to Become Unable to Hear That Voice"; Transliteration: "Ano Koe ga Kikoenaku Naru no wa, Iya da na" (Japanese: あの声が聴こえなくなるのは、嫌だな)	Fūga Yaegashi	Izumi Kawasaki	July 25, 2024
5	"Scary Things Over Being Unable to Hear"; Transliteration: "Kikoenaku Naru Yori, Kowai Koto" (Japanese: 聴こえなくなるより、怖いこと)	Fūga Yaegashi	Izumi Kawasaki	August 1, 2024
6	"About to Melt From a Kiss Again"; Transliteration: "Mata, Kisu Tokasarechau yo" (Japanese: また、キスとかされちゃうよ)	Fūga Yaegashi	Izumi Kawasaki	August 8, 2024
7	"Even When I'm Not Here Anymore"; Transliteration: "Mō, Ore ga Inakute mo" (Japanese: もう、俺がいなくても)	Takanobu Harashima	Izumi Kawasaki	August 15, 2024
8	"I Don't Want Anyone Other Than You, Taichi"; Transliteration: "Taichi Igai no Hito ja, Iya Dakara" (Japanese: 太一以外の人じゃ、いやだから)	Takanobu Harashima	Izumi Kawasaki	August 22, 2024
9	"When We Laugh the Same at the Same Things"; Transliteration: "Onnaji Koto de Onnaji ni Waraetara" (Japanese: 同じことで同じように笑えたら)	Shō Makino	Izumi Kawasaki	August 29, 2024
10	"If I Told You I Was Quitting School, What Would You Do?"; Transliteration: "Ore ga Gakkō Yameru tte Ottara, Dō Suru?" (Japanese: 俺が学校やめるって言ったら、どうする?)	Shō Makino	Izumi Kawasaki	September 5, 2024
11	"Thanks For Taking Notes for Me Up Until Now"; Transliteration: "Ima Made de Nōtoteiku Shite Kurete Arigatō" (Japanese: 今までノートテイクしてくれてありがとう)	Fūga Yaegashi	Izumi Kawasaki	September 12, 2024
12	"No Matter How Many Times, Until I Send Everything to You"; Transliteration: "Nando Demo, Zenbu Omae ni Todoku Made" (Japanese: 何度でも、全部お前に届くまで)	Fūga Yaegashi	Izumi Kawasaki	September 19, 2024

== Reception ==
Rebecca Silverman from Anime News Network reviewed I Hear the Sunspot favorably, praising its exploration of school stereotypes and Kohei and Taichi's relationship. Regarding Theory of Happiness, she described it as being "sweet and thoughtful" and praised the art, but she also stated that it had "excessive" angst. For Limit, Silverman praised the story's exploration of "different lived experiences of being 'normal'". The Journal of Anime and Manga Studies described Kohei as an example of how people with disabilities and queer identities are seen as outsiders in Japanese society.

At San Diego Comic-Con in 2018, I Hear the Sunspot was selected as an "under-appreciated gem" at a panel composed of manga critics and industry insiders. I Hear the Sunspot was selected by visitors of the website Nijimen as one of the best boys' love manga for newcomers to the genre. It was included in 2018 list of Great Graphic Novels for Teens produced by American Library Association's Young Adult Library Services Association.

In Japan, volume 1 of Limit ranked at no. 45 on Oricon and sold 16,833 physical copies in its first week of sales. Volume 2 of Limit ranked at no. 31 on Oricon and sold 20,128 physical copies in its first week of sales.
