= Juri Kosaka =

Japanese actress

- 上坂 樹里
- Born: July 14, 2005 (age 21); Kanagawa Prefecture, Japan
- Occupations: Actress; model
- Years active: 2018–present
- Agent: Avex Management

Juri Kosaka (上坂 樹里, Kōsaka Juri; born July 14, 2005) is a Japanese actress and model.

== Career ==
Kosaka passed the audition to become an exclusive model for the fashion magazine Seventeen on her fourth attempt in 2021. She later made her acting debut, and in 2025, she was selected for the lead role in the Asadora (morning drama) The Scent of the Wind after winning an audition that attracted 2,410 applicants.

== Filmography ==
=== Television ===
| Year | Title | Role | Notes | Ref. |
|---|---|---|---|---|
| 2022 | Heroine Tanjo! Asadora na Onna-tachi | Tanie Kitabayashi | Lead role; episode 2 | |
| 2024 | Billion x School | Himeka Umeno | | |
| 2024 | Nursing Aide At Your Side | Kasumi Arikawa | Episode 7 | |
| 2025 | Mr. Mikami's Classroom | Tazune Shinonome | | |
| 2025 | Someday, Into Zero-Gravity Space | Hikari Hibino (young) | | |
| 2026 | The Scent of the Wind | Naomi Oya | Lead role; Asadora | |

=== Film ===
| Year | Title | Role | Notes | Ref. |
|---|---|---|---|---|
| 2025 | Romantic Killer | Saki Takamine | | |
| 2026 | Yamaguchi-kun Isn't So Bad | Honoka Waku | | |
| 2027 | Irresistible I Love You | Sena Kodama | Lead role | |
