= Yamaguchi-kun Isn't So Bad =

Japanese manga series

- First tankōbon volume cover

山口くんはワルくない (Yamaguchi-kun wa Warukunai)
- Genre: Romance
- Manga
- Written by: Yuu Saiki
- Published by: Kodansha
- English publisher: NA: Kodansha USA (digital)
- Imprint: Kodansha Comics Betsufure
- Magazine: Bessatsu Friend
- Original run: September 13, 2019 – present
- Volumes: 13
- Live-action film
- Directed by: Kentarō Moriya
- Written by: Natsuko Takahashi
- Music by: Kōji Endō
- Studio: Asmik Ace
- Released: June 5, 2026
- icon

Yamaguchi-kun Isn't So Bad (Japanese: 山口くんはワルくない, Hepburn: Yamaguchi-kun wa Warukunai) is a Japanese manga series written and illustrated by Yuu Saiki. It has been serialized in Kodansha's shōjo manga magazine Bessatsu Friend since September 2019. A live-action film adaptation premiered in Japanese theaters in June 2026.

== Characters ==
Asuka Yamaguchi (山口飛鳥, Yamaguchi Asuka)
Portrayed by: Kyohei Takahashi (Naniwa Danshi)
Satsuki Shinohara (篠原皐, Shinohara Satsuki)
Portrayed by: Hikaru Takahashi
Rion Ishizaki (石崎琳央, Ishizaki Rion)
Portrayed by: Yoji Iwase
Honoka Waku (Waku Honoka)
Portrayed by: Juri Kōsaka
Kotone Suzuki (Suzuki Kotone)
Portrayed by: Amane Uehara
Erii Morimiya (Morimiya Erii)
Portrayed by: Hinami Mori
Shio Kimura (Kimura Shio)
Portrayed by: Kanade Imahori
Aki Nonaka (Nonaka Aki)
Portrayed by: Leo Nagaoka
Ichi Maezawa (Maezawa Ichi)
Portrayed by: Jōtarō
Ichika Teshigahara (Ichika Teshigahara)
Portrayed by: Moka Otsuka
Homeroom Teacher
Portrayed by: Shigehiro Yamaguchi
Yamaguchi's grandfather
Portrayed by: Shihō Harumi
Yamaguchi's grandmother
Portrayed by: Eri Fuse

== Media ==
=== Manga ===
Written and illustrated by Yuu Saiki, Yamaguchi-kun Isn't So Bad started in Kodansha's shōjo manga magazine Bessatsu Friend on September 13, 2019. The manga went on hiatus in June 2022 due to Saiki's childbirth, and resumed on July 13, 2023. Kodansha has collected its chapters into individual tankōbon volumes. The first volume was released on January 10, 2020. As of June 12, 2026, thirteen volumes have been released.

In July 2021, Kodansha USA announced that they have licensed the manga for English digital release in North America.

==== Volumes ====
No.	Original release date	Original ISBN	English release date	English ISBN
1	January 10, 2020	978-4-06-518241-3	August 10, 2021	978-1-63699-291-4
1. "See Ya Tomorrow"; 2. "You Are Too Funny"; 3. "That Took You By Surprise, Didn't It?"; 4. "It Drives Me Nuts!"
2	June 11, 2020	978-4-06-519934-3	September 14, 2021	978-1-63699-356-0
5. "You're Right"; 6. "What Should I Do?"; 7. "Are You Listening?"; 8. "No, It's Not That"
3	October 13, 2020	978-4-06-520981-3	October 12, 2021	978-1-63699-408-6
9. "Me Too"; 10. "It Wasn't Sudden"; 11. "Something Like That"; 12. "To Be Honest"
4	March 12, 2021	978-4-06-522481-6	November 9, 2021	978-1-63858-260-1
13. "I Can't Take It Anymore"; 14. "I've Been Thinking About It"; 15. "Oh My Gosh"; 16. "That's Not What I Meant"
5	August 12, 2021	978-4-06-524289-6	December 14, 2021	978-1-63858-668-5
17. "It's Hard, You Know"; 18. "You're Acting Weird Today"; 19. "Say Something"; 20. "Stop"
6	January 13, 2022	978-4-06-526438-6	June 13, 2022	978-1-63858-903-7
21. "It's Just A Coincidence, Isn't It?"; 22. "That's Enough!!"; 23. "I'm Not Mad"; 24. "You're Sure Anything Is Okay?"
7	June 13, 2022	978-4-06-528023-2	December 13, 2022	979-8-88843-113-9
25. "You Never Know What I'm Gonna Do"; 26. "That's More Embarrassing"; 27. "You Should Let It Show"; 28. "I Can't Concentrate"
8	November 13, 2023	978-4-06-533670-0	April 30, 2024	979-8-88933-451-4
29. "I Can't Keep My Anger Under Control"; 30. "You're So Cool"; 31. "I Can't Help Smiling..."; 32. "Nobody's Looking At Us"
9	July 11, 2024	978-4-06-536187-0	December 17, 2024	979-8-89478-304-8
33. "Let Me Explain"; 34. "Do You Wanna Do It?"; 35. "Absolutely Not"; 36. "Be Ready For It!"; Special Short Episode: Let's Make This A Great New Year Together
10	December 13, 2024	978-4-06-537800-7	May 20, 2025	979-8-89478-524-0
37. "That's Enough"; 38. "Same as Usual"; 39. "Isn't that Crazy?"; 40. "It's so Hard to Endure..."
11	June 13, 2025	978-4-06-539886-9	October 21, 2025	979-8-89478-730-5
41. "I Wanna Go Somewhere"; 42. "That's Awesome!"; 43. "Silly!"; 44. "Plop"
12	December 12, 2025	978-4-06-541720-1	April 21, 2026	979-8-89830-071-5
45. "...What Is This?!"; 46. "Hmm, I Don't Get It"; 47. "You're so Cute"; 48. "I Wanna Do It"
13	June 12, 2026	978-4-06-543808-4	—	—

=== Live-action film ===
A live-action film adaptation was announced on December 6, 2025. It will be produced by Asmik Ace and directed by Saiji Yakumo, with Natsuko Takahashi writing the script and Kōji Endō composing the music. Asmik Ace distributed the film and premiered in Japanese theaters on June 5, 2026. The theme song is "Be My Baby" performed by Naniwa Danshi.

== Reception ==
The series was among the top five manga in the women's category of Comic CMoa's Electronic Comic Awards 2022.
