= The Scent of the Wind =

- Genre: Drama
- Written by: Tomoko Yoshizawa
- Directed by: Yoshiharu Sasaki and others
- Starring: Ai Mikami; Juri Kosaka; Masaya Sano; Erika Ikuta; Shouma Kai; Toranosuke Kobayashi; Chika Uchida; Miu Hayasaka; Kisetsu Fujiwara; Mikako Tabe; Taizo Harada; Miki Mizuno; Bando Yajuro; Kazuki Kitamura; Yukie Nakama
- Narrated by: Naoko Ken
- Opening theme: "Kaze to Machi" by Mrs. Green Apple
- Composer: Yuji Nomi
- Country of origin: Japan
- Original language: Japanese

Production
- Producers: Yuya Kasai; Kyosuke Matsuda
- Running time: 15 minutes
- Production company: NHK

Original release
- Network: NHK General TV
- Release: March 30 – September 25, 2026

The Scent of the Wind (風、薫る, Kaze, Kaoru) is a Japanese television drama series and the 114th Asadora series, following The Ghost Writer's Wife. The two protagonists are modeled after Chika Ozeki and Masa Suzuki, but their names have been changed as the series was produced as a work of fiction.

== Plot ==
As Japan entered the new era of the Meiji period, the country began embracing various aspects of Western culture. One of these introductions was the concept of the "Trained Nurse." Rin Ichinose and Naomi Oya become pioneers in this field. As they grapple with the complexities of interacting with patients and doctors, the two frequently clash and struggle. However, through these challenges, they grow together—eventually evolving into the ultimate "buddy" duo.

== Cast ==
=== Principal ===
- Ai Mikami as Rin Ichinose
- Juri Kosaka as Naomi Oya

=== Ichinose family ===
- Kazuki Kitamura as Shin'emon Ichinose, Rin's father
- Miki Mizuno as Mitsu Ichinose, Rin's mother
- Miu Hayasaka as Yasu Ichinose, Rin's sister
- Shuhei Uesugi as Shuichi Makimura, Yasu's husband
- Takashi Kobayashi as Yoshimasa Nakamura
- Nanami Taki as Tamaki, Rin and Kamekichi's daughter
  - Uta Yamada as Tamaki (10 years old)
  - Ema as Tamaki (4 to 7 years old)
  - Ruka Miyajima as Tamaki (3 years old)

=== The people of Tochigi ===
- Toranosuke Kobayashi as Kotaro Takeuchi
- Shiro Tsubuyaki as Nobuyuki Takeuchi, Kotaro's father
- Akiko Iwase as Sakae Takeuchi, Kotaro's mother
- Takahiro Miura as Kamekichi Okuda, Rin's husband
- Toshie Negishi as Sada Okuda, Kamekichi's mother
- Miyuki Oshima as the proprietress of an eel restaurant
- Yumi Yoshitatsu as the proprietress of a Japanese confectionery shop
- Takuya (The Touch) as Shibata-ya
- Kazuya (The Touch) as Matsunaga-ya
- Taizo Harada as Zensaku Yoshie
- Anya Floris as Mary

=== The people of Tokyo ===
- Masaya Sano (Ae! Group) as Kenjiro Shimada
- Kisetsu Fujiwara as Eisuke Kohinata
- Yuta Hayashi as Taichi Makimura
- Bando Yajuro as Usaburo Shimizu
- Chika Uchida as Fumi Yanagawa, Naomi's mother
- Fumiya Ogura as Kisuke Matsubara
- Mikako Tabe as Sutematsu Ōyama
- Masahiro Takashima as Iwao Ōyama
- Tsurutaro Kataoka as Kaishū Katsu
- Yoneko Matsukane as Toyo Oya
- Yuriko Hirooka as Kiku Oya
- Shiho Harumi as Kahei Oya
- Hirono Nita as Fusa Matsuyama
- Seina Nakata as Shima Kawai
- Himawari Inoue as Saho Kimura
- Rei Maruyama as Matsu Nakayama
- Naoko Ken as Maji, a fortune teller

=== Umeoka Nursing School ===
- Erika Ikuta as Tae Tamada
- Akiko Kikuchi as Kiyo Izumi
- Tomo Nakai as Yuki Shinonome
- Aki Kigoshi as Shinobu Yanagita
- Rin Harashima as Tome Kudo
- Hyunri as Ei Matsui
- Shima Ise as Toshiko Kajiwara
- Emma Howard as Barnes

=== Teito University Medical Hospital ===
- Yūta Furukawa as Masuo Imai
- Ryotaro Sakaguchi as Kunio Fujita
- Kinari Hirano as Katsuji Kurokawa
- Kanro Watanabe as Yukinari Watanabe
- Tsubaki Nekoze as Fuyu Nagata
- Jiro (Sissonne) as Kosuke Nagata
- Kazuki Iio as Mansaku Shibata
- Jiei Wakabayashi as Chuzo Maruyama
- Honoka Murakami as Yunagi
- Ayaka Higashino as Tsuya Miura
- Yoshihiro Nozoe as Yaichiro Sonobe
- Michitaka Tsutsui as Jutaro Tada
- Yuta Kanai as Kosaku Sakata
- Yukie Nakama as Chikako Izumi
- Ayumi Tanida as Motohiko Izumi
- Akana Ikeda as Hide Doi
- Ririka Kawashima as Tama Adachi

=== The people of Niigata ===
- Tomoya Nakamura as Toji Yagyu
- Yuki Inoue as Kosuke Yokosawa
- Tomokazu Seki as Kanji Mochizuki
- Hana Kondo as Hisa Nagami
- Sayaka Isoyama as Sawa Nagami
- Kokoaa Kawamura as Tsune Iwase
- Karen Miyama as Asa
- Shunya Itabashi as Tasuke
- Soraji Shibuya as Chotaro
- Hiroo Otaka as Tadayoshi Honma
- Shinji Rokkaku as Yamabe
- Ryo Nishihori as Ginji Hada
- Natsuko Yokosawa as Tetsu Hada

=== Others ===
- Shouma Kai as Goro Ogawa, Naomi's husband
- Hikari Ōta as Heizo Endo
- Shoko Aida as Kae Miyagawa

== Production ==
On January 24, 2025, NHK announced the production of its 114th Asadora, titled The Scent of the Wind. During the announcement, it was revealed that Ai Mikami would star as one of the two lead heroines. NHK also noted that the second heroine would be selected through an open audition process.

On June 3 of the same year, NHK held a follow-up press conference to announce that Juri Kosaka had been cast for the role, having been selected from a pool of 2,410 audition participants.

== TV schedule ==
Week	Episodes	Title	Directed by	Original airdate	Rating
1	1–5	"Tsubasa to Katana" (翼と刀)	Yoshiharu Sasaki	March 30–April 3, 2026	14.3%
2	6–10	"Tomoshibi no Michi" (灯の道)	Shinzo Nitta	April 6–10, 2026	13.6%
3	11–15	"Haru-ichiban no Kizashi" (春一番のきざし)	Hitoshi Matsumoto	April 13–17, 2026	13.8%
4	16–20	"Watashi-tachi no Society" (私たちのソサイエティ)	Yoshiharu Sasaki	April 20–24, 2026	14.1%
5	21–25	"Tsudoishi Mono-tachi" (集いし者たち)	Mayo Hashimoto	April 27–May 1, 2026	13.9%
6	26–30	"Tenkyu no Kyoshitsu" (天泣の教室)	Shinzo Nitta	May 4–8, 2026	13.1%
7	31–35	"Todokanu Koe" (届かぬ声)	Hitoshi Matsumoto	May 11–15, 2026	13.9%
8	36–40	"Yubae" (夕映え)	Yoshiharu Sasaki	May 18–22, 2026	14.7%
9	41–45	"Kanbyofu to Ame" (看病婦とアメ)	Mayo Hashimoto	May 25–29, 2026	14.1%
10	45–50	"Shippu ni Keiso o" (疾風に勁草を)	Shinzo Nitta	June 1–5, 2026	14.8%
11	51–55	"Nagi ni Soyogu" (凪にそよぐ)	Yoshiharu Sasaki	June 8–12, 2026	13.7%
12	56–60	"Tabidachi" (旅立ち)	Yoshiharu Sasaki	June 15–19, 2026	14.0%
13	61–65	"Hakujitsu no Yume" (白日の夢)	Mayo Hashimoto	June 22–26, 2026	13.5%
14	66–70	"Uso to Makoto" (ウソと誠)	Hitoshi Matsumoto	June 29–July 3, 2026	13.3%
15	71–75	"Sashidasenu Te" (差し出せぬ手)	Hitoshi Matsumoto	July 6–10, 2026	13.3%
16	76–80	"Shinpu Fuku Koro" (新風吹くころ)	Takashi Uchida	July 13–17, 2026	13.8%
17	81–85	"Myakudo" (脈動)	Mayo Hashimoto	July 20–24, 2026	13.8%
18	86–90	"Kiro nite" (岐路にて)	Shinzo Nitta	July 27–31, 2026	13.9%
19	91–95	"Reimei no Tsubasa" (黎明の翼)	Yoshiharu Sasaki	August 3–7, 2026	13.0%
20	96–100	"Kazoku no Katachi" (家族のかたち)	Hitoshi Matsumoto and Shunsuke Taira	August 10–14, 2026	14.1%
21	101–105	"Sadame to Sentaku" (定めと選択)	Takashi Uchida	August 17–21, 2026	14.1%
22	106–110	"Akarui Mirai" (明るい未来)	Mayo Hashimoto, Riku Kadowaki and Mika Takahashi	August 24–28, 2026	13.5%
23	111–115	"Hoho Seifu" (歩々清風)	Hitoshi Matsumoto	August 31–September 4, 2026	14.0%
24	116–120	"Tamaki" (環)	Shinzo Nitta	September 7–11, 2026	14.4%
25	121–125	"Fubaika" (風媒花)	Mayo Hashimoto	September 14–18, 2026	13.9%
26	126–130	"Michishirube" (道標)	Yoshiharu Sasaki	September 21–25, 2026	14.2%
Average rating 13.8% - Rating is based on Japanese Video Research (Kantō region).

Preceded by The Ghost Writer's Wife	Asadora; March 30, 2026–September 25, 2026	Succeeded by Blossom
