= Anpan (TV series) =

- Genre: Drama
- Written by: Miho Nakazono
- Directed by: Tsuyoshi Yanagawa and others
- Starring: Mio Imada; Takumi Kitamura; Ryo Kase; Noriko Eguchi; Yuumi Kawai; Nanoka Hara; Kanata Hosoda; Fumiya Takahashi; Kenjiro Tsuda; Motoki Nakazawa; Motoki Ohmori; Kazunari Ninomiya; Naho Toda; Miyoko Asada; Kōtarō Yoshida; Yutaka Takenouchi; Satoshi Tsumabuki; Sadao Abe; Nanako Matsushima
- Narrated by: Risa Hayashida
- Opening theme: "Tamamono" by Radwimps
- Composer: Akio Izutsu
- Country of origin: Japan
- Original language: Japanese
- No. of episodes: 130

Production
- Producers: Shusuke Nakamura; Ryosuke Funada; Shunsuke Kawaguchi
- Running time: 15 minutes
- Production company: NHK

Original release
- Network: NHK General TV
- Release: March 31 – September 26, 2025

Anpan (あんぱん) is a Japanese television drama series and the 112th Asadora series, following Omusubi. This drama is inspired by Nobu Komatsu, the wife of Takashi Yanase, the creator of Anpanman, but it is a fictional and original work.

Mio Imada was chosen for the lead role of Nobu Asada from among 3365 auditionees.

== Plot ==
Nobu Asada, who was deeply influenced by militaristic ideology, experienced the horrors of war, which completely changed her values. After the war, she and her husband, Takashi, pursued "a justice that never overturns." Takashi eventually created a masterpiece picture book.

== Cast ==
=== Asada family ===
- Mio Imada as Nobu Asada
  - Yuzuna Nagase as young Nobu
- Ryo Kase as Yutaro Asada, Nobu's father
- Noriko Eguchi as Hatako Asada, Nobu's mother
- Yuumi Kawai as Ranko Asada, Nobu's sister
  - Sakura Yoshikawa as young Ranko
- Nanoka Hara as Meiko Asada, Nobu's sister
  - Sae Nagatani as young Meiko
- Kōtarō Yoshida as Kamaji Asada, Nobu's grandfather
- Miyoko Asada as Kura Asada, Nobu's grandmother
- Kanata Hosoda as Go Hara

=== Yanai family ===
- Takumi Kitamura as Takashi Yanai, Nobu's second husband
  - Yura Kimura as young Takashi
- Nanako Matsushima as Tomiko Yanai, Takashi's mother
- Kazunari Ninomiya as Kiyoshi Yanai, Takashi's father
- Motoki Nakazawa as Chihiro Yanai, Takashi's brother
  - Seigou Hirayama as young Chihiro
- Yutaka Takenouchi as Hiroshi Yanai, Takashi's uncle
- Naho Toda as Chiyoko Yanai, Takashi's aunt
- Himari Hitomi as Shin Uto

=== Kokura regiment ===
- Satoshi Tsumabuki as Shinnosuke Yagi
- Eita Okuno as Manzo Kamino
- Shun'ya Itabashi as Riki Baba
- Ryosuke Hagiwara as Tetsu Koda
- Kento Sakurai as Kota Konno
- Yukito Hidaka as Arata Meguro
- Hiroki Usudaira as Yasuo Kabata
- Shunsuke Tanaka as Masaki Kasuya
- Eiji Yokota as Senkichi Shima

=== Kōchi Shimpō ===
- Kenjiro Tsuda as Akira Shoji
- Yui Narumi as Kotoko Oda
- Yuki Kura as Shinji Iwashimizu
- Nomura Manzo IX as Ryo Kirishima
- Koji Furukawa as Izuru Torii
- Riku Kashima as Tatsuya Midorikawa
- Takuya Wakabayashi as Seizo Aoki

=== Others ===
- Sadao Abe as Sōkichi "Uncle Yam" Yamura, a baker
- Fumiya Takahashi as Kentaro Karashima, Meiko's husband
- Sara Shida as Usako Ogawa
- Sonim as Mimi Yamashita
- Kumi Takiuchi as Yukiko Kuroi
- Koichi Yamadera as Haruto Zama
- Motoki Ohmori (Mrs. Green Apple) as Takuya Ise. He is modeled after Taku Izumi
- Soua Ogura as Manpei Katsura
- Sumi Shimamoto as Kako Ode
- Satoru Saito as Tenpo, a monk
- Tomohiro Ichikawa as Katsuo Kijima
- Noritaka Hamao as Iwao Tagawa
- Ayumu Nakajima as Jiro Wakamatsu, Nobu's first husband
- Misuzu Kanno as Setsuko Wakamatsu
- Ryūsei Nakao as Tokizo Furuyama
- Keiko Toda as Tetsuko Maki
- Masatoshi Kihara as Norio Sera
- Gordon Maeda as Osamu Tejima, a manga artist. He is modeled after Osamu Tezuka
- Shiori Kubo as Tamae Shiratori, a singer. She is modeled after Mariko Miyagi
- Ryohei Odai as Degawa
- Sho Aoyagi as Ōne
- Hinata Todo as Eisuke Rokuhara. He is modeled after Rokusuke Ei
- Ko Nanase as Ko Oshima, a manga artist
- Tsutomu Ikeda as Mitsuo Miura, a manga artist
- Pajama Ehara as Hiroshi Kurita, a manga artist
- Yuzuna Nagase (Note: dual role) as Kaho Nakazato. She is modeled after Miho Nakazono, the screenwriter of this series.
- Michiyo Yanagisawa as Buruburu (voice)
- Miyuki Sawashiro as Mukumuku (voice)
- Kotone Furukawa as Seiko Nakao
- Kenta Hamano as Hirame Hamabe
- Kanata Irei as Goro Mano
- Momoka Satake as Mika Komiya
- Jun Nishiyama as Mamoru Furukawa
- Kou Maehara as Keizo Takeyama
- Renji Ishibashi as Mitsuru Horii
- Keiko Toda (Note: dual role) as Yoshiko Tobe's voice. She is modeled after Keiko Toda, the voice of Anpanman.

== TV schedule ==
Week	Episodes	Title	Directed by	Original airdate	Rating
1	1–5	"Ningen nante Samishii ne" (人間なんてさみしいね)	Tsuyoshi Yanagawa	March 31–April 4, 2025	15.2%
2	6–10	"Fushiawase-san Konnichiwa" (フシアワセさん今日は)	Shin'ichiro Hashizume	April 7–11, 2025	15.3%
3	11–15	"Nan no Tame ni Umarete" (なんのために生まれて)	Tsuyoshi Yanagawa	April 14–18, 2025	15.3%
4	16–20	"Nani o Shite Ikiru noka" (なにをして生きるのか)	Shin'ichiro Hashizume	April 21–25, 2025	15.4%
5	21–25	"Jinsei wa Yorokobase-gokko" (人生は喜ばせごっこ)	Tsuyoshi Yanagawa	April 28–May 2, 2025	15.3%
6	26–30	"Kurushimu noka Aisuru noka" (くるしむのか愛するのか)	Yuta Noguchi	May 5–9, 2025	15.1%
7	31–35	"Umi to Namida to Watashi to" (海と涙と私と)	Shin'ichiro Hashizume	May 12–16, 2025	15.5%
8	36–40	"Meguriai Wakareyuku" (めぐりあい わかれゆく)	Tsuyoshi Yanagawa	May 19–23, 2025	15.5%
9	41–45	"Zetsubō no Tonari wa Kibō" (絶望の隣は希望)	Yuta Noguchi	May 26–30, 2025	15.8%
10	46–50	"Ikiro" (生きろ)	Shin'ichiro Hashizume	June 2–6, 2025	15.8%
11	51–55	"Guntai wa Daikirai, Dakedo" (軍隊は大きらい、だけど)	Tsuyoshi Yanagawa	June 9–13, 2025	16.0%
12	56–60	"Gyakuten shinai Seigi" (逆転しない正義)	Tsuyoshi Yanagawa	June 16–20, 2025	16.0%
13	61–65	"Saraba Namida" (サラバ 涙)	Yuta Noguchi	June 23–27, 2025	16.2%
14	66–70	"Shiawase yo, Doko ni Iru" (幸福よ、どこにいる)	Shin'ichiro Hashizume	June 30–July 4, 2025	16.9%
15	71–75	"Iza! Tokyo" (いざ!東京)	Yuki Sahara	July 7–11, 2025	16.1%
16	76–80	"Omoshirogatte Ikie" (面白がって生きえ)	Yuta Noguchi	July 14–18, 2025	16.0%
17	80–85	"Anata no Nibai Anata o Suki" (あなたの二倍あなたを好き)	Tsuyoshi Yanagawa	July 21–25, 2025	16.4%
18	86–90	"Futarishite Aruku Ima ga Shiawase" (ふたりしてあるく 今がしあわせ)	Tatsuya Ozaki	July 28–August 1, 2025	16.6%
19	91–95	"Yūki no Hana" (勇気の花)	Shin'ichiro Hashizume	August 4–8, 2025	15.5%
20	96–100	"Miagete goran Yoru no Hoshi o" (見上げてごらん夜の星を)	Yuki Sahara	August 11–15, 2025	16.6%
21	101–105	"Te no Hira o Taiyo ni" (手のひらを太陽に)	Yuta Noguchi	August 18–22, 2025	16.6%
22	106–110	"Aisuru Katachi" (愛するカタチ)	Tsuyoshi Yanagawa and Ruri Hidaka	August 25–29, 2025	16.7%
23	111–115	"Bokura wa Muryoku dakeredo" (ぼくらは無力だけれど)	Tsuyoshi Yanagawa	September 1–5, 2025	16.9%
24	116–120	"Anpanman Tanjō" (あんぱんまん誕生)	Shin'ichiro Hashizume	September 8–12, 2025	17.1%
25	121–125	"Kaiketsu Anpanman" (怪傑アンパンマン)	Shūsuke Nakamura	September 15–19, 2025	16.6%
26	126–130	"Ai to Yūki dake ga Tomodachi sa" (愛と勇気だけが友達さ)	Tsuyoshi Yanagawa	September 22–26, 2025	17.1%
Average rating 16.1% - Rating is based on Japanese Video Research (Kantō region).

== Notes ==
Preceded by Omusubi	Asadora; 31 March – 26 September 2025	Succeeded by The Ghost Writer's Wife
