= David Muñoz (director) =

Spanish film director

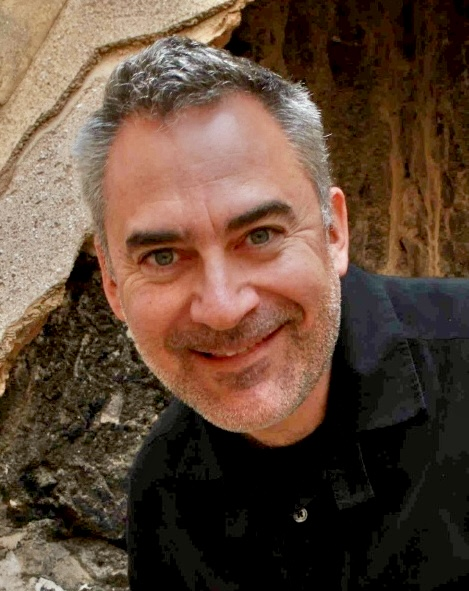
- Born: 1968 (age 56–57); Málaga, Andalucia, Spain
- Occupation(s): Film producer, screenwriter, director

David Muñoz was born in 1968 in Málaga, Andalucia, southern Spain and is a Spanish director, producer, and screenwriter.

== Biography ==
He has a PhD in Financial Economics. He also worked as a financial adviser to several regional governments in Spain, and as a professor of financial applications for professionals.

In 2000, he founded Hibrida: a multidisciplinary communications company involved in contemporary culture and social issues. He has been Hibrida's director since its inception.

== Film career ==
He writes, directs and produces documentary and fiction films. He is the winner of the Goya Awards 2010 for best short documentary given by the Spanish Film Academy for Flowers of Rwanda. His film The Infinite Jest was a Jury Award 2011 winner for best short documentary in the 7th Aljazeera International Documentary Film Festival (Qatar). His previous film, Another Night on Earth won, among others, the Film Critics FIPRESCI award at DOK Leipzig, the best feature documentary award at the 15th Guanajuato International Film Festival, and the Japan Foundation Presidential’s Prize at NHK Japan Prize. About Ndugu was a world premiere at the Berlinale 63rd Berlin International Film Festival. His poetic documentary "A Farewell to All That" about the Verdiales, a disappearing type of music played by shepherds in the Andalusian sierras, won the ASECAN Award to Best Andalusian Short Documentary in 2018.

== Director filmography ==
Year	Film
2007	Human Development
2008	Flowers of Rwanda
2008	854
2010	Tres Tristes Tigres
2011	The Infinite Jest
2012	Otra Noche en la Tierra
2013	About Ndugu
2014	Hide & Seek
2015	Veloce Vita
2017	A Farewell to All That
2020	Un Trono para Miss Ghana
