= Special research police JUMPolice =

- Genre: Variety show
- Starring: Oriental Radio; Rika Adachi; Rina Ikoma
- Country of origin: Japan
- Original language: Japanese

Production
- Running time: 30 minutes

Original release
- Network: TV Tokyo
- Release: April 4, 2014 – March 30, 2019

Special research police JUMPolice (特捜警察ジャンポリス, Tokusō Keisatsu JANporisu) is a Japanese TV program which began airing on April 4, 2014. This is a variety show which features Weekly Shōnen Jump, V Jump, Jump Square, Saikyō Jump and their anime and games. JUMPolice is short for Jump Under Mission Police.

== Characters ==
- Oriental Radio
- Atsuhiko Nakata - He is the boss of the JUMPolice
- Shingo Fujimori - He is his assistant
- Rika Adachi - She is checker.
- Rina Ikoma - She is the leader of researchers.
- Yui Ito - She is researcher. She tells the next issue of the magazines.
- Takashi Kondo and Ryoko Shintani- narrators
- Pororisu-kun - He is mascot character voiced by Ryoko Shintani.

=== JUMPolice investigators ===
All of them are members of Nogizaka46.

- Yumi Wakatsuki
- Kazumi Takayama
- Sayuri Matsumura
- Manatsu Akimoto
- Yūri Saitō
- Reika Sakurai

== Main corner ==
Kochikame short trip
Masao Inuduka dresses as Kankichi Ryotsu, and travels around Kameari and Ueno, Asakusa and so on. Nataria dresses as Reiko, and Gregory dresses as Nakagawa, Fujimori dresses as Ohara, Tonikaku akarui yasumura dresses as kaipan deka.
Here comes Osamurai-chan!
Osamurai-chan travels around Japan to look for Yu-Gi-Oh! cards.
Informacial
Yui Ito talks about coming issues of the magazines. This corner is a commercial for Shueisha.
