= Nanami Hashimoto =

Former Japanese singer and actress (born 1993)

- 橋本 奈々未
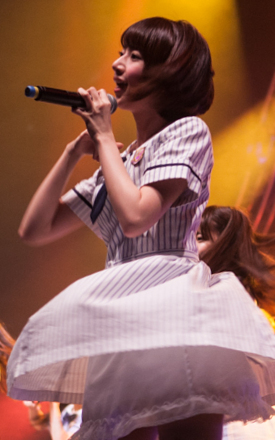
- Hashimoto performing with Nogizaka46 at the 2014 Japan Expo
- Born: 20 February 1993 (age 33); Asahikawa, Hokkaido, Japan
- Other name: Nanamin
- Occupations: Singer; actress; model; radio personality (all former)
- Years active: 2011–2017
- Musical career
- Genres: J-pop
- Instruments: Vocals; guitar
- Label: Sony Records/N46Div
- Formerly of: Nogizaka46

Nanami Hashimoto (橋本 奈々未, Hashimoto Nanami; born February 20, 1993) is a retired Japanese singer, actress, radio personality, and model. She is a former first generation member of the idol girl group Nogizaka46 from 2011 to 2017.

== Early life and education ==
Nanami Hashimoto was born on February 20, 1993, in Asahikawa City, Hokkaido. She has one younger brother. In an episode of Nogizaka Under Construction, Hashimoto revealed during her "graduation" from Nogizaka46 that she grew up in a poor household, saying, "Gas, water, and electricity were cut off on a regular basis due to nonpayment of bills." However, she added that even so, she grew up in a family passionate about education, and was instilled with basic academic skills.

During her school days, she was active in the basketball club from elementary up to high school, and at one point became the club's vice president and manager. Since then she has become a fan of the Japanese basketball league and the NBA. At that time, her future career goals were to become a civil servant or a lawyer.

After graduating from high school, she went to an art university in Tokyo to study spatial design.

== Career ==
Hashimoto passed the first generation auditions for Nogizaka46 in August 2011. Her audition song was Under Graph's "Tsubasa". She was chosen as one of the members performing on the group's debut single "Guruguru Curtain", released on February 22, 2012.

From April to June 2013 she starred as the heroine in NTV's drama Bad Boys J. In July of that year, she played a recurring role in Fuji TV's Getsuku drama Summer Nude. Hashimoto made her film debut in Bad Boys J: Saigo ni Mamoru Mono which was released on November 9, 2013.

On March 23, 2015, she was chosen as an exclusive model for the women's fashion magazine CanCam, along with fellow first generation Nogizaka46 member Sayuri Matsumura. In April 2015, she began appearing on the Tokyo FM radio show School of Lock! on the third week of the month. On August 28 of the same year, she published her first photobook, Yasashii Toge. It ranked first on the Oricon book ranking in the photobook category, selling 21,000 copies in the first week. It also ranked fourth in the book category. She is the third Nogizaka46 member to publish a photobook, following Mai Shiraishi and Nanase Nishino.

On February 25, 2016, her own intellectual entertainment show, Nogizaka46 Hashimoto Nanami no Koi Suru Bungaku, premiered on UHB. In that show, she introduces a novel on the theme of Hokkaido, where she grew up. She was selected as the choreographic center for the first time on Nogizaka46's sixteenth single "Sayonara no Imi", which was released on November 9, 2016. This is also the last Nogizaka46 single to feature her. On October 20, 2016, she announced her graduation from Nogizaka46 and retirement from the entertainment industry as a whole on the midnight radio show Nogizaka46's All Night Nippon.

On February 16, 2017, her second photobook, titled 2017, was published. It sold 27,185 copies in the first week and ranked first on the Oricon weekly photobook ranking. Her last concert was the first day of the Nogizaka46 5th Year Birthday Live, held at Saitama Super Arena on February 20, 2017. She retired from the entertainment industry afterwards.

On April 1, 2024, she joined Sony Music Entertainment as an employee.

== Discography ==
=== Singles with Nogizaka46 ===
| Year | No. | Title | Role | Notes |
|---|---|---|---|---|
| 2012 | 1 | "Guruguru Curtain" | A-side | Debut as 1st Generation member; Also sang on "Nogizaka no Uta", "Aitakatta Kamoshirenai", "Ushinaitakunai kara" and "Shiroi Kumo ni Notte" |
| 2012 | 2 | "Oide Shampoo" | A-side | Also sang on "Kokoro no Kusuri", "Gūzen o Iiwake ni Shite" and "House!" |
| 2012 | 3 | "Hashire! Bicycle" | A-side | Also sang on "Sekkachi na Katatsumuri", "Hito wa Naze Hashiru no ka" and "Oto ga Denai Guitar" |
| 2012 | 4 | "Seifuku no Mannequin" | A-side | Also sang on "Yubi Bōenkyō" |
| 2013 | 5 | "Kimi no Na wa Kibō" | A-side | Also sang on "Shakiism", "Romantic Ikayaki" and "Dekopin" |
| 2013 | 6 | "Girl's Rule" | A-side | Also sang on "Sekai de Ichiban Kodoku na Lover" and "Ningen to Iu Gakki" |
| 2013 | 7 | "Barrette" | A-side | Also sang on "Tsuki no Ōkisa", "Sonna Baka na…" and Yasashisa to wa |
| 2014 | 8 | "Kizuitara Kataomoi" | A-side | Also sang on "Romance no Start", "Toiki no Method" and "Kodoku Kyōdai" |
| 2014 | 9 | "Natsu no Free & Easy" | A-side | Also sang on "Nani mo Dekizu ni Soba ni Iru" and "Sono Saki no Deguchi" |
| 2014 | 10 | "Nandome no Aozora ka?" | A-side | Also sang on "Korogatta Kane o Narase!" and "Tender days" |
| 2015 | 11 | "Inochi wa Utsukushii" | A-side | Also sang on "Tachinaorichū" |
| 2015 | 12 | "Taiyō Nokku" | A-side | Also sang on "Sakanatachi no LOVE SONG" and "Hane no Kioku" |
| 2015 | 13 | "Ima, Hanashitai Dareka ga Iru" | A-side | Also sang on "Popipappapā" and "Kanashimi no Wasurekata" |
| 2016 | 14 | "Harujion ga Sakukoro" | A-side | Also sang on "Kyūshamen" |
| 2016 | 15 | "Hadashi de Summer" | A-side | Also sang on "Boku Dake no Hikari" |
| 2016 | 16 | "Sayonara no Imi" | A-side, center | Last single to participate; Also sang on "Kodoku na Aozora" and "Naimononedari" which was her graduation song. |

=== Albums with Nogizaka46 ===
| Year | No. | Title | Participated song |
|---|---|---|---|
| 2015 | 1 | Tōmei na Iro | "Boku ga Iru Basho"; "Kakumei no Uma" |
| 2016 | 2 | Sorezore no Isu | "Kikkake"; "Taiyō ni Kudokarete"; "Kūkikan" |

=== Other featured songs ===
| Year | Artist | Title | Albums / Singles |
|---|---|---|---|
| 2012 | Mayu Watanabe | "Twin Tail wa Mō Shinai" | "Otona Jellybeans" |

== Filmography ==
=== Television ===
| Year | Title | Role | Channel | Notes | Ref(s) |
|---|---|---|---|---|---|
| 2013 | Bad Boys J | Kumi Yoshimoto | Nippon TV | | |
| 2013 | Summer Nude | Kiyoko Ishikari | Fuji TV | | |
| 2013 | Love Riron | Yui Aragaki | TV Tokyo | | |
| 2015 | Hatsumori Bemars | Marukyū | TV Tokyo | | |
| 2015 | Burning Flower | Okugoten harem | NHK | Taiga drama | |
| 2016 | Nogizaka46 Hashimoto Nanami no Koi Suru Bungaku | Herself | UHB | Documentary | |
| 2016 | Nogizaka46 Hashimoto Nanami no Koi Suru Bungaku Natsu no Tabi | Herself | UHB | Documentary | |

=== Films ===
| Year | Title | Role | Notes | Ref(s) |
|---|---|---|---|---|
| 2013 | Bad Boys J: Saigo ni Mamoru Mono | Kumi Yoshimoto | | |
| 2014 | Chōnōryoku Kenkyūbu no 3-nin | Azumi Kogure | | |
| 2015 | Kanashimi no Wasurekata : Documentary of Nogizaka46 | Herself | Documentary | |

=== Radio ===
| Year | Title | Station | Ref(s) |
|---|---|---|---|
| 2015–17 | School of Lock! | Tokyo FM | |

=== Music videos ===
| Year | Title | Artist | Ref(s) |
|---|---|---|---|
| 2014 | "Endless Road" | Fumika | |
| 2015 | "Girl! Girl! Girl!" | Fujifabric | |

== Bibliography ==
=== Magazines ===
- CanCam, Shogakukan 1981–, as an exclusive model from May 2015 to March 2017 issue

=== Photobooks ===
- NogizakaHa: Nogizaka46 First Shashinshū (2013, Futabasha: ISBN 978-4-575-30587-6)
- Kikan Nogizaka vol.3 Ryōshū (4 September 2014, Tokyo News Service) ISBN 9784863364264
- Yasashii Toge (28 August 2015, Gentosha) ISBN 9784344027947
- Nogizaka46 Second Shashinshū 1 Jikan Okure no I Love You (2016, Shufu to Seikatsusha; ISBN 978-4-391149302)
- Hashimoto Nanami Shashinshū 2017 (16 February 2017, Shogakukan) ISBN 9784096822395
