= Rina Ikoma =

Japanese actress (born 1995)

- 生駒 里奈
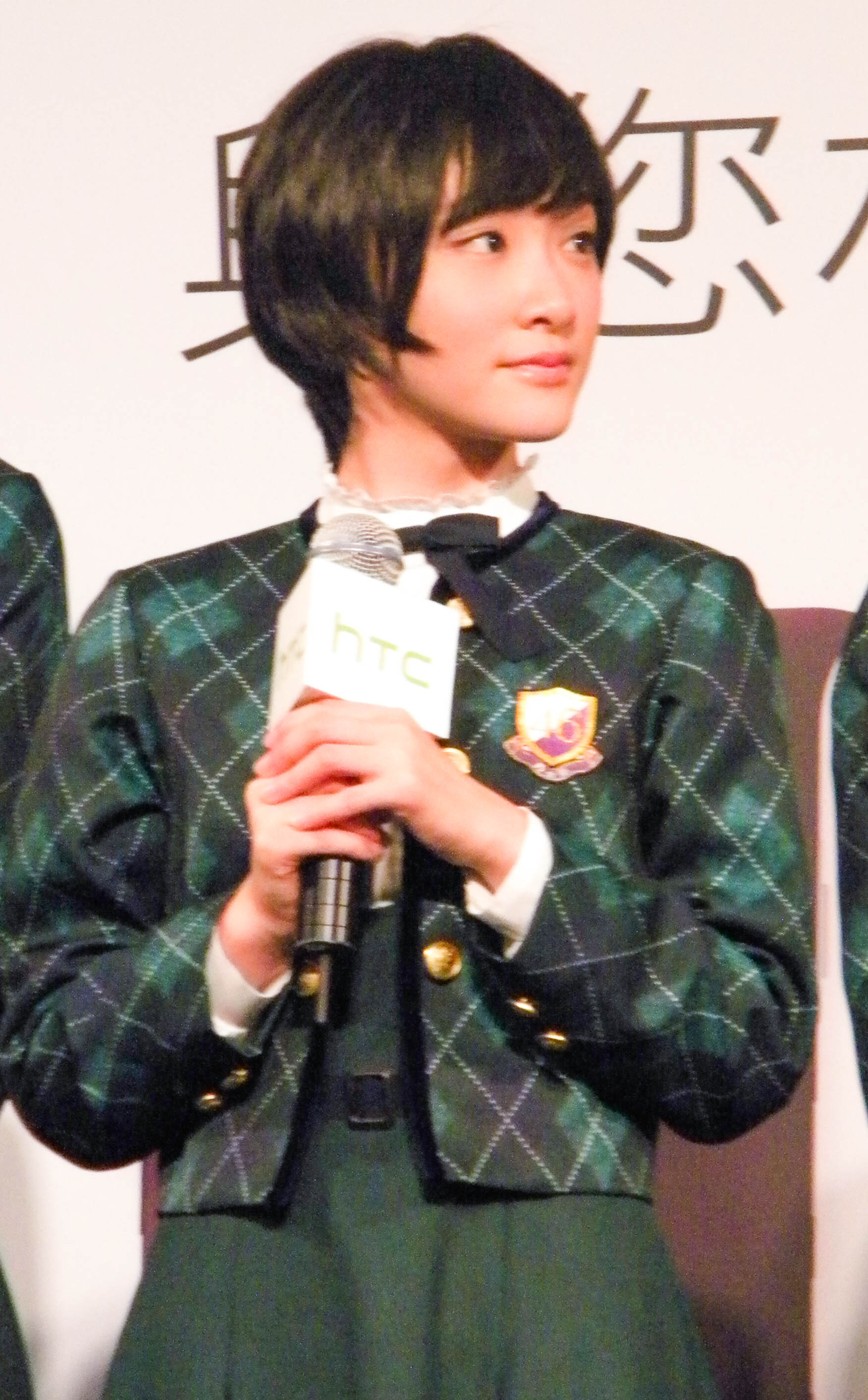
- Ikoma in 2014
- Born: 29 December 1995 (age 30); Yurihonjō, Akita Prefecture, Japan
- Occupation: Actress
- Years active: 2011–present
- Agent: A.M.Entertainment
- Musical career
- Also known as: Ikoma-chan, Ikotan
- Genres: J-pop
- Instrument: Vocals
- Label: Sony Records/N46Div
- Formerly of: Nogizaka46 (2011-2018); AKB48 (2014-2015)

YouTube information
- Channel: Ikomachannel
- Years active: 2020-present
- Genre: Vlog
- Subscribers: 189 thousand
- Views: 8.9 million
- Last updated: April 20, 2026
- Website: ikomarina.com

Rina Ikoma (生駒 里奈, Ikoma Rina; born December 29, 1995) is a Japanese actress and former idol singer best recognized as the "Face of Nogizaka46". She was a first generation member of the girl group Nogizaka46 and AKB48's Team B, also known as the former's eternal ace and original center, being appointed the position for an A-side six times in total for Nogizaka46's first five singles, "Guruguru Curtain", "Oide Shampoo", "Hashire! Bicycle", "Seifuku no Mannequin", and "Kimi no Na wa Kibō", as well as their 12th Single "Taiyō Nokku", which was the record highest at the time for the group, and is still the most for solo centers. Yasushi Akimoto originally made it to be so that Ikoma's graduation single "Synchronicity" was for her as center, but she declined.

She played the leading role of Naomi Nakashima in the film Corpse Party.

== History ==
=== 1995–2018: Early life and Nogizaka46 ===
Ikoma was born in Yurihonjō, Akita Prefecture on December 29, 1995. During elementary school, she was bullied, which made her not want to go to school, but she still did so that her mother wouldn't worry. Ikoma had been learning to dance since childhood, and became involved in the show business with the encouragement of her father who encouraged her to audition for Nogizaka46. In 2011, she applied for the Nogizaka46 auditions along with 38,934 other girls. She became one of the 56 candidates who advanced to the final round. As of August, she was chosen to become one of the 36 1st Generation members.

For Nogizaka46's debut single, "Guruguru Curtain", Ikoma was chosen to be the center in the song's choreography. She once again solidified her position in their second single, titled "Oide Shampoo", and recorded a solo song, which was included as a B-side on the single. This would be Nogizaka46's system during the group's early period. The 4th Single "Seifuku no Mannequin" would become her signature song. On 24 February 2014, it was announced at the AKB48 Group Team Shuffle that she would join AKB48's Team B.

On 26 February 2015, it was revealed that Ikoma will star in a live-action film based on the Corpse Party series of video games. Exactly a month later, on 26 March, it was announced that she would leave AKB48. On Nogizaka46's 12th Single "Taiyō Nokku" released on 22 July 2015, Ikoma returned as the group's center from her concurrent position in AKB48, last holding position zero on their 5th Single "Kimi no Na wa Kibō" two years prior.

On 21 February 2016, it was announced that she became a model for Anna Sui in Asian regions. She published her first solo photo book, Kimi no Ashiato, on 24 February 2016. It sold 16,000 copies in its first week, and ranked 1st on the Oricon weekly photo book sales chart. On 29 March 2016, Ikoma participated in the ceremonial first pitch before a baseball match between The Fukuoka SoftBank Hawks and the Saitama Seibu Lions. She also appeared in SoftBank's advertising as the voice of "Giga-chan". In the same year, she reprised her lead role in the sequel to the Corpse Party film, Corpse Party: Book of Shadows. The film was released in Japan in July 2016. Ikoma also appeared in a musical adaptation of Kochira Katsushika-ku Kameari Kōen-mae Hashutsujo in September 2016.

On 31 January 2018, Ikoma announced her graduation from Nogizaka46 on the group's official blog. On 22 April, her graduation concert was held at the Nippon Budokan. Nogizaka46's 20th Single, "Synchronicity" was released on 25 April. It was the group's last single to feature Ikoma. After the revelation of her position at the middle of the second row caused a huge shock because the face of the group wasn't center for her own graduation as anticipated, amid reports, it was confirmed in her interview with Nikkan Sports that producer and songwriter Yasushi Akimoto expressed "Synchronicity" was for Ikoma to center, but she declined, for she didn't want the first single since winning the Grand Prix at the Japan Record Awards to be about her. Ikoma's graduation song and 1st Generation song, the B-side "Against" was the group's final song with her as their center, reuniting the front three with Erika Ikuta and Minami Hoshino for the first time since "Kimi no Na wa Kibō". She came up with the idea for the music video. On 6 May, Ikoma officially graduated from the group after an event at Makuhari Messe.

=== 2018–present: Post-Nogizaka46 ===
Ikoma appeared in a musical adaptation of Mahō Sensei Negima! as Negi Springfield in July 2018.

She opened a YouTube channel in 2020 called "生駒里奈 'IKOMACHANNEL'". As of July 2021, it has 220,000 subscribers.

== Discography ==
=== Singles with Nogizaka46 ===
Year	No.	Title	Role	Notes
2012	1	"Guruguru Curtain"	A-side, center	Debut as 1st Generation member; Also sang on "Nogizaka no Uta", "Aitakatta Kamoshirenai", "Ushinaitakunai kara" and "Shiroi Kumo ni Notte"
2012	2	"Oide Shampoo"	A-side, center	Also sang on "Kokoro no Kusuri", "Mizutama Moyō" (solo) and "House!"
2012	3	"Hashire! Bicycle"	A-side, center	Also sang on "Hito wa Naze Hashiru no ka" and "Oto ga Denai Guitar"
2012	4	"Seifuku no Mannequin"	A-side, center	Also sang on "Yubi Bōenkyō" and "Koko Janai Doko ka"
2013	5	"Kimi no Na wa Kibō"	A-side, center	Also sang on "Shakiism" and "Romantic Ikayaki"
2013	6	"Girl's Rule"	A-side	Also sang on "Sekai de Ichiban Kodoku na Lover" and "Ningen to Iu Gakki"
2013	7	"Barrette"	A-side	Also sang on "Tsuki no Ōkisa" and "Sonna Baka na…"
2014	8	"Kizuitara Kataomoi"	A-side	Also sang on "Romance no Start", "Toiki no Method" and "Dankeschön"
2014	9	"Natsu no Free & Easy"	A-side	Also sang on "Nani mo Dekizu ni Soba ni Iru" and "Mukuchi na Lion"
2014	10	"Nandome no Aozora ka?"	A-side	Also sang on "Korogatta Kane o Narase!" and "Tender days"
2015	11	"Inochi wa Utsukushii"	A-side	Also sang on "Arakajime Katarareru Romance"
2015	12	"Taiyō Nokku"	A-side, center	Also sang on "Hane no Kioku"
2015	13	"Ima, Hanashitai Dareka ga Iru"	A-side	Also sang on "Popipappapā" and "Kanashimi no Wasurekata"
2016	14	"Harujion ga Sakukoro"	A-side	Also sang on "Yūutsu to Fūsen Gum"
2016	15	"Hadashi de Summer"	A-side	Also sang on "Boku Dake no Hikari"
2016	16	"Sayonara no Imi"	A-side	Also sang on "Kodoku na Aozora"
2017	17	"Influencer"	A-side	Also sang on "Atarisawari no Nai Hanashi "
2017	18	"Nigemizu"	A-side	Also sang on "Onna wa Hitori ja Nemurenai", "Hito Natsu no Nagasa Yori…" and "Naitatte Iijanaika?"
2017	19	"Itsuka Dekiru kara Kyō Dekiru"	A-side	Also sang on "Fuminshō"
2018	20	"Synchronicity"	A-side	Last single to participate; Also sang on "Against" as 1st Generation member
2020	—	"Sekaijū no Rinjin yo"	—	Charity song during the COVID-19 pandemic

=== Albums with Nogizaka46 ===
Year	No.	Title	Participated song
2015	1	Tōmei na Iro	"Boku ga Iru Basho"; "Keishasuru"
2016	2	Sorezore no Isu	"Kikkake"; "Taiyō ni Kudokarete"; "Kanjō Rokugōsen"
2017	3	Umarete Kara Hajimete Mita Yume	"Skydiving"; "Settei Ondo"; "Mangetsu ga Kieta"

=== Singles with AKB48 ===
Year	No.	Title	Role	Notes
2014	36	"Labrador Retriever"	B-side	First single with AKB48 as concurrent member; Do not sing on title track. Sang on "B Garden" as Team B
2014	37	"Kokoro no Placard"	A-side	Ranked 14th in 2014 General Election.
2014	38	"Kibouteki Refrain"	A-side	Also sang on "Loneliness Club" and "Kaze no Rasen"
2015	39	"Green Flash"	A-side	
2015	40	"Bokutachi wa Tatakawanai"	A-side	Last single with AKB48

=== Albums with AKB48 ===
Year	No.	Title	Participated song
2015	6	Koko ga Rhodes da, Koko de Tobe!	"Koko ga Rhodes da, Koko de Tobe!"; "To go de"

=== Other featured songs ===
Year	Artist	Title	Albums / Singles
2012	Mayu Watanabe	"Twin Tail wa Mō Shinai"	"Otona Jellybeans"

== Filmography ==
=== Television ===
Year	Title	Role	Channel	Notes	Ref(s)
2011–15	Nogizakatte, Doko?	Herself	TV Tokyo		
2012	Tsubokko	Herself	TBS		
2013–15	Piramekino 640	Herself	TV Tokyo		
2013–17	NogiBingo!	Herself	Nippon TV		
2014	Special Research Police JUMPolice	Herself	TV Tokyo		
2015	Hatsumori Bemars	Academy	TV Tokyo		
2015	Hana Moyu		NHK	Taiga drama	
2015–18	Nogizaka Kōjichū	Herself	TV Tokyo		
2016	Honto ni Atta Kowai Hanashi Natsu no Tokubetsu-hen 2016		Fuji TV	One episode	
2017	Riku Kai Kuu Chikyū Seifuku Suru Nante	Herself	TV Asahi		
2018	Oh My Jump!	Tomoko Himura	TV Tokyo		
2018	Ossan's Love	Lemon Murokawa	TV Asahi		
2018	Hoshikuzo Revengers	Akari Mano	Nagoya TV		
2018	eGG	Herself	Nippon TV		
2018	Dropkick on My Devil!	High school girl A	FNS	One episode Voice role	
2022	Othello	Mai Yamaguchi / Mariko Yamaguchi (double role)	Asahi TV	Lead role	
2023	Ohsama Sentai King-Ohger	Iko Marina	Asahi TV	One Episode	

=== Films ===
Year	Title	Role	Ref(s)
2013	Gekijōban Bad Boys J: Saigo ni Mamoru Mono	Airi Kinoshita	
2015	Pirameki Koyaku Koi Monogatari: Koyaku ni Akogareru Subete no Oyako no Tameni	Herself	
2015	Kanashimi no Wasure Kata: Documentary of Nogizaka46	Herself	
2015	Corpse Party	Naomi Nakashima	
2016	Corpse Party Book of Shadows	Naomi Nakashima	
2019	Kamen Rider Reiwa: The First Generation	Finis	
2021	ROOOM	Haruka Yaguchi	
2021	Chasing the Light	Nara Miharu	
2023	Immersion	Mio	
2024	Shinji Muroi: Not Defeated		
2024	Shinji Muroi: Stay Alive		

=== Theatre ===
Year	Title	Role	Venue(s)	Ref(s)
2015	Subete no Inu wa Tengoku e Iku		AiiA 2.5 Theater Tokyo	
2016	Joshiraku Ni: Toki Kakesoba		AiiA 2.5 Theater Tokyo	
2016	Kochira Katsushika-ku Kameari Kōen-mae Hashutsujo	Saki	AiiA 2.5 Theater Tokyo, Sankei Hall Breeze	
2017	Moma no Kasei Tanken Ki	Yūri	Tennōzu The Galaxy Theatre / Sankei Hall Breeze	
2018	Mahō Sensei Negima!: Okochama Sensei wa Syugyō Chu!	Negi Springfield	AiiA 2.5 Theater Tokyo	
2018	Yona of the Dawn: Hiiro no Shukumei-hen	Yona	EX Theater Roppongi	
2022	Fuuto PI The Stage	Akiko Narumi	Sunshine Theater	

=== Commercials ===
Year	Product	Notes
2012-4	House Foods	
2012-4	HTC One S	
2016	SoftBank	Voice role
2017	Recruit	
2017-8	Mouse Computer Japan	

== Bibliography ==
=== Photobooks ===
- NogizakaHa: Nogizaka46 First Shashinshū (2013, Futabasha: ISBN 978-4-575-30587-6)
- Kikan Nogizaka vol.4 Saitō (26 December 2014, Tokyo News Service) ISBN 9784863364516
- Kimi no Ashiato (24 February 2016, Gentosha) ISBN 9784344028869

=== Essay books ===
- Tatsu (立つ) (28 April 2018, Nikkei Business Publications) ISBN 9784822256234
