= Guruguru Curtain =

2012 single by Nogizaka46

- Regular edition cover

Single by Nogizaka46

from the album Tōmei na Iro
- B-side: "Hidarimune no Yuuki"; "Nogizaka no Uta" (Type-A); "Aitakatta Kamo Shirenai" (Type-B); "Ushinaitaku Nai Kara" (Type-C); "Shiroi Kumo ni Notte" (Regular)
- Released: February 22, 2012
- Genre: J-pop
- Length: 4:05
- Label: Sony Records
- Songwriters: Katsuhiko Kurosu; Yoshifumi Kouchi; Michihiko Ōta
- Producer: Yasushi Akimoto

Nogizaka46 singles chronology
"Guruguru Curtain" (2012)	"Oide Shampoo" (2012)

"Guruguru Curtain" (Japanese: ぐるぐるカーテン, Hepburn: Guruguru Kāten; "Round and round curtain") is the debut single by Japanese girl group Nogizaka46, released on February 22, 2012. It reached number two in the Oricon Weekly Chart and sold 136,309 copies in the first week. It reached number three on the Billboard Japan Hot 100.

== Release ==
This single was released in 4 versions. Type-A, Type-B, Type-C and a regular edition. The first three editions are CD+DVD. Type-B includes the song Aitakatta Kamo Shirenai, which is a minor arranged version of AKB48's single Aitakatta.

The center position in the choreography for the title song is held by Rina Ikoma.

== Production ==
Lyrics in the song describe experience of happiness and serenity in a lesbian relationship.

== Track listing ==
=== Type-A ===
CD
No.	Title	Length
1.	"Guruguru Curtain" (ぐるぐるカーテン)	4:05
2.	"Hidarimune no Yuuki" (左胸の勇気)	4:55
3.	"Nogizaka no Uta" (乃木坂の詩)	4:32
4.	"Guruguru Curtain off vocal ver." (ぐるぐるカーテン off vocal ver.)	4:05
5.	"Hidarimune no Yuuki off vocal ver." (左胸の勇気 off vocal ver.)	4:55
6.	"Nogizaka no Uta off vocal ver." (乃木坂の詩 off vocal ver.)	4:30
Total length:		27:02

DVD
No.	Title	Length
1.	"Guruguru Curtain Music Video"	4:14
2.	"Nogizaka no Uta Music Video"	4:59
3.	"Rina Ikoma × Yukihiko Tsutsumi"	5:00
4.	"Nene Itō × Katsuo"	2:36
5.	"Sayuri Inoue × Eri Asahi"	5:00
6.	"Yumiko Iwase × Izuru Kumasaka"	5:36
7.	"Kazumi Takayama × Masahide Ichii"	5:25
8.	"Himeka Nakamoto × Wataru Yamamoto"	3:47
9.	"Seira Nagashima × Junichi Harima"	5:01
10.	"Seira Hatanaka × Takahide Ishii"	3:30
11.	"Seira Miyazawa × Hisashi Kimura"	4:56
12.	"Rina Yamato × Tetsuya Satō"	4:57
13.	"Maaya Wada × Tomoyuki Fujiwara"	4:55
Total length:		59:56

=== Type-B ===
CD
No.	Title	Length
1.	"Guruguru Curtain" (ぐるぐるカーテン)	4:05
2.	"Hidarimune no Yuuki" (左胸の勇気)	4:55
3.	"Aitakatta Kamo Shirenai" (会いたかったかもしれない)	3:51
4.	"Guruguru Curtain off vocal ver." (ぐるぐるカーテン off vocal ver.)	4:05
5.	"Hidarimune no Yuuki off vocal ver." (左胸の勇気 off vocal ver.)	4:55
6.	"Aitakatta Kamo Shirenai off vocal ver." (会いたかったかもしれない off vocal ver.)	3:49
Total length:		25:40

DVD
No.	Title	Length
1.	"Guruguru Curtain Music Video"	4:14
2.	"Aitakatta Kamo Shirenai Music Video"	4:53
3.	"Aitakatta Kamo Shirenai (original cut ver.) Music Video"	4:32
4.	"Misa Etō × Keiji Kondō"	5:23
5.	"Yukina Kashiwa × Yōhei Osabe"	1:52
6.	"Hina Kawago × Atsuhiro Yamada"	3:12
7.	"Mahiro Kawamura × Tarō Okagawa"	3:15
8.	"Asuka Saitō × Flash Harry"	1:37
9.	"Chiharu Saitō × Ryōta Sakae"	5:01
10.	"Nanase Nishino × Yū Ōrai・Tomoyuki Tosu"	2:11
11.	"Nanami Hashimoto × Satoshi Miki"	2:46
12.	"Mai Fukagawa × Taikō Nakamura"	5:13
13.	"Sayuri Matsumura × Kentarō Hagiwara"	2:54
14.	"Yumi Wakatsuki × Takahiro Kanamori"	4:40
Total length:		51:43

=== Type-C ===
CD
No.	Title	Length
1.	"Guruguru Curtain" (ぐるぐるカーテン)	4:05
2.	"Hidarimune no Yuuki" (左胸の勇気)	4:55
3.	"Ushinaitaku Nai Kara" (失いたくないから)	4:18
4.	"Guruguru Curtain off vocal ver." (ぐるぐるカーテン off vocal ver.)	4:05
5.	"Hidarimune no Yuuki off vocal ver." (左胸の勇気 off vocal ver.)	4:55
6.	"Ushinaitaku Nai Kara" (失いたくないから off vocal ver.)	4:16
Total length:		26:34

DVD
No.	Title	Length
1.	"Guruguru Curtain Music Video"	4:14
2.	"Ushinaitaku Nai Kara Music Video"	5:08
3.	"Mikumo Andō × Kōsuke Kameyama・Kuroyanagi Keisuke"	5:03
4.	"Erika Ikuta × Yūichirō Hirakawa"	5:02
5.	"Rena Ichiki × Tatsuya Shiraishi"	4:29
6.	"Marika Itō × Shō Yanagisawa"	5:46
7.	"Yūri Saitō × Shinya Uchida"	5:39
8.	"Reika Sakurai × Ippei Morita"	2:55
9.	"Mai Shiraishi × Yūya Nara"	3:34
10.	"Kana Nakada × Akiko Takamatsu"	3:45
11.	"Ami Nōjō× Daisuke Satō"	3:50
12.	"Hina Higuchi × Hiroto Takahashi"	4:26
13.	"Minami Hoshino × Yūki Aoyama"	3:49
Total length:		57:40

=== Regular Edition ===
CD
No.	Title	Lyrics	Music	Artist(s)	Length
1.	"Guruguru Curtain" (ぐるぐるカーテン)	Yasushi Akimoto	Katsuhiko Kurosu	Rina Ikoma, et cetera	4:05
2.	"Hidarimune no Yuuki" (左胸の勇気)	Yasushi Akimoto	Yoshifumi Kouchi	Seira Hatanaka, et cetera	4:55
3.	"Shiroi Kumo ni Notte" (白い雲にのって)	Yasushi Akimoto	Michihiko Ōta	Rina Ikoma, et cetera	4:49
4.	"Guruguru Curtain off vocal ver." (ぐるぐるカーテン off vocal ver.)		Katsuhiko Kurosu		4:05
5.	"Hidarimune no Yuuki off vocal ver." (左胸の勇気 off vocal ver.)		Yoshifumi Kouchi		4:55
6.	"Shiroi Kumo ni Notte off vocal ver." (白い雲にのって off vocal ver.)		Michihiko Ōta		4:47
Total length:					27:36

== Chart and certifications ==
=== Oricon Charts ===
Release	Oricon Singles Chart	Peak position	Debut sales (copies)	Sales total (copies)
February 22, 2012	Daily Chart	1	84,905	210,513
February 22, 2012	Weekly Chart	2	136,309	210,513
February 22, 2012	Monthly Chart	4	155,821	210,513
February 22, 2012	Yearly Chart	29		210,513

=== Certifications ===
Region	Certification	Certified units/sales
Japan (RIAJ)	Platinum	250,000^{^}
^{^} Shipments figures based on certification alone.
