= Kimi no Na wa Kibō =

2013 single by Nogizaka46

- Regular edition cover

Single by Nogizaka46

from the album Tōmei na Iro
- B-side: "Shakiism"; "Romantic Ikayaki" (Type-A); "13nichi no Kinyōbi" (Type-B); "Dekopin" (Type-C); "Psychokinesis no Kanōsei" (Regular)
- Released: March 13, 2013
- Genre: J-pop
- Length: 27:16
- Label: N46Div.
- Songwriters: Katsuhiko Sugiyama; Kensuke Okamoto; Shinkoh Ogura
- Producer: Yasushi Akimoto

Nogizaka46 singles chronology
| "Seifuku no Mannequin" (2012) | "Kimi no Na wa Kibō" (2013) | "Girl's Rule" (2013) |

"Kimi no Na wa Kibō" (Japanese: 君の名は希望; "Your name is hope") is the fifth single by Japanese girl group Nogizaka46. It was number one on the Oricon weekly singles chart. It reached number three on the Billboard Japan Hot 100. On December 31, 2015, Nogizaka46 appeared on the 66th NHK Kōhaku Uta Gassen for the first time and sang this song.

== Release ==
This single was released in 4 versions. Type-A, Type-B, Type-C and a regular edition. The center position in the choreography for the title song is held by Rina Ikoma.

== Track listing ==
=== Type-A ===
CD
| No. | Title | Length |
|---|---|---|
| 1. | "Kimi no Na wa Kibō" (君の名は希望) | 5:25 |
| 2. | "Shakiism" (シャキイズム) | 4:12 |
| 3. | "Romantic Ikayaki" (ロマンティックいか焼き) | 4:29 |
| 4. | "Kimi no Na wa Kibō off vocal ver." (君の名は希望 off vocal ver.) | 5:25 |
| 5. | "Shakiism off vocal ver." (シャキイズム off vocal ver.) | 4:12 |
| 6. | "Romantic Ikayaki off vocal ver." (ロマンティックいか焼き off vocal ver.) | 4:28 |

DVD
| No. | Title | Length |
|---|---|---|
| 1. | "Kimi no Na wa Kibō Music Video" |
| 2. | "Shakiism Music Video" |
| 3. | "Rina Ikoma × Kazuaki Seki" |
| 4. | "Rena Ichiki × Santa Yamagishi" |
| 5. | "Nene Itō × Wataru Yamamoto" |
| 6. | "Marika Itō × Maki Fukushima" |
| 7. | "Misa Etō × Keisuke Kuroyanagi" |
| 8. | "Hina Kawago × Yūichirō Satō" |
| 9. | "Mai Shiraishi × Ippei Morita" |
| 10. | "Kazumi Takayama × Shigeki Kaneko" |
| 11. | "Hina Higuchi × Hiroki Horanai" |
| 12. | "Seira Miyazawa × Ryō Morita" |
| 13. | "Yumi Wakatsuki × Hiroyuki Uchimura" |

=== Type-B ===
CD
| No. | Title | Length |
|---|---|---|
| 1. | "Kimi no Na wa Kibō" (君の名は希望) | 5:25 |
| 2. | "Shakiism" (シャキイズム) | 4:12 |
| 3. | "13nichi no Kinyōbi" (13日の金曜日) | 3:42 |
| 4. | "Kimi no Na wa Kibō off vocal ver." (君の名は希望 off vocal ver.) | 5:25 |
| 5. | "Shakiism off vocal ver." (シャキイズム off vocal ver.) | 4:12 |
| 6. | "13nichi no Kinyōbi off vocal ver." (13日の金曜日 off vocal ver.) | 3:41 |

DVD
| No. | Title | Length |
|---|---|---|
| 1. | "Kimi no Na wa Kibō Music Video" |
| 2. | "13nichi no Kinyōbi Music Video" |
| 3. | "Erika Ikuta × Yūki Aoyama" |
| 4. | "Sayuri Inoue × Tsubasa Kayasuga" |
| 5. | "Yukina Kashiwa × Kazuma Ikeda" |
| 6. | "Asuka Saitō × Kōji Hagiuda" |
| 7. | "Chiharu Saitō × Yoshimasa Ōhashi" |
| 8. | "Yūri Saitō × Chisa Takano" |
| 9. | "Reika Sakurai × Taikō Nakamura" |
| 10. | "Seira Nagashima × Taishi Mizumoto" |
| 11. | "Nanami Hashimoto × Hiroaki Yuasa" |
| 12. | "Mai Fukagawa × Tarō Okagawa" |
| 13. | "Maaya Wada × Takahide Ishii+KAI(Tangent)" |

=== Type-C ===
CD
| No. | Title | Length |
|---|---|---|
| 1. | "Kimi no Na wa Kibō" (君の名は希望) | 5:25 |
| 2. | "Shakiism" (シャキイズム) | 4:12 |
| 3. | "Dekopin" (でこぴん) | 4:42 |
| 4. | "Kimi no Na wa Kibō off vocal ver." (君の名は希望 off vocal ver.) | 5:25 |
| 5. | "Shakiism off vocal ver." (シャキイズム off vocal ver.) | 4:12 |
| 6. | "Dekopin off vocal ver." (でこぴん off vocal ver.) | 4:41 |

DVD
| No. | Title | Length |
|---|---|---|
| 1. | "Kimi no Na wa Kibō Music Video" |
| 2. | "Dekopin Music Video" |
| 3. | "Manatsu Akimoto × Flash Harry" |
| 4. | "Mikumo Andō × Takeju Kitajima" |
| 5. | "Mahiro Kawamura × Isao Okuhira" |
| 6. | "Kana Nakada × Daisuke Kondō" |
| 7. | "Himeka Nakamoto × Hideaki Fukui" |
| 8. | "Nanase Nishino × Fumio Moriya" |
| 9. | "Ami Nōjō × Makoto Nagao" |
| 10. | "Seira Hatanaka × Fujimaru Totsuka" |
| 11. | "Minami Hoshino × Takayuki Hayashi" |
| 12. | "Sayuri Matsumura × Daisuke Tsuda" |
| 13. | "Rina Yamato × Kazuya Murayama" |

=== Regular Edition ===
CD
| No. | Title | Lyrics | Music | Artist(s) | Length |
|---|---|---|---|---|---|
| 1. | "Kimi no Na wa Kibō" (君の名は希望) | Yasushi Akimoto | Katsuhiko Sugiyama | Rina Ikoma, et cetera | 5:25 |
| 2. | "Shakiism" (シャキイズム) | Yasushi Akimoto | Kensuke Okamoto | Rina Ikoma, et cetera | 4:12 |
| 3. | "Psychokinesis no Kanōsei" (サイコキネシスの可能性) | Yasushi Akimoto | Katsuhiko Sugiyama, Shinkoh Ogura | Reika Sakurai, et cetera | 4:00 |
| 4. | "Kimi no Na wa Kibō off vocal ver." (君の名は希望 off vocal ver.) | | Katsuhiko Sugiyama | | 5:25 |
| 5. | "Shakiism off vocal ver." (シャキイズム off vocal ver.) | | Kensuke Okamoto | | 4:12 |
| 6. | "Psychokinesis no Kanōsei off vocal ver." (サイコキネシスの可能性 off vocal ver.) | | Katsuhiko Sugiyama, Shinkoh Ogura | | 3:59 |

== Use as station departure melody ==
"Kimi no Na wa Kibō" is to be used as the departure melody on the platforms of Nogizaka Station on the Tokyo Metro Chiyoda Line from spring 2016.

== Chart and certifications ==
=== Weekly charts ===
| Chart (2013) | Peak position |
|---|---|
| Japan (Oricon Weekly Singles Chart) | 1 |
| Japan (Billboard Japan Hot 100) | 3 |

=== Year-end charts ===
| Chart (2013) | Peak position |
|---|---|
| Japan (Oricon Yearly Singles Chart) | 22 |

=== Certifications ===
| Region | Certification | Certified units/sales |
|---|---|---|
| Japan (RIAJ) | Platinum | 250,000^{^} |
^{^} Shipments figures based on certification alone.
