= Sayuri Matsumura =

Japanese actress, television personality, and YouTuber (born 1992)

- 松村 沙友理
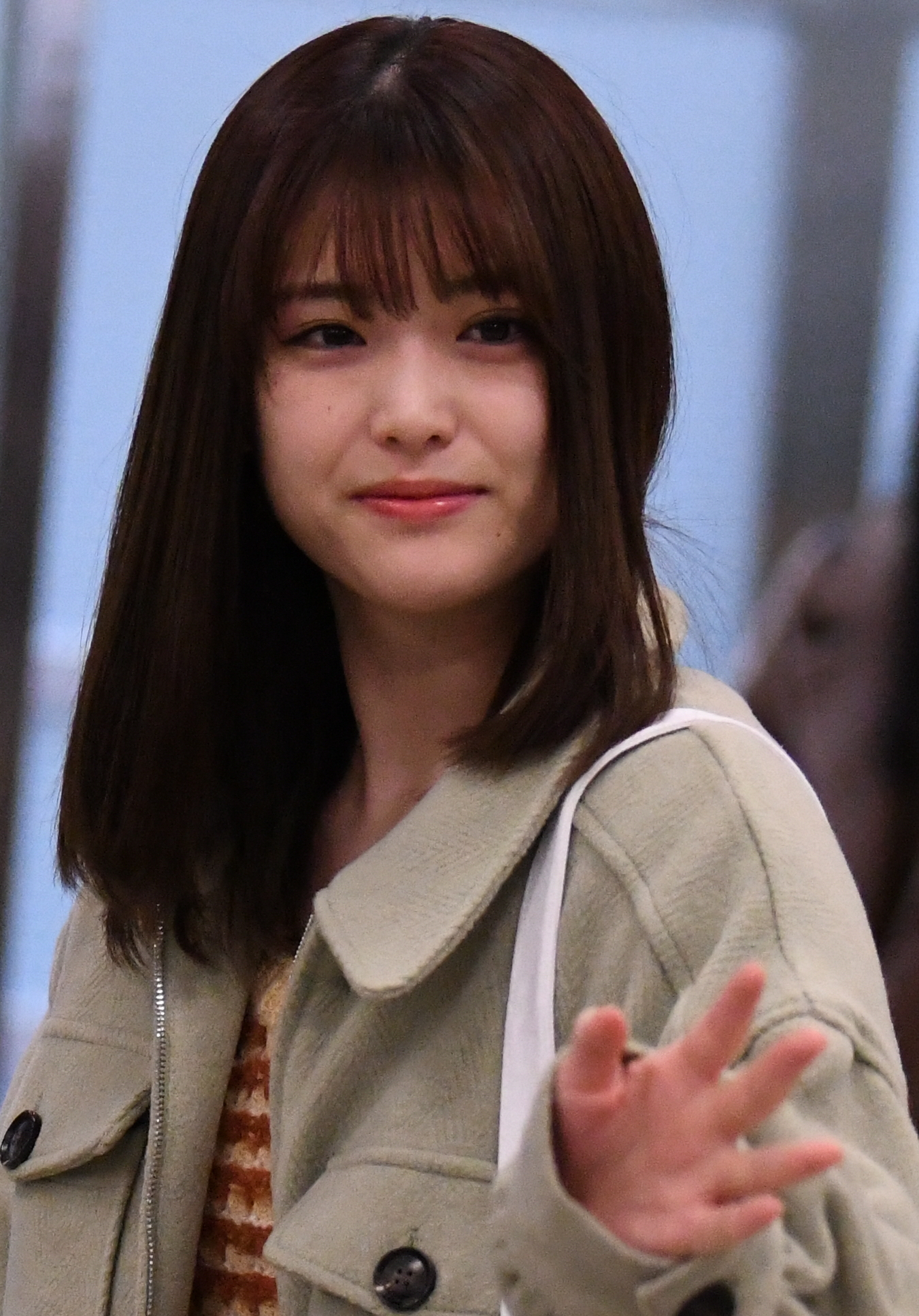
- Matsumura in 2020
- Born: August 27, 1992 (age 34); Osaka Prefecture, Japan
- Occupations: Actress; television personality; YouTuber
- Years active: 2011–present
- Agent: First Agent
- Spouse: Unknown (m. 2025)
- Children: 1
- Musical career
- Genres: J-pop
- Instruments: Vocals; guitar
- Years active: 2011–2021
- Label: Sony Records/N46Div
- Formerly of: Nogizaka46
- Website: matsumurasayuri.jp

Sayuri Matsumura (松村 沙友理, Matsumura Sayuri; born August 27, 1992) is a Japanese actress, television personality, and YouTuber. She is a former first generation member of the idol girl group Nogizaka46.

She is affiliated with First Agent.

== Career ==
In 2011, Matsumura auditioned for Nogizaka46 and was chosen as one of the first generation members. Her audition song was Yui's "Feel My Soul". She was chosen as one of the members performing on their debut single "Guruguru Curtain" and took the middle position for that song. The single was released on February 22, 2012. In April 2013, she regularly appeared on the television drama Bad Boys J with other Nogizaka46 members. On March 23, 2015, she was chosen as an exclusive model for the women's fashion magazine CanCam along with former Nogizaka46 bandmate Nanami Hashimoto, who was also a first generation member.

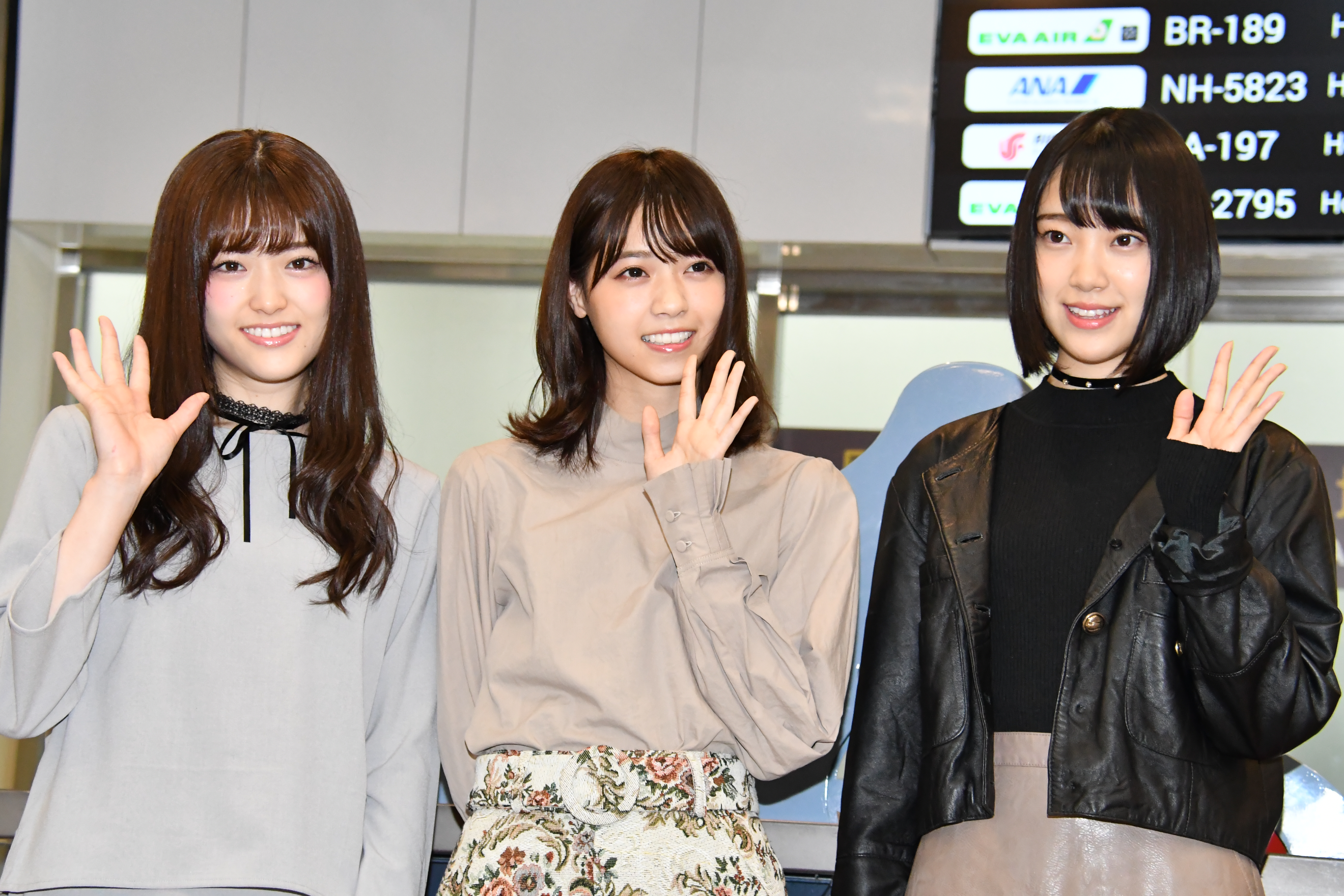
Matsumura (at the far left) with fellow Nogizaka46 members attending the Asia Fashion Award in 2016

In January 2021, she and fellow Nogizaka46 member Erika Ikuta performed a cover of the song "1・2・3" by Mafumafu and Soraru; the song was used as an opening theme to the anime series Pokémon Master Journeys: The Series. On April 15, 2021 Matsumura announced her graduation on her Niconico program Nama no Idol ga Suki (生のアイドルが好き). Her graduation concert was held at the Yokohama Arena on June 22 and 23, 2021. She officially graduated from the group on July 13, with her posting on its official blog for the last time that day. Her blog posts were deleted on August 19.

She also graduated from CanCam in that magazine's October issue, which was released on August 20.

On September 30, 2021, it was announced that Matsumura will become a regular model for the fashion magazine Baila in that magazine's November issue, released on October 12.

On August 27, 2023, Matsumura announced her transfer from Nogizaka46, LLC to Ikushima Planning Office. Her official fanclub and B4ND (pronounced "beyond") account were launched on the same day.

== Personal life ==
On December 3, 2025, Matsumura announced on her official social media accounts that she had gotten married and is expecting her first child. In March 12 of the following year, she announced that she had given birth. The gender of the baby was not disclosed.

== Discography ==
=== Singles with Nogizaka46 ===
Year	No.	Title	Role	Notes
2012	1	"Guruguru Curtain"	A-side	Debut as 1st Generation member; Also sang on "Nogizaka no Uta", "Aitakatta Kamoshirenai", "Ushinaitakunai kara" and "Shiroi Kumo ni Notte"
2012	2	"Oide Shampoo"	A-side	Also sang on "Kokoro no Kusuri", "Gūzen o Iiwake ni Shite" and "House!"
2012	3	"Hashire! Bicycle"	A-side	Also sang on "Sekkachi na Katatsumuri", "Hito wa Naze Hashiru no ka" and "Oto ga Denai Guitar"
2012	4	"Seifuku no Mannequin"	A-side	Also sang on "Oto ga Denai Guitar" and "Yubi Bōenkyō"
2013	5	"Kimi no Na wa Kibō"	A-side	Also sang on "Shakiism", "Romantic Ikayaki" and "Dekopin"
2013	6	"Girl's Rule"	A-side	Also sang on "Sekai de Ichiban Kodoku na Lover" and "Ningen to Iu Gakki"
2013	7	"Barrette"	A-side	Also sang on "Tsuki no Ōkisa", "Sonna Baka na…" and "Yasashisa to wa"
2014	8	"Kizuitara Kataomoi"	A-side	Also sang on "Romance no Start", "Toiki no Method" and "Dankeschön"
2014	9	"Natsu no Free & Easy"	A-side	Also sang on "Nani mo Dekizu ni Soba ni Iru" and "Sono Saki no Deguchi"
2014	10	"Nandome no Aozora ka?"	A-side	Also sang on "Korogatta Kane o Narase!" and "Tender Days"
2015	11	"Inochi wa Utsukushii"	A-side	Also sang on "Tachinaorichū"
2015	12	"Taiyō Nokku"	A-side	Also sang on "Muhyōjō" and "Hane no Kioku"
2015	13	"Ima, Hanashitai Dareka ga Iru"	A-side	Also sang on "Popipappapā" and "Kanashimi no Wasurekata"
2016	14	"Harujion ga Sakukoro"	A-side	Also sang on "Kyūshamen"
2016	15	"Hadashi de Summer"	A-side	Also sang on "Boku Dake no Hikari" and "Hakumai Sama"
2016	16	"Sayonara no Imi"	A-side	Also sang on "Kodoku na Aozora"
2017	17	"Influencer"	A-side	Also sang on "Igai BREAK"
2017	18	"Nigemizu"	A-side	Also sang on "Onna wa Hitori ja Nemurenai", "Hito Natsu no Nagasa Yori…" and "Naitatte Iijanaika?"
2017	19	"Itsuka Dekiru kara Kyō Dekiru"	A-side	Also sang on "Fuminshō"
2018	20	"Synchronicity"	A-side	Also sang on "Against" as 1st Generation member
2018	21	"Jikochū de Ikō!"	A-side	Also sang on "Soratobira" and "Anna ni Sukidatta no ni…"
2018	22	"Kaerimichi wa Tōmawari Shitaku Naru"	A-side	Also sang on "Chopin no Usotsuki"
2019	23	"Sing Out!"	A-side	Also sang on "Aimai"
2019	24	"Yoake Made Tsuyogaranakutemoii"	A-side	Also sang on "Boku no Koto, Shitteru?" and "Boku no Omoikomi"
2020	25	"Shiawase no Hogoshoku"	A-side	Also sang on "Sayonara Stay With Me"
2020	—	"Sekaijū no Rinjin yo"	—	Charity song during the COVID-19 pandemic
2020	—	"Route 246"	—	
2021	26	"Boku wa Boku o Suki ni Naru"	A-side	Also sang on "Ashita ga Aru Riyū" and "Wilderness World"
2021	27	"Gomen ne Fingers Crossed"	A-side	Last single to participate. Also sang on "Zenbu Yume no Mama" and "Sa~ Yu~ Ready?", which was her graduation song.

=== Albums with Nogizaka46 ===
Year	No.	Title	Participated song
2015	1	Tōmei na Iro	"Boku ga Iru Basho"; "Kakumei no Uma"
2016	2	Sorezore no Isu	"Kikkake"; "Taiyō ni Kudokarete"; "Kūkikan"
2017	3	Umarete Kara Hajimete Mita Yume	"Skydiving"; "Settei Ondo"; "Ryūsei Discotic"
2019	4	Ima ga Omoide ni Naru made	"Arigachi na Ren'ai"; "Sayuringo Boshūchū"

=== Other featured songs ===
Year	Artist	Title	Albums / Singles
2012	Mayu Watanabe	"Twin Tail wa Mō Shinai"	"Otona Jellybeans"
2016	AKB48	"Mazariau Mono"	"Kimi wa Melody"
2016	HoneyWorks	"Daikirai na Hazu Datta."	Non-album single

== Filmography ==
=== Television ===
Year	Title	Role	Notes	Ref.
2013	Bad Boys J	Mika Fujii		
2015	Tenshi no Knife	Cafe worker		
2015	Hatsumori Bemars	Yūutsu		
2017	Shounen Ashibe: Go! Go! Goma-chan	Swan/Hirao (voice)		
2017	Clione no Akari	Minori Amamiya (voice)		
2018	SNS Police	(voice)		
2019	Kakeguri – Compulsive Gambler	Yumemi Yumemite	Season 2	
2021	Promise Cinderella	Mahiro Sakamura		
2022	If My Favorite Pop Idol Made It to the Budokan, I Would Die	Eripiyo	Lead role	
2023	My Personal Weatherman	Kanami Matsudaira		
2024	How to Grill Our Love	Chihiro Yamaguchi	Lead role	

=== Films ===
Year	Title	Role	Notes	Ref.
2013	Bad Boys J: Saigo ni Mamoru Mono	Mika Fujii		
2016	Suki ni Naru Sono Shunkan o	Kako (voice)		
2017	Asahinagu	Sakura Konno		
2019	Kakegurui – Compulsive Gambler	Yumemi Yumemite		
2019	Tokyo Wine Party People		Lead role	
2021	Kakegurui – Compulsive Gambler Part 2	Yumemi Yumemite		
2021	Will I Be Single Forever?	Miho		
2023	If My Favorite Pop Idol Made It to the Budokan, I Would Die	Eripiyo		

=== Japanese dub ===
Year	Title	Role	Notes	Ref.
2017	The Dragon Spell	Nicky Tanner		

=== Theater ===
Year	Title	Role	Venue	Ref.
2015	Joshiraku	Marii Buratei	AiiA 2.5 Theater Tokyo	
2015	Subete no Inu wa Tengoku e Iku		AiiA 2.5 Theater Tokyo	
2016	Joshiraku 2: Toki Kakesoba	Tetora Bōhatei	AiiA 2.5 Theater Tokyo	
2017	FILL-IN: Musume no Band ni Oya ga Deru		Kinokuniya Hall	

== Bibliography ==
=== Magazines ===
- CanCam, Shogakukan 1981-, as an exclusive model from the May 2015 issue to the October 2021 issue
- Baila, Shueisha 2001-, as a regular model since November 2021 issue

=== Photobooks ===
- Kikan Nogizaka vol.4 Saitō (December 26, 2014, Tokyo News Service) ISBN 9784863364516
- Igai tte iuka, Mae kara kawaii to omotteta (December 12, 2017, Shogakukan) ISBN 9784096822623
