= Oide Shampoo =

2012 single by Nogizaka46

- Regular edition cover

Single by Nogizaka46

from the album Tōmei na Iro
- B-side: "Kokoro no Kusuri"; "Gūzen o Iiwake ni Shite" (Type-A); "Mizutama Moyou" (Type-B); "Ōkami ni Kuchibue o" (Type-C); "House!" (Regular)
- Released: May 2, 2012
- Genre: J-pop
- Length: 4:08
- Label: N46Div.
- Songwriters: Dai Odagiri; MIKOTO; y@suo ohtani
- Producer: Yasushi Akimoto

Nogizaka46 singles chronology
"Guruguru Curtain" (2012)	"Oide Shampoo" (2012)	"Hashire! Bicycle" (2012)

"Oide Shampoo" (Japanese: おいでシャンプー, Hepburn: Oide Shanpū; "Come on shampoo") is the second single by Japanese girl group Nogizaka46, released on May 2, 2012. It reached number one in the Oricon Weekly Chart. It sold 156,000 copies. It reached number two on the Billboard Japan Hot 100.

== Release ==
This single was released in 4 versions. Type-A, Type-B, Type-C and a regular edition. The first three editions are CD+DVD. Rina Ikoma's first solo song Mizutama Moyou is included in Type-B. The center position in the choreography for the title song is held by Rina Ikoma.

== Track listing ==
=== Type-A ===
CD
No.	Title	Length
1.	"Oide Shampoo" (おいでシャンプー)	4:08
2.	"Kokoro no Kusuri" (心の薬)	3:46
3.	"Gūzen o Iiwake ni Shite" (偶然を言い訳にして)	4:37
4.	"Oide Shampoo off vocal ver." (おいでシャンプー off vocal ver.)	4:08
5.	"Kokoro no Kusuri off vocal ver." (心の薬 off vocal ver.)	3:46
6.	"Gūzen o Iiwake ni Shite off vocal ver." (偶然を言い訳にして off vocal ver.)	4:36

DVD
No.	Title	Length
1.	"Oide Shampoo Music Video"
2.	"Gūzen o Iiwake ni Shite Music Video"
3.	"Erika Ikuta × Hiroshū"
4.	"Marika Itō × Sayaka Arimoto・Maki Yamamoto"
5.	"Misa Etō × Takashi Ninomiya"
6.	"Hina Kawago × Atsuhiro Yamada"
7.	"Mahiro Kawamura × Nao Watanabe"
8.	"Asuka Saitō × Kumiko Asō・Kazuhito Yamada"
9.	"Chiharu Saitō × Miyuki Ōgata"
10.	"Yūri Saitō × Ryota Sakae"
11.	"Reika Sakurai × Hiroyuki Uchimura"
12.	"Nanase Nishino × Kentarō Hagiwara"
13.	"Sayuri Matsumura × Yūichirō Satō"

=== Type-B ===
CD
No.	Title	Length
1.	"Oide Shampoo" (おいでシャンプー)	4:08
2.	"Kokoro no Kusuri" (心の薬)	3:46
3.	"Mizutama Moyou" (水玉模様)	3:51
4.	"Oide Shampoo off vocal ver." (おいでシャンプー off vocal ver.)	4:08
5.	"Kokoro no Kusuri off vocal ver." (心の薬 off vocal ver.)	3:46
6.	"Mizutama Moyou off vocal ver." (水玉模様 off vocal ver.)	3:50

DVD
No.	Title	Length
1.	"Oide Shampoo Music Video"
2.	"Mizutama Moyou Music Video"
3.	"Mikumo Andō × Ikki Matsuda"
4.	"Rina Ikoma × Yūki Aoyama"
5.	"Rena Ichiki × Yasunori Kakegawa"
6.	"Yumiko Iwase × Kazuya Murayama"
7.	"Yukina Kashiwa × Takuma Aomatsu"
8.	"Kazumi Takayama × Hiroki Matsumoto"
9.	"Seira Nagashima × Takahide Ishii"
10.	"Nanami Hashimoto × Tōru Sugimoto"
11.	"Seira Hatanaka × Daisuke Satō"
12.	"Rina Yamato × Flash Harry"
13.	"Maaya Wada × Masayuki Iwamoto"

=== Type-C ===
CD
No.	Title	Length
1.	"Oide Shampoo" (おいでシャンプー)	4:08
2.	"Kokoro no Kusuri" (心の薬)	3:46
3.	"Ōkami ni Kuchibue o" (狼に口笛を)	2:58
4.	"Oide Shampoo off vocal ver." (おいでシャンプー off vocal ver.)	4:08
5.	"Kokoro no Kusuri off vocal ver." (心の薬 off vocal ver.)	3:46
6.	"Ōkami ni Kuchibue o off vocal ver." (狼に口笛を off vocal ver.)	2:57

DVD
No.	Title	Length
1.	"Oide Shampoo Music Video"
2.	"Ōkami ni Kuchibue o Music Video"
3.	"Nene Itō × Yukinori Dehara"
4.	"Sayuri Inoue × Ippei Morita"
5.	"Mai Shiraishi × Ai Nagasaki"
6.	"Kana Nakada × Makoto Tezuka"
7.	"Himeka Nakamoto × Junichi Matsumoto"
8.	"Ami Nōjō × Masato Suzuki"
9.	"Hina Higuchi × Keita Ikeda"
10.	"Mai Fukagawa × Kazuhiro Irie"
11.	"Minami Hoshino × Kotori Kawashima・Kentarō Minoura"
12.	"Seira Miyazawa × Katsuo"
13.	"Yumi Wakatsuki × Tarō Okagawa"

=== Regular Edition ===
CD
No.	Title	Lyrics	Music	Artist(s)	Length
1.	"Oide Shampoo" (おいでシャンプー)	Yasushi Akimoto	Dai Odagiri	Rina Ikoma, et cetera	4:08
2.	"Kokoro no Kusuri" (心の薬)	Yasushi Akimoto	MIKOTO	Rina Ikoma, et cetera	3:46
3.	"House!" (ハウス!)	Yasushi Akimoto	y@suo ohtani	Rina Ikoma, et cetera	5:07
4.	"Oide Shampoo off vocal ver." (おいでシャンプー off vocal ver.)		Dai Odagiri		4:08
5.	"Kokoro no Kusuri off vocal ver." (心の薬 off vocal ver.)		MIKOTO		3:46
6.	"House! off vocal ver." (ハウス! off vocal ver.)		y@suo ohtani		5:06

== Chart and certifications ==
=== Oricon Charts ===
Release	Oricon Singles Chart	Peak position	Debut sales (copies)	Sales total (copies)
August 22, 2012	Daily Chart	1	111,222	221,193
August 22, 2012	Weekly Chart	1	155,677	221,193
August 22, 2012	Monthly Chart	2	155,677	221,193
August 22, 2012	Yearly Chart	28		221,193

=== Certifications ===
Region	Certification	Certified units/sales
Japan (RIAJ)	Platinum	250,000^{^}
^{^} Shipments figures based on certification alone.
