= Hashire! Bicycle =

2012 single by Nogizaka46

- Regular edition cover

Single by Nogizaka46

from the album Tōmei na Iro
- B-side: "Sekkachi na Katatsumuri"; "Namida ga Mada Kanashimi Datta Koro" (Type-A); "Hito wa Naze Hashiru no ka?" (Type-B); "Oto ga Denai Guitar" (Type-C); "Kairyuu no Shimayo" (Regular)
- Released: August 22, 2012
- Genre: J-pop
- Length: 3:42
- Label: N46Div.
- Songwriters: Shusui; Katsuhiko Yamamoto; Akira Sunset
- Producer: Yasushi Akimoto

Nogizaka46 singles chronology
"Oide Shampoo" (2012)	"Hashire! Bicycle" (2012)	"Seifuku no Mannequin" (2012)

"Hashire! Bicycle" (Japanese: 走れ! Bicycle; "Run! Bicycle") is the third single by Japanese girl group Nogizaka46, released on August 22, 2012. It debuted in number one on the weekly Oricon Singles Chart. It also reached number one on the Billboard Japan Hot 100. The coupling song "Hito wa Naze Hashiru no ka?" was used as an official theme song for 2012 FIFA U-20 Women's World Cup.

== Release ==
This single was released in 4 versions. Type-A, Type-B, Type-C and a regular edition. The center position in the choreography for the title song is held by Rina Ikoma.

== Track listing ==
=== Type-A ===
CD
No.	Title	Length
1.	"Hashire! Bicycle" (走れ! Bicycle)	3:42
2.	"Sekkachi na Katatsumuri" (せっかちなかたつむり)	5:07
3.	"Namida ga Mada Kanashimi Datta Koro" (涙がまだ悲しみだった頃)	4:20
4.	"Hashire! Bicycle off vocal ver." (走れ! Bicycle off vocal ver.)	3:42
5.	"Sekkachi na Katatsumuri off vocal ver." (せっかちなかたつむり off vocal ver.)	5:07
6.	"Namida ga Mada Kanashimi Datta Koro off vocal ver." (涙がまだ悲しみだった頃 off vocal ver.)	4:19

DVD
No.	Title	Length
1.	"Hashire! Bicycle Music Video"
2.	"Namida ga Mada Kanashimi Datta Koro Music Video"
3.	"Rina Ikoma × Yūka Katsuki"
4.	"Nene Itō × Yūichirō Satō"
5.	"Sayuri Inoue × Maywa Denki"
6.	"Yumiko Iwase × Takeju Kitajima"
7.	"Hina Kawago × Atsushi Yamada"
8.	"Yūri Saitō × Kenji Shimada"
9.	"Seira Nagashima × Kazuya Murayama"
10.	"Hina Higuchi × Hiroshū"
11.	"Minami Hoshino × Izuru Kumasaka"
12.	"Sayuri Matsumura × Takuya Tada"
13.	"Yumi Wakatsuki × Yūki Aoyama"

=== Type-B ===
CD
No.	Title	Length
1.	"Hashire! Bicycle" (走れ! Bicycle)	3:42
2.	"Sekkachi na Katatsumuri" (せっかちなかたつむり)	5:06
3.	"Hito wa Naze Hashiru no ka?" (人はなぜ走るのか?)	5:05
4.	"Hashire! Bicycle off vocal ver." (走れ! Bicycle off vocal ver.)	3:42
5.	"Sekkachi na Katatsumuri off vocal ver." (せっかちなかたつむり off vocal ver.)	5:06
6.	"Hito wa Naze Hashiru no ka? off vocal ver." (人はなぜ走るのか? off vocal ver.)	4:51

DVD
No.	Title	Length
1.	"Hashire! Bicycle Music Video"
2.	"Hito wa Naze Hashiru no ka? Music Video"
3.	"Mikumo Andō × Norihito Nakayashiki"
4.	"Rena Ichiki × Keiichirō Hirano"
5.	"Yukina Kashiwa × Asao Inoue"
6.	"Asuka Saitō × Kenji Hiroike"
7.	"Kazumi Takayama × Ryō Morita"
8.	"Nanase Nishino × Taikō Nakamura"
9.	"Nanami Hashimoto × Shigeki Kaneko"
10.	"Seira Hatanaka × Yutaka Mizuochi"
11.	"Mai Fukagawa × JA Kitasorachi"
12.	"Rina Yamato × Taishi Mizumoto"
13.	"Maaya Wada × Sayuki Inoue"

=== Type-C ===
CD
No.	Title	Length
1.	"Hashire! Bicycle" (走れ! Bicycle)	3:42
2.	"Sekkachi na Katatsumuri" (せっかちなかたつむり)	5:06
3.	"Oto ga Denai Guitar" (音が出ないギター)	5:05
4.	"Hashire! Bicycle off vocal ver." (走れ! Bicycle off vocal ver.)	3:42
5.	"Sekkachi na Katatsumuri off vocal ver." (せっかちなかたつむり off vocal ver.)	5:06
6.	"Oto ga Denai Guitar off vocal ver." (音が出ないギター off vocal ver.)	4:51

DVD
No.	Title	Length
1.	"Hashire! Bicycle Music Video"
2.	"Oto ga Denai Guitar Music Video"
3.	"Erika Ikuta × Eiki Takahashi"
4.	"Marika Itō × Kenji Maruyama"
5.	"Misa Etō × Ban Kugimiya"
6.	"Mahiro Kawamura × Tomokazu Yamada"
7.	"Chiharu Saitō × Keita Ikeda"
8.	"Reika Sakurai × Akira Okimura"
9.	"Mai Shiraishi × Hiroyuki Uchimura"
10.	"Kana Nakada × Hideaki Fukui"
11.	"Himeka Nakamoto × Dankan"
12.	"Ami Nōjō × Ritsu Wada"
13.	"Seira Miyazawa × Kimika Onai"

=== Regular Edition ===
CD
No.	Title	Lyrics	Music	Artist(s)	Length
1.	"Hashire! Bicycle" (走れ! Bicycle)	Yasushi Akimoto	Shusui, Ryo ito, Atsushi Kimura, her0ism	Rina Ikoma, et cetera	3:42
2.	"Sekkachi na Katatsumuri" (せっかちなかたつむり)	Yasushi Akimoto	Katsuhiko Yamamoto	Sayuri Matsumura, et cetera	5:06
3.	"Kairyuu no Shimayo" (海流の島よ)	Yasushi Akimoto	Akira Sunset	Asuka Saitō, et cetera	4:02
4.	"Hashire! Bicycle off vocal ver." (走れ! Bicycle off vocal ver.)		Shusui, Ryo ito, Atsushi Kimura, her0ism		3:42
5.	"Sekkachi na Katatsumuri off vocal ver." (せっかちなかたつむり off vocal ver.)		Katsuhiko Yamamoto		5:06
6.	"Kairyuu no Shimayo off vocal ver." (海流の島よ off vocal ver.)		Akira Sunset		4:01

== Chart and certifications ==
=== Oricon Charts ===
Release	Oricon Singles Chart	Peak position	Debut sales (copies)	Sales total (copies)
August 22, 2012	Daily Chart	1	150,056	240,696
August 22, 2012	Weekly Chart	1	186,613	240,696
August 22, 2012	Monthly Chart	4	205,407	240,696
August 22, 2012	Yearly Chart	26		240,696

=== Certifications ===
Region	Certification	Certified units/sales
Japan (RIAJ)	Gold	100,000^{^}
^{^} Shipments figures based on certification alone.
