= Mai Fukagawa =

Japanese actress (born 1991)

- 深川 麻衣
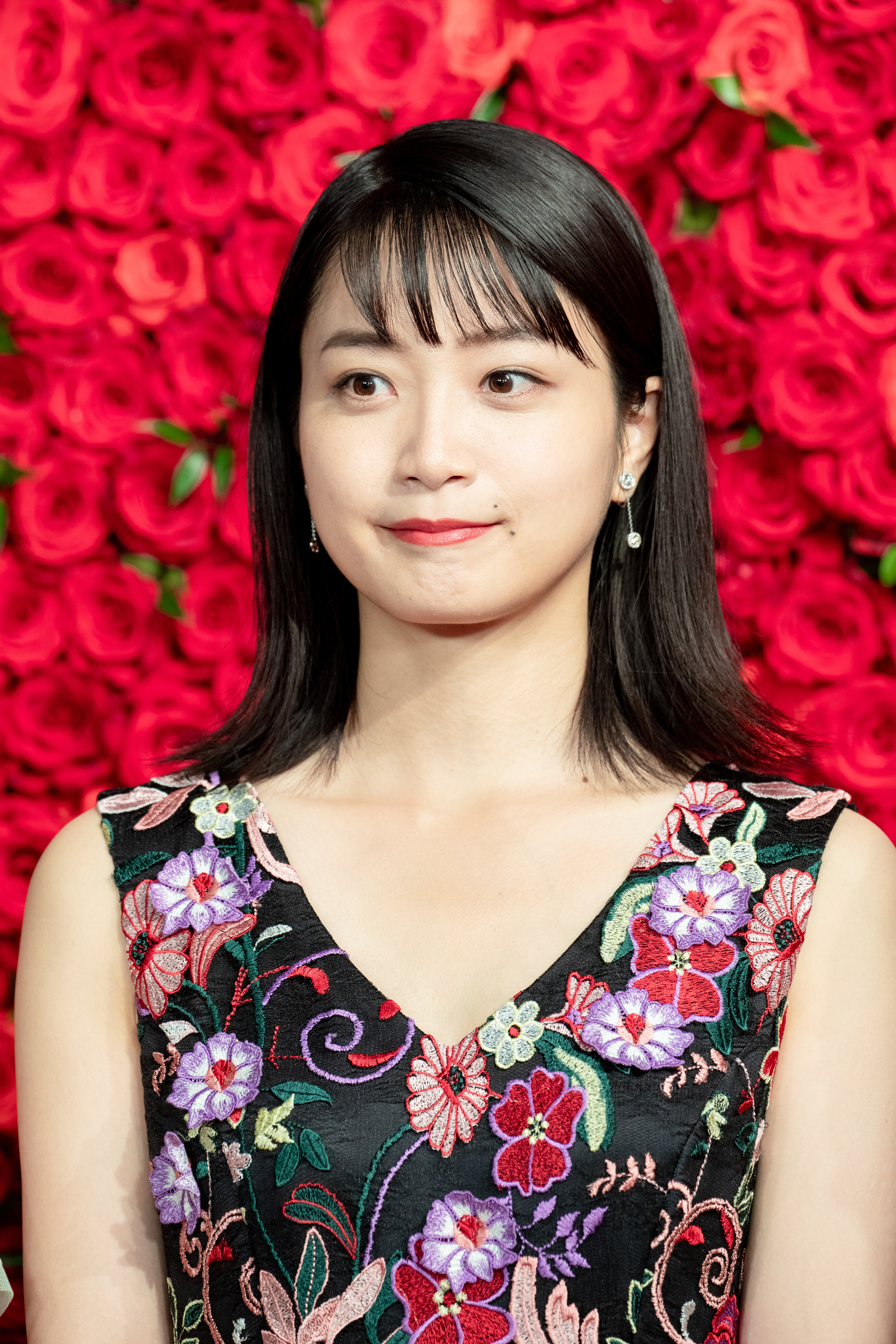
- Fukagawa in 2018
- Born: March 29, 1991 (age 35); Iwata, Shizuoka
- Occupation: Actress
- Years active: 2010–present
- Agent: Ten Carat
- Musical career
- Genre: J-pop
- Instrument: Vocals
- Years active: 2011–2016
- Label: N46Div.
- Formerly of: Nogizaka46
- Website: fukagawamai.com

Mai Fukagawa (Japanese: 深川 麻衣, Hepburn: Fukugawa Mai; born March 29, 1991) is a Japanese actress. She is a former member of the idol girl group Nogizaka46, debuting in 2011 as part of the first generation and graduating in 2016.

== Early life and education ==
Fukagawa was born on March 29, 1991, in Iwata, Shizuoka. She has an older brother. While in elementary school, she was a fan of Morning Musume. Although she wanted to become a member of Mini-Moni, she aspired to become an illustrator or Japanese confectioner. In junior high school, she became interested in the entertainment industry, and saw Water Boys 2 being filmed at her alma mater. She then enrolled in an arts high school and majored in design, studying oil and Japanese painting. In her first year of high school, she enrolled in the dance school Heroes Academy. After graduating from high school, she enrolled in a fashion vocational school in Nagoya.

== Career ==
=== 2010–2016: Early career and Nogizaka46 ===
In August 2010, Fukagawa won the Grand Prix at the modeling audition of kawaii EXPO 2010, sponsored by Lowrys Farm, and became an exclusive model for them. After discussing with her parents, her mother told her to try for a year and come back if it doesn't work but be financially independent. She moved to Tokyo after living in Nagoya for two years, and worked part-time while auditioning as an actress and model.

In August 2011, she passed Nogizaka46's first generation audition, having sung Aiko's "KissHug". As Nogizaka46's lessons were only on the weekends and part-time jobs were prohibited, Fukagawa struggled financially. In November, she started her official Nogizaka46 blog.

On February 22, 2012, Fukagawa made her musical debut on Nogizaka46's debut single "Guruguru Curtain", featuring on Type C for the songs "Hidarimune no Yuuki" and "Ushinaitaku Nai Kara". She was selected as a starting member for the first time on the group's third single, "Hashire! Bicycle".

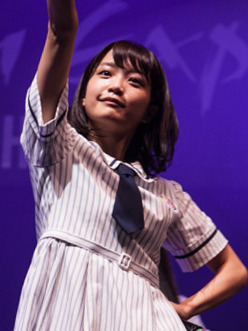
Fukagawa at the 2014 Japan Expo

In June 2014, she participated in the Nogizaka46 stage production 16 Principals. She began her first regular solo activity in October as a narrator for Milan TV Milano Milan.

Fukagawa participated in Nogizaka46's debut performance at the 66th NHK Kōhaku Uta Gassen, performing "Kimi no Na wa Kibō".

On January 5, 2016, fellow Nogizaka46 member Kazumi Takayama's short story "Carry-over", which Fukagawa illustrated, was published on the website of the magazine Da Vinci. Two days later, Fukagawa announced that she would be graduating from the group with their 14th single, "Harujion ga Sakukoro". She had the center position for the first time with the single, and released her only solo song, "Tsuyogaru Tsubomi", with the single. On June 4, Fukagawa had her last handshake event with the group, receiving her diploma from Reika Sakurai. Five days later, she released her first solo photobook, Zutto, Sobaniitai (ずっと、そばにいたい). The photobook recorded estimated weekly sales of nearly 29,000, and ranked second in the book category and first in the photobook category on the Oricon weekly rankings on June 20. Fukagawa graduated from the group on June 16 with a concert held at Ecopa Arena in Shizuoka. On July 1, her Nogizaka46 official blog was closed. The bonus backstage video from her graduation was released on July 27 as part of Nogizaka46's 15th single, "Hadashi de Summer".

=== 2016–present: Acting career ===
In September 2016, she moved to the agency Ten Carat, and began working as an actress. On November 21, she appeared on her first gravure cover as an actress for Big Comic Spirits.

In 2017, she took her first lead role in Skip. In 2018, she made her film debut in Bread, Bus, and the Second Hatsukoi. This role won her the Best Emerging Actress award at the 10th Tama Film Awards. Later that year, she appeared in Manpuku, her first asadora appearance.

In 2019, she starred in Nippon Boro Yado Journey. In 2021, she starred in the movie Omoide Shashin. Later that year, she appeared in her first taiga drama Reach Beyond the Blue Sky as Princess Kazu. Starting in April 2022, she appeared in Tokusō 9 as Yuma Takao.

On July 11, 2023, she was appointed as the "Shizuoka Iwata PR Ambassador" for her hometown of Iwata, Shizuoka.

== Discography ==
=== Singles with Nogizaka46 ===
| Year | No. | Title | Role | Notes |
|---|---|---|---|---|
| 2012 | 1 | "Guruguru Curtain" | C-side | Did not sing for title track. Sang on "Nogizaka no Uta", "Aitakatta Kamo Shirenai", "Hidarimune no Yuuki", and "Ushinaitaku Nai Kara". |
| 2012 | 2 | "Oide Shampoo" | C-side | Sang on the B-sides "Aitakatta Kamo Shirenai" and "Ōkami ni Kuchibue o". |
| 2012 | 3 | "Hashire! Bicycle" | A-side | Starting member. Sang on title track, "Sekkachi na Katatsumuri", "Hito wa Naze Hashiru no ka?", and "Oto ga Denai Guitar". |
| 2012 | 4 | "Seifuku no Mannequin" | A-side | Sang on title track, "Yubi Bōenkyō", and "Shibuya Blues". |
| 2013 | 5 | "Kimi no Na wa Kibō" | A-side | Sang on title track, "Shakiism", "Romantic Ikayaki", and "Dekopin". |
| 2013 | 6 | "Girls' Rule" | A-side | Sang on title track, "Sekai de Ichiban Kodoku na Lover", and "Ningen toiu Gakki". |
| 2013 | 7 | "Barrette" | A-side | Sang on title track, "Tsuki no Ōkisa", "Watashi no Tame ni Dareka no Tame ni", and "Sonna Baka na...". |
| 2014 | 8 | "Kizuitara Kataomoi" | A-side | Sang on title track, "Romance no Start", "Toiki no Method", "Toiki no Method", |
| 2014 | 9 | "Natsu no Free & Easy" | A-side | Sang on title track and "Sono Saki no Deguchi". |
| 2014 | 10 | "Nandome no Aozora ka?" | A-side | Sang on title track, "Korogatta Kane o Narase!", and "Tender days". |
| 2015 | 11 | "Inochi wa Utsukushii" | A-side | Sang on title track and "Tachinaori Chū". |
| 2015 | 12 | "Taiyō Knock" | A-side | Sang on title track, "Sakanatachi no LOVE SONG", and "Hane no Kioku". |
| 2015 | 13 | "Ima, Hanashitai Dareka ga Iru" | A-side | Sang on title track, "Popipappapā", and "Kanashimi no Wasurekata". |
| 2016 | 14 | "Harujion ga Sakukoro" | A-side | Center position. Sang for title track and "Tsuyogaru Tsubomi", her solo song. |

== Filmography ==
=== Film ===
| Year | Title | Role | Notes | Ref. |
|---|---|---|---|---|
| 2019 | Aircraft Carrier Ibuki | Shiori Moriyama | | |
| 2019 | Just Only Love | Yoko Sakamoto | | |
| 2020 | Gone Wednesday | Mizuno | | |
| 2021 | My Father's Tracks | Miho | | |
| 2021 | Photograph of Memories | Yūko Otosara | Lead role | |
| 2022 | Haw | Marina | | |
| 2022 | Once Hit the Bottom | Hiroko Seto | | |
| 2023 | The Ex-idol, Stuck in Life, Decided to Live with a Complete Stranger | Akiko | Lead role | |
| 2024 | The Parades | Mizuki | | |
| 2025 | Welcome to the Village | Anna | Lead role | |
| 2025 | Strangers in Kyoto | Madoka Shibusawa | Lead role | |
| 2026 | The Girl at the End of the Line | Ruriko | | |
| 2026 | The Imaginary Dog and the Lying Cat | Kanako Toyama | | |
| 2026 | All the Lovers in the Night | Noriko Hayakawa | | |
| 2026 | Nigero Ojosan | Maiko Ayukawa | | |
| 2027 | The Book of Seventeen | Momoka | | |

=== Television ===
| Year | Title | Role | Notes | Ref. |
|---|---|---|---|---|
| 2015 | Hatsumori Bemars | Kāchan | | |
| 2015 | Burning Flower | Member of Okugoten | Taiga drama | |
| 2018–2019 | Manpuku | Yoshino Kōda | Asadora | |
| 2021 | Reach Beyond the Blue Sky | Princess Kazu | Taiga drama | |
| 2023 | Giver Taker | Riko Tsubaki | | |
| 2023 | The Crimes of Those Women | Mayumi Himura | Lead role | |
| 2026 | Tokyo Mid 30s | Kaoruko Nagano | | |
