= Summer Nude =

- Genre: Romance; Drama
- Directed by: Yusuke Ishii; Shogo Miyaki; Hiro Kanai
- Starring: Tomohisa Yamashita; Erika Toda; Karina Nose
- Country of origin: Japan
- Original language: Japanese
- No. of episodes: 11

Production
- Producer: Ken Murase
- Running time: 54 minutes, Mondays at 21:00 (JST)
- Production company: Fuji Television

Original release
- Network: Fuji Television
- Release: July 8 – September 16, 2013

Summer Nude is a 2013 Japanese television series that aired on Fuji Television on Mondays at 21:00 (JST) from July 8 to September 16, 2013. It starred Tomohisa Yamashita, Erika Toda and Karina Nose.

== Cast ==
- Tomohisa Yamashita as Asahi Mikuriya / 三厨 朝日
- Erika Toda as Hanae Taniyama / 谷山 波奈江
- Karina Nose as Natsuki Chiyohara / 千代原 夏希
- Masami Nagasawa as Kasumi Ichikura / 一倉 香澄
- Ryo Katsuji as Takashi Yaino / 矢井野 孝至
- Masataka Kubota as Hikaru Kirihata / 桐畑 光
- Shori Sato as Hayao Taniyama / 谷山 駿
- Mizuki Yamamoto as Aoi Horikiri / 堀切 あおい
- Yudai Chiba as Haruo Yoneda / 米田 春夫
- Ayami Nakajō as Mami Ichise / 一瀬 麻美
- Nanami Hashimoto as Kiyoko Ishikari / 石狩 清子
- Katsunori Takahashi as Kenji Shimojima / 下嶋 賢二
- Yuka Itaya as Setsuko Shimojima / 下嶋 勢津子
- Shigeru Saiki as Fumihiro Kominami /小南 文博

== Episodes ==
Episode #	Broadcast date	Episode title	Romanized title	Rating
1	July 8, 2013	走り出す恋！ 夏の大三角関係ラブストーリー始まる	Hashiridasu koi! Natsunodaisankaku kankei rabusutōrī hajimaru	17.4%
2	July 15, 2013	海の日15分拡大SP・片想いの連鎖…どしゃ降り雨とうれし涙	Uminohi 15-bu kakudai SP kataomoi no rensa… doshaburi ame to ureshinamida	12.8%
3	July 22, 2013	明かされた秘密！ それでも君を愛してる	Akasa reta himitsu! Soredemo kimi o aishi teru	10.8%
4	July 29, 2013	好きになってるじゃん、私	Suki ni natterujan, watashi	13.4%
5	August 5, 2013	友情と恋…あなたはどちらを選びますか？	Yūjō to koi… anata wa dochira o erabimasu ka?	11.7%
6	August 12, 2013	さよなら大好きな人…運命の再会と十年愛の結末	Sayonaradaisukinahito… unmei no saikai to jūnen'ai no ketsumatsu	12.0%
7	August 19, 2013	離れている方が心の距離は近くなる？	Hanarete iru kata ga kokoro no kyori wa chikaku naru?	11.1%
8	August 26, 2013	好きになってるじゃん、俺	Suki ni natterujan, ore	11.7%
9	September 2, 2013	10分でも会いたい	10-Bu demo aitai	12.6%
10	September 9, 2013	抱きしめられて	Dakishime rarete	12.4%
11	September 16, 2013	裸になれた夏…ずっとそばにいるから	Hadaka ni nareta natsu… zutto soba ni irukara	11.9%
Average viewing ratings: 12.7%
