= Burning Flower =

2015 taiga drama about Sugi Fumi, a sister of the scholar Yoshida Shōin

- Promotional poster
- Written by: Satomi Ōshima; Yūko Miyamura
- Directed by: Yoshio Watanabe; Hajime Suenaga
- Starring: Mao Inoue; Takao Osawa; Yusuke Iseya; Kengo Kora; Masahiro Higashide; Taizo Harada; Yūka; Rena Tanaka; Kōji Seto; Hitori Gekidan; Mayumi Wakamura; Kanji Ishimaru; Haruka Igawa; Tsuyoshi Ihara; Noriyuki Higashiyama; Takashi Naitō; Fumi Dan; Eiji Okuda; Kyōzō Nagatsuka; Tōru Emori; Keiko Matsuzaka; Hideki Takahashi; Kin'ya Kitaōji; Yoshiko Mita
- Narrated by: Shūichi Ikeda
- Theme music composer: Tatsuya Shimono
- Opening theme: NHK Symphony Orchestra
- Composer: Kenji Kawai
- Country of origin: Japan
- Original language: Japanese
- No. of episodes: 50

Production
- Executive producers: Katsuhiro Tsuchiya; Masayo Komatsu
- Running time: 45 minutes

Original release
- Network: NHK
- Release: January 4 – December 13, 2015

Burning Flower (花燃ゆ, Hanamoyu) is a 2015 Japanese historical drama television series, the 54th NHK taiga drama. The series stars Mao Inoue as Sugi Fumi, a sister of Meiji Restoration scholar Yoshida Shōin. It premiered on January 4, 2015, and ended on December 13, 2015.

== Plot ==
The series depicts the Meiji Restoration, occurring during the last years of the Bakufu Shogunate and the early years of the Meiji Era, through the point of view of Sugi Fumi (ja), the younger sister of Yoshida Shōin.

== Cast ==
=== Sugi family ===
- Mao Inoue as Sugi Fumi (later Katori Miwako)
  - Momoka Yamada as young Fumi
- Yusuke Iseya as Yoshida Shōin, Shishi of Bakumatsu era, Fumi's second eldest brother
  - Rihito Itagaki as young Shōin
- Kyōzō Nagatsuka as Sugi Yurinosuke, Fumi's father
- Fumi Dan as Sugi Taki, Fumi's mother
- Eiji Okuda as Tamaki Bun'noshin, Fumi's uncle
- Taizo Harada as Sugi Umetarō, Fumi's eldest brother
- Yūka as Odamura Hisa, Fumi's second eldest sister, Odamura's first wife
  - Kanon as young Hisa
- Yūki Morinaga as Sugi Toshisaburō, Fumi's younger brother

=== Odamura family ===
- Takao Osawa as Odamura Inosuke (later Katori Motohiko), Fumi's second husband
- Rino Katase as Odamura Shino, Inosuke's mother
- Kanji Tsuda as Matsushima Gōzō, Inosuke's elder brother

=== Students of Shoka Sonjuku ===
- Kengo Kora as Takasugi Shinsaku
- Masahiro Higashide as Kusaka Genzui, Fumi's first husband
- Kōji Seto as Yoshida Toshimaro
- Hitori Gekidan as Itō Risuke (later Ito Hirobumi), the first prime minister of Japan
- Ryūta Satō as Maebara Issei, leader of Hagi Rebellion
- Jun Kaname as Irie Kuichi
- Takurō Ōno as Nomura Yasushi

=== Chōshū Domain ===
- Kin'ya Kitaōji as Mōri Takachika, the 13th daimyō of Chōshū
- Takahiro Miura as Mōri Motonori, the last daimyō of Chōshū
- Keiko Matsuzaka as Mōri Tomiko
- Rena Tanaka as Mōri Yasuko
- Takashi Naitō as Mukunashi Tōta
- Mayumi Wakamura as Mukunashi Mitsuru
- Noriyuki Higashiyama as Kido Takayoshi, one of the Three great nobles
- Kanji Ishimaru as Sufu Masanosuke
- Shinji Yamashita as Kijima Matabei
- Masanori Ishii as Inoue Kaoru
- Tasuku Nagaoka as Yamagata Aritomo
- Yūto Ichioka as Ōmura Masujirō
- Mizuki Itagaki as Mōri Motoakira

=== Okugoten ===
Okugoten is the harem (oku) of Chōshū Domain.

- Kayoko Shiraishi as Kunishima
- Guin Poon Chaw as Sonoyama, director of Okugoten
- Anna Ishibashi as Mari
- Machiko Washio as Ushio
- Noriko Eguchi as Hinode
- Yumiko Takahashi as Shino
- Rina Ikoma (Nogizaka46)
- Nanase Nishino (Nogizaka46)
- Mai Shiraishi (Nogizaka46)
- Nanami Hashimoto (Nogizaka46)
- Erika Ikuta (Nogizaka46)
- Kazumi Takayama (Nogizaka46)
- Yumi Wakatsuki (Nogizaka46)
- Reika Sakurai (Nogizaka46)
- Mai Fukagawa (Nogizaka46)
- Manatsu Akimoto (Nogizaka46)

=== Satsuma Domain ===
- Takayuki Takuma as Saigō Takamori, one of the Three great nobles
- Naoto Eguchi (Dobu Rock) as Shimazu Hisamitsu

=== Tosa Domain ===
- Tsuyoshi Ihara as Sakamoto Ryōma

=== Tokugawa shogunate ===
- Shintarō Mori (Dobu Rock) as Tokugawa Yoshinobu
- Hideki Takahashi as Ii Naosuke
- Ryuichi Isozaki as Matsudaira Shungaku

=== Shinsengumi ===
- Masaya Nakamura as Kondō Isami
- Kento Kaku as Okita Sōji

=== Aizu Domain ===
- Takehiko Fujita as Matsudaira Katamori

=== Foreigners ===
- Lee Longshaw as Townsend Harris
- Mark Chinnery as Samuel Wells Williams
- John Ohkuma as Thomas Blake Glover

=== Others ===
- Haruka Igawa as Takasu Hisako
- Umika Kawashima as Takasu Ito
- Hirotarō Honda as Tominaga Yūrin
- Kento Miyahara as a sumo wrestler
- Anne Suzuki as Tatsuji
- Mitsuru Hirata as Dr. Yamane Bunki
- Yuina Kuroshima as Takasugi Masa, Shinsaku's wife
- George Yamamoto as Shiraishi Shōichirō
- Akiko Hinagata as Ikumatsu, Takayoshi's wife
- Tōru Emori as Akuzawa Gonzō, official of Gunma prefecture
- Yoshiko Mita as Akuzawa Sei
- Shunsuke Daito as Hoshino Chōtarō
- Yoshihiko Hosoda as Arai Ryōichirō
- Kazuyuki Aijima as Suzuki Eitarō
- Hiroyuki Onoue as Kudō Chōjirō
- Masako Miyaji as Tome
- Yoshizumi Ishihara as Funatsu Denjibei, one of "Three agricultural professionals of Meiji"
- Takamasa Suga as Murakami Tsunehisa
- Kurara Chibana as Tsuda Umeko
- Kisuke Iida as Saigō Jūdō
- Eri Fuse as Mrs. Sagano
- Atsuko Sakurai as Mrs. Iketani
- Fumina Hara as Mrs. Sakata
- Karen Miyazaki as Irie Sumi
- Fujiko Kojima as Yoshida Fusa
- Anna Yamada as Hisa's friend

== Production ==
- Music – Kenji Kawai
- Titling – Tomomi Kunishige
- Historical research – Manabu Ōishi, Tōru Umihara, Tsugunobu Miyake
- Sword fight arranger - Kunishirō Hayashi
- Architectural research – Kiyoshi Hirai
- Clothing research – Kiyoko Koizumi
- Narrator – Shūichi Ikeda
- PR character – Moyurun (voiced by Haruka Tomatsu)

== See also ==
- Bakumatsu
- Meiji Restoration
