= Photograph of Memories =

2021 Japanese film

- Japanese: おもいで写眞
- Directed by: Kumazawa Naoto
- Written by: Kumazawa Naoto: Manabe Yukiko
- Starring: Fukagawa Mai: Kengo Kora; Karina; Arata Iura; Furuya Ikkou; Kazuko Yoshiyuki
- Cinematography: Tsukinaga Yuuta
- Music by: Yasukawa Gorou
- Production company: Studio Blue
- Distributed by: Aeon Entertainment
- Release date: January 29, 2021
- Running time: 110 minutes
- Country: Japan
- Language: Japanese

Omoide Shashin (おもいで写眞) or Photograph of Memories is a 2021 Japanese movie, directed by Kumazawa Naoto and starring Fukagawa Mai and Kengo Kora. The theme song was performed by Rei Yasuda.

== Plot summary ==
Fukagawa plays a girl who returns to her rural hometown in Toyama after failing to make a career in Tokyo. When her grandmother dies and her funeral photo is blurry, she works with her friend in local government (Kora) to take high quality photos of senior citizens. One elderly woman (Yoshiyuki) initially refuses, believing the act of taking a funeral photo to be bad luck, but agrees after Fukagawa offers to take her picture in some place with special significance to her. They rebrand the service as "photographs of memories" and start taking more local seniors on trips to be photographed.

== Cast ==
- Fukagawa Mai as Otosara Yuuko
- Kengo Kora as Hoshino Ichirou
- Karina as Kashii Misaki
- Furuya Ikkou as Kawashiba Masatoshi
- Kazuko Yoshiyuki as Yamagishi Kazuko
