= Hatsumori Bemars =

- Genre: Drama
- Written by: Hiroyuki Komine; Nonji Nemoto
- Directed by: Nobuhiro Suzumura; Kenichirō Nishiumi; Takashi Motoki
- Starring: Nogizaka46
- Opening theme: "Taiyō Nokku" by Nogizaka46
- Country of origin: Japan
- Original language: Japanese
- No. of episodes: 12

Production
- Producers: Kōichi Hamatani; Toshiki Komatsu
- Running time: 40 minutes

Original release
- Network: TV Tokyo
- Release: 11 July – 26 September 2015

Hatsumori Bemars (初森ベマーズ) is a Japanese television drama series starring Japanese idol girl group Nogizaka46. Nanase Nishino played the lead role. It premiered on TV Tokyo on 11 July 2015. The theme song is "Taiyō Nokku".

== Cast ==
- Nanase Nishino as Nanamaru
- Mai Shiraishi as Kirei
- Reika Sakurai as Bunan
- Nanami Hashimoto as Marukyū
- Erika Ikuta as Chopin
- Kazumi Takayama as Kote
- Rina Ikoma as Academy
- Yumi Wakatsuki as Imadoki
- Manatsu Akimoto as Harvard
- Mai Fukagawa as Kāchan
- Sayuri Matsumura as Yūutsu
- Misa Etō as Shelly
- Tezuka Tōru as Kamata
- Kanji Tsuda as Gondawara

Preceded by Fubenna Benriya (11 April 2015 - 27 June 2015)	TV Tokyo Drama 24; Saturdays 00:12 - 00:52 (JST)	Succeeded by Kodoku no Gourmet season 5 (3 October 2015 -)
