= Seifuku no Mannequin =

2012 single by Nogizaka46

- Regular edition cover

Single by Nogizaka46

from the album Tōmei na Iro
- B-side: "Yubi Bōenkyō"; "Yasashisa Nara Ma ni Atteru" (Type-A); "Koko Ja Nai Dokoka" (Type-B); "Haru no Melody" (Type-C); "Shibuya Blues" (Regular)
- Released: December 19, 2012
- Genre: J-pop
- Label: N46Div.
- Producer: Yasushi Akimoto

Nogizaka46 singles chronology
"Hashire! Bicycle" (2012)	"Seifuku no Mannequin" (2012)	"Kimi no Na wa Kibō" (2013)

"Seifuku no Mannequin" (Japanese: 制服のマネキン, Hepburn: Seifuku no Manekin; "Uniform mannequin") is the fourth single by Nogizaka46, released on December 19, 2012. It debuted in number one on the weekly Oricon Singles Chart. It also reached number one on the Billboard Japan Hot 100. The music video was directed by Kazuma Ikeda. He later directed the music video for Keyakizaka46 debut song Silent Majority.

== Release ==
This single was released in 5 versions. Type-A, Type-B, Type-C, a regular and anime edition. The first three editions are CD+DVD. The B-side track, "Yubi Bōenkyō", was used as the ending to the anime Magi: The Labyrinth of Magic.

The center position in the choreography for the title song is held by Rina Ikoma.

== Track listing ==
=== Type-A ===
CD
No.	Title	Length
1.	"Seifuku no Mannequin" (制服のマネキン)	4:23
2.	"Yubi Bōenkyō" (指望遠鏡)	3:22
3.	"Yasashisa Nara Ma ni Atteru" (やさしさなら間に合ってる)	4:32
4.	"Seifuku no Mannequin off vocal ver." (制服のマネキン off vocal ver.)	4:23
5.	"Yubi Bōenkyō off vocal ver." (指望遠鏡 off vocal ver.)	3:21
6.	"Yasashisa Nara Ma ni Atteru off vocal ver." (やさしさなら間に合ってる off vocal ver.)	4:31

DVD
No.	Title	Length
1.	"Seifuku no Mannequin Music Video"
2.	"Yubi Bōenkyō Music Video"
3.	"Mikumo Andō"
4.	"Rina Ikoma"
5.	"Nene Itō"
6.	"Sayuri Itō"
7.	"Hina Kawago"
8.	"Chiharu Saitō"
9.	"Mai Shiraishi"
10.	"Seira Nagashima"
11.	"Mai Fukagawa"
12.	"Rina Yamato"
13.	"Yumi Wakatsuki"

=== Type-B ===
CD
No.	Title	Length
1.	"Seifuku no Mannequin" (制服のマネキン)	4:23
2.	"Yubi Bōenkyō" (指望遠鏡)	3:22
3.	"Koko Ja Nai Dokoka" (ここじゃないどこか)	3:37
4.	"Seifuku no Mannequin off vocal ver." (制服のマネキン off vocal ver.)	4:23
5.	"Yubi Bōenkyō off vocal ver." (指望遠鏡 off vocal ver.)	3:21
6.	"Koko Ja Nai Dokoka off vocal ver." (ここじゃないどこか off vocal ver.)	3:36

DVD
No.	Title	Length
1.	"Seifuku no Mannequin Music Video"
2.	"Koko Ja Nai Dokoka Music Video"
3.	"Manatsu Akimoto"
4.	"Marika Itō"
5.	"Misa Etō"
6.	"Mahiro Kawamura"
7.	"Kana Nakada"
8.	"Himeka Nakamoto"
9.	"Nanase Nishino"
10.	"Seira Hatanaka"
11.	"Sayuri Matsumura"
12.	"Seira Miyazawa"

=== Type-C ===
CD
No.	Title	Length
1.	"Seifuku no Mannequin" (制服のマネキン)	4:23
2.	"Yubi Bōenkyō" (指望遠鏡)	3:22
3.	"Haru no Melody" (春のメロディー)	4:47
4.	"Seifuku no Mannequin off vocal ver." (制服のマネキン off vocal ver.)	4:23
5.	"Yubi Bōenkyō off vocal ver." (指望遠鏡 off vocal ver.)	3:21
6.	"Haru no Melody off vocal ver." (春のメロディー off vocal ver.)	4:46

DVD
No.	Title	Length
1.	"Seifuku no Mannequin Music Video"
2.	"Haru no Melody Music Video"
3.	"Erika Ikuta"
4.	"Rena Ichiki"
5.	"Asuka Saitō"
6.	"Yūri Saitō"
7.	"Reika Sakurai"
8.	"Kazumi Takayama"
9.	"Ami Nōjō"
10.	"Nanami Hashimoto"
11.	"Hina Higuchi"
12.	"Minami Hoshino"
13.	"Maaya Wada"

=== Regular Edition ===
CD
No.	Title	Lyrics	Music	Artist(s)	Length
1.	"Seifuku no Mannequin" (制服のマネキン)	Yasushi Akimoto	Katsuhiko Sugiyama	Rina Ikoma, et cetera	4:23
2.	"Yubi Bōenkyō" (指望遠鏡)	Yasushi Akimoto	Ryoma Kitamuro	Rina Ikoma, et cetera	3:22
3.	"Shibuya Blues" (渋谷ブルース)	Yasushi Akimoto	Yoshinori Satoh	Kazumi Takayama, Mai Shiraishi	4:50
4.	"Seifuku no Mannequin off vocal ver." (制服のマネキン off vocal ver.)		Katsuhiko Sugiyama		4:23
5.	"Yubi Bōenkyō off vocal ver." (指望遠鏡 off vocal ver.)		Ryoma Kitamuro		3:21
6.	"Shibuya Blues off vocal ver." (渋谷ブルース off vocal ver.)		Yoshinori Satoh		4:48

=== Anime Edition ===
CD
No.	Title	Length
1.	"Seifuku no Mannequin" (制服のマネキン)	4:23
2.	"Yubi Bōenkyō" (指望遠鏡)	3:22
3.	"Yubi Bōenkyō: Anime Version" (指望遠鏡 ～アニメ版～)
4.	"Seifuku no Mannequin off vocal ver." (制服のマネキン off vocal ver.)	4:23
5.	"Yubi Bōenkyō off vocal ver." (指望遠鏡 off vocal ver.)	3:21

== Chart and certifications ==
=== Oricon Charts ===
Release	Oricon Singles Chart	Peak position	Debut sales (copies)	Sales total (copies)
December 19, 2012	Daily Chart	1	190,108	276,155
December 19, 2012	Weekly Chart	1	232,961	276,155
December 19, 2012	Monthly Chart	2	253,510	276,155
December 19, 2012	Yearly Chart(2013)	21	306,430	276,155

=== Certifications ===
Region	Certification	Certified units/sales
Japan (RIAJ) Physical single	Platinum	250,000^{^}
Japan (RIAJ) Digital single	Gold	100,000^{*}
^{*} Sales figures based on certification alone.^{^} Shipments figures based on certification alone.
