= Reika Sakurai =

Japanese actress (born 1994)

- 桜井 玲香
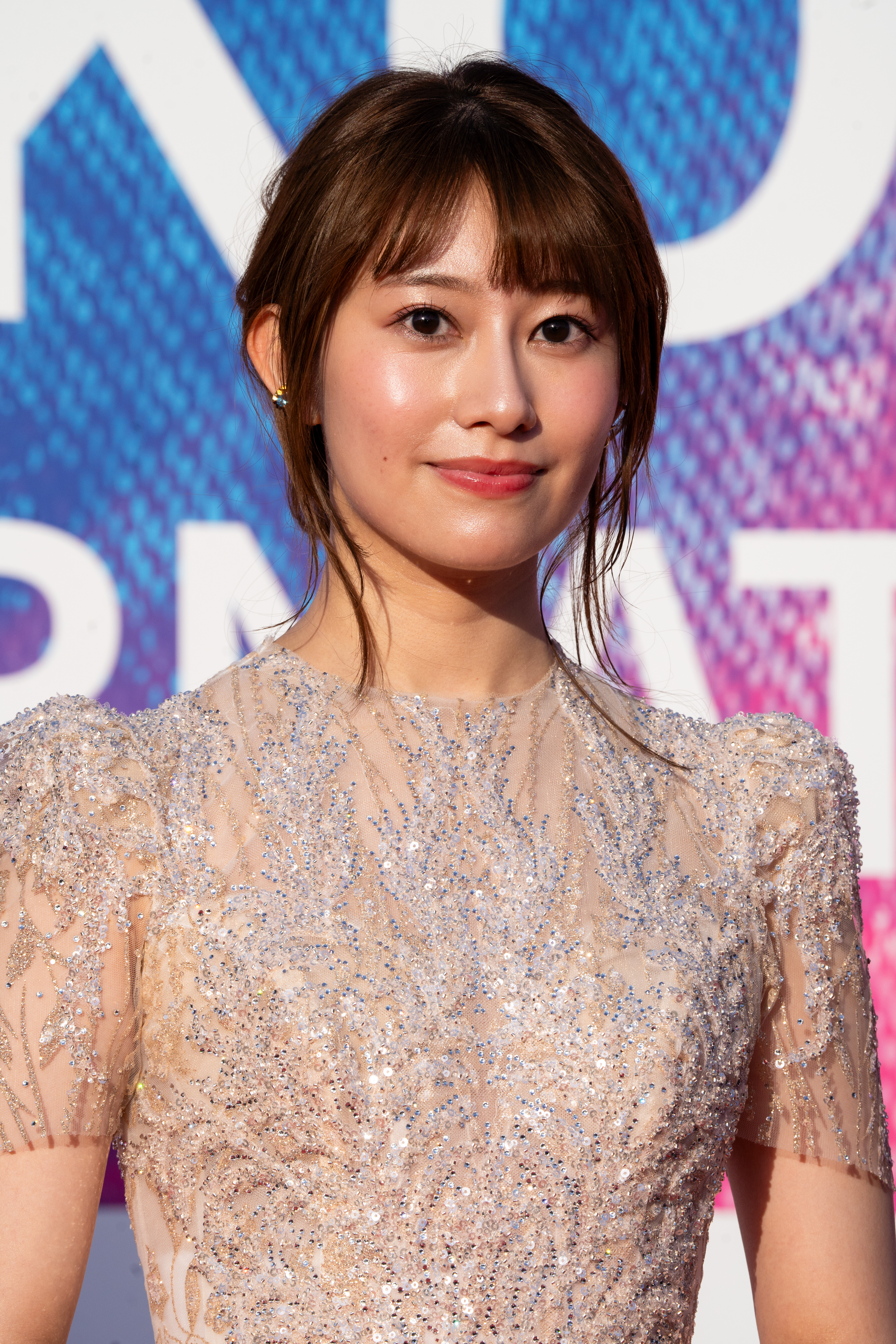
- Sakurai at the Yokohama Film Festival in 2024
- Born: 16 May 1994 (age 32); Hakodate, Hokkaido, Japan
- Other name: Cap (キャップ)
- Occupations: Actress
- Hometown: Yokohama, Kanagawa Prefecture
- Years active: 2011–present
- Musical career
- Genres: J-pop
- Instrument: Vocals
- Years active: 2011–2019
- Label: Sony Records/N46Div
- Formerly of: Nogizaka46

Reika Sakurai (桜井 玲香, Sakurai Reika; born May 16, 1994) is a Japanese actress. She was a first generation member of the idol girl group Nogizaka46. She was also the captain of the group before her departure.

== Biography ==
Sakurai was born in her mother's hometown of Hakodate, Hokkaido, on May 16, 1994. Sometime later, her parents relocated and she was raised in Kanagawa Prefecture's, Yokohama City.

== Career ==
In 2011, Sakurai auditioned for Nogizaka46 and was chosen as one of the first generation members. Her audition song was Happiness's "Kiss Me". She was chosen as one of the members performing on their debut single "Guruguru Curtain", released on February 22, 2012. She took the front position for Nogizaka46's second single "Oide Shampoo", released on May 2, 2012. In June 2012, she was appointed the captain of Nogizaka46. After graduating from high school, she studied sociology at college. In April 2013, she regularly appeared on the television drama Bad Boys J with other Nogizaka46 members.

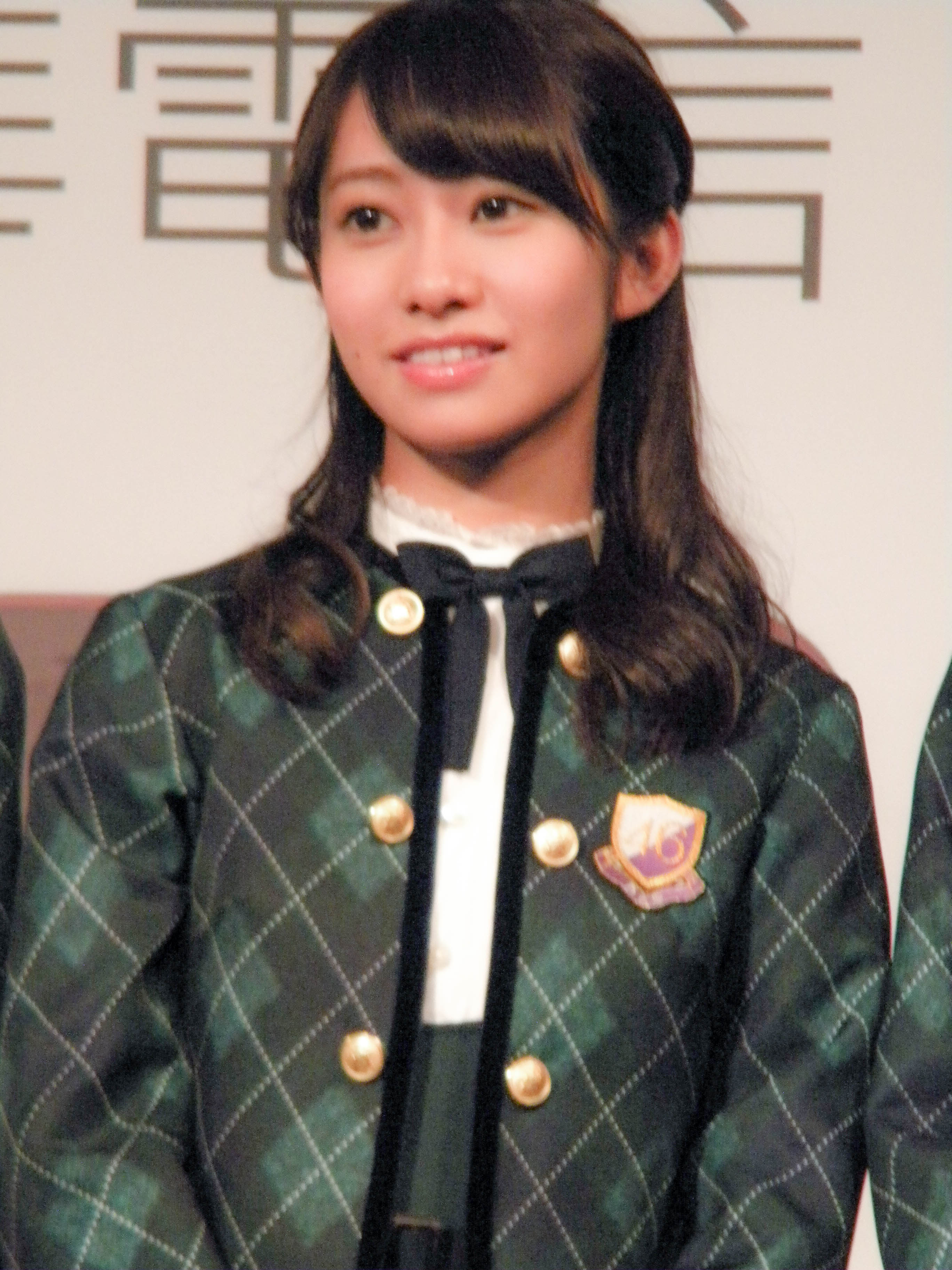
Sakurai with Nogizaka46 in Taipei, Taiwan in 2014

From October 25 to November 9, 2014, she played the heroine in the musical Mr. Kaminari, alongside former Nogizaka46 bandmate Misa Etō. In 2016, she was cast as the leading role in Kiraware Matsuko no Isshō, a stage adaptation of the film Memories of Matsuko. Former Nogizaka46 bandmate Yumi Wakatsuki also played the same role. In February 2017, she shot herself to promote her photo book titled Jiyu to Iu Koto which was released on March 8, 2017.

On July 8, 2019, Sakurai announced that she would be graduating from Nogizaka46 on September 1, 2019, timing her graduation to coincide with the final stop of the group's national summer tour.

On March 1, 2021, she has opened an official web site and fan club.

== Discography ==
=== Singles with Nogizaka46 ===
Year	No.	Title	Role	Notes
2012	1	"Guruguru Curtain"	A-side	Debut as 1st Generation member; Also sang on "Nogizaka no Uta", "Aitakatta Kamoshirenai", "Ushinaitakunai kara" and "Shiroi Kumo ni Notte"
2012	2	"Oide Shampoo"	A-side	Also sang on "Kokoro no Kusuri" and "House!"
2012	3	"Hashire! Bicycle"	A-side	Also sang on "Hito wa Naze Hashiru no ka" and "Oto ga Denai Guitar"
2012	4	"Seifuku no Mannequin"	A-side	Also sang on "Yubi Bōenkyō"
2013	5	"Kimi no Na wa Kibō"	A-side	Also sang on "Shakiism", "Romantic Ikayaki" and "Psychokinesis no Kanosei"
2013	6	"Girl's Rule"	A-side	Also sang on "Sekai de Ichiban Kodoku na Lover", "Hoka no Hoshi Kara" and "Ningen to Iu Gakki"
2013	7	"Barrette"	A-side	Also sang on "Tsuki no Ōkisa", "Watashi no Tame ni, Dareka no Tame ni" and "Sonna Baka na…"
2014	8	"Kizuitara Kataomoi"	A-side	Also sang on "Romance no Start", "Toiki no Method" and "Dankeschön"
2014	9	"Natsu no Free & Easy"	A-side	Also sang on "Nani mo Dekizu ni Soba ni Iru", "Mukuchi na Lion" and "Boku ga Ikanakya Dare ga Ikunda?"
2014	10	"Nandome no Aozora ka?"	A-side	Also sang on "Tōmawari no Aijō", "Korogatta Kane o Narase!" and "Tender Days"
2015	11	"Inochi wa Utsukushii"	A-side	
2015	12	"Taiyō Nokku"	A-side	Also sang on "Hane no Kioku"
2015	13	"Ima, Hanashitai Dareka ga Iru"	A-side	Also sang on "Popipappapā", "Kanashimi no Wasurekata" and "Sukima"
2016	14	"Harujion ga Sakukoro"	A-side	Also sang on "Yūutsu to Fūsen Gum"
2016	15	"Hadashi de Summer"	A-side	Also sang on "Boku Dake no Hikari"
2016	16	"Sayonara no Imi"	A-side	Also sang on "Kodoku na Aozora"
2017	17	"Influencer"	A-side	Also sang on "Jinsei o Kangaetakunaru"
2017	18	"Nigemizu"	A-side	Also sang on "Onna wa Hitori ja Nemurenai", "Hito Natsu no Nagasa Yori…" and "Naitatte Iijanaika?"
2017	19	"Itsuka Dekiru kara Kyō Dekiru"	A-side	Also sang on "Fuminshō"
2018	20	"Synchronicity"	A-side	Also sang on "Against" as 1st Generation member and "Kumo ni Nareba ii"
2018	21	"Jikochū de Ikō!"	A-side	Also sang on "Anna ni Sukidatta no ni…"
2018	22	"Kaerimichi wa Tōmawari Shitaku Naru"	A-side	Also sang on "Kokuhaku no Junban"
2019	23	"Sing Out!"	A-side	
2019	24	"Yoake Made Tsuyogaranakutemoii"	A-side	Last single to participate; also sang on "Boku no Koto, Shitteru?", "Boku no Omoikomi" and "Tokidoki Omoidashite Kudasai" which was her graduation song.
2020	—	"Sekaijū no Rinjin yo"	—	Charity song during the COVID-19 pandemic

=== Albums with Nogizaka46 ===
Year	No.	Title	Participated song
2015	1	Tōmei na Iro	"Boku ga Iru Basho"; "Dareka wa Mikata"
2016	2	Sorezore no Isu	"Kikkake"; "Taiyō ni Kudokarete"; "Kuchiyakusoku"
2017	3	Umarete Kara Hajimete Mita Yume	"Skydiving"; "Settei Ondo"; "Rewind Ano Hi"
2019	4	Ima ga Omoide ni Naru made	"Arigachi na Ren'ai"; "Pocchito"

=== Other featured songs ===
Year	Artist	Title	Albums / Singles
2012	Mayu Watanabe	"Twin Tail wa Mō Shinai"	"Otona Jellybeans"
2016	AKB48	"Mazariau Mono"	"Kimi wa Melody"

== Filmography ==
=== Television ===
Year	Title	Role	Channel	Notes	Ref(s)
2013	Bad Boys J	Mariya Miyashita	NTV		
2013	Umi no Ue no Shinryōsho		Fuji TV	One episode	
2015	Tenshi no Knife	Cafe worker/Ayumi Nishina	Wowow		
2015	Hatsumori Bemars	Bunan	TV Tokyo		
2015	Hana Moyu		NHK	Taiga drama	
2024-2025	Bakuage Sentai Boonboomger	Maimi Baisu	TV Asahi		

=== Films ===
Year	Title	Role	Ref(s)
2013	Bad Boys J: Saigo ni Mamoru Mono	Mariya Miyashita	
2017	Asahinagu	Shōko Yasomura	
2021	Shinonome-iro no Shūmatsu	Mirei Ōtsuki	
2025	Requiem	Sae Mukai	

=== Theater ===
Year	Title	Role	Venue	Ref(s)
2014	Mr. Kaminari	Doremi Usuki	Sunshine Theatre	
2015	Subete no Inu wa Tengoku e Iku		AiiA 2.5 Theater Tokyo	
2015	Princess Knight	Hecate	Akasaka ACT Theater	
2016	Joshiraku 2: Toki Kakesoba	Tetora Bōhatei	AiiA 2.5 Theater Tokyo	
2016	Kiraware Matsuko no Isshō	Matsuko Kawajiri	Shinagawa Prince Hotel	
2018-2019	Rebecca	I		
2019	The Bank Robbery			
2019	Dance of the Vampires	Sarah		
2020	Flashdance	Gloria		
2020	West Side Story	Maria		
2021	Ghost	Molly Jensen		
2022	Flower Drum Song	Mei Li		
2022	DOROTHY ~The Wizard of Oz~	Dorothy Gale		
2023	First Date	Casey		
2023	Jekyll & Hyde	Emma Carew		
2024	In This Corner of the World	Rin Shiraki		
2025	Bonnie and Clyde	Bonnie Parker		

== Bibliography ==
=== Photobooks ===
- Kikan Nogizaka vol.1 Sōshun (5 March 2014, Tokyo News Service) ISBN 9784863363878
- Jiyuu to Iu Koto (6 March 2017, Kobunsha) ISBN 9784334902193
- Shisen (27 November 2019, Kobunsha) ISBN 9784334902469
