= Kana Nakada =

Japanese mahjong player, model, and author

- 中田 花奈
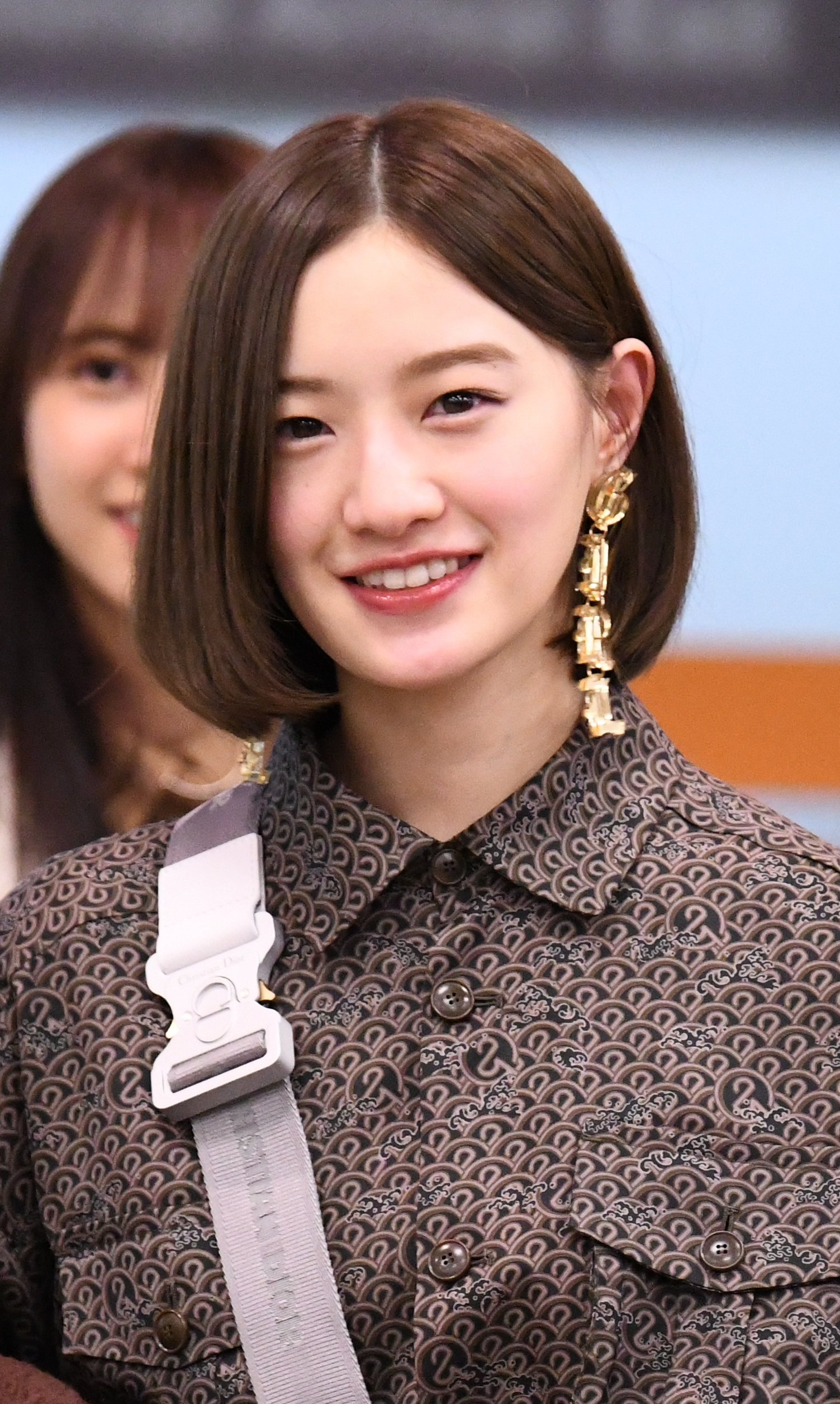
- Kana Nakada in 2020
- Born: August 6, 1994 (age 32); Saitama Prefecture, Japan
- Occupations: Professional mahjong player; television personality; entrepreneur; gravure idol; author
- Years active: 2011–present
- Agent: Nogizaka46, LLC
- Sports career
- Years active: 2023–present
- Sport: Japanese mahjong
- League: M.League
- Team: Beast X
- Turned pro: 2023

Sports achievements and titles
- Highest world ranking: Best 16 (4th World Riichi Championship, 2025)
- Musical career
- Years active: 2011–2020
- Label: Sony
- Formerly of: Nogizaka46
- Website: Official website

Kana Nakada (Japanese: 中田 花奈, Hepburn: Nakada Kana; born August 6, 1994) is a Japanese professional mahjong player, television personality, entrepreneur, gravure idol, and author. She is a member of the Beast X (read as "Beast Ten") mahjong team and a former founding member of the girl group Nogizaka46.

== Career ==
Nakada passed the first-generation auditions for Nogizaka46 in August 2011, beginning her career as a founding member of the group. Over her nine-year tenure as an idol, she served as the center (lead performer) for B-side tracks such as "Haru no Melody" (2012) and "Sankaku no Akichi" (2018). During live performances of the group's second single "Oide Shampoo", the fan-made chant "Nakada Kana shika" (ナカダカナシカ; transl. "Only Kana Nakada") became popular among fans. She also co-starred in the group's 2018 stage production of Sailor Moon as Sailor Venus.

In July 2020, Nakada announced that she would leave Nogizaka46 "by the end of the year". Prior to her departure, she performed as the center for "Oide Shampoo" in the TV Tokyo Music Festival 2020 Autumn. Her first photobook, titled Suki na Koto dake o Shiteitai (好きなことだけをしていたい; lit. 'I Just Want to Do the Things I Love'), was published by Kobunsha on October 13. Shot in Tokyo and Chiba Prefectures, it showcases her various interests, including Japanese hip-hop culture. It sold 32,000 copies in its opening week, placing it first on the Oricon weekly book ranking. She officially left the group on October 25. On December 5, she made her authorial debut with a business book exploring Warren Buffett's investment strategies, co-authored with Nihon University professor Akira Hamamoto.

Nakada developed an interest in Japanese mahjong during her idol years and passed the Japan Professional Mahjong League exam in March 2021, launching her career as a professional mahjong player. She also opened and currently manages her own mahjong café, Chun (中). On June 30, 2023, Nakada was drafted by the newly formed M.League team Beast Japanext, later renamed Beast X (read as "Beast Ten", after the team owner, the BS10 satellite television channel), to compete in the 2023–24 season.

During her rookie season, Nakada struggled to secure high placements against veteran players, finishing the regular season at the bottom of the individual standings with a score of −261.3 points and only one first-place finish in 14 games. Her sophomore season (2024–25) also proved challenging, ending with a score of −575.4 points. However, Nakada experienced a breakout in the 2025–26 season as she won 9 out of 27 games and secured a top-10 individual ranking with a positive score of +228.4 points by March 2026. During this season, she also achieved a massive 65,100-point game, breaking the team's record for the highest match score.

Outside of M.League, Nakada reached the Best 16 of the 4th World Riichi Championship. She also performed the opening theme song of the 2023 mahjong anime Pon no Michi, titled "Ponpopopon" and featuring the anime voice actors billed as the "Pon no Michi All Stars".

Nakada continued her authorial pursuits by publishing an introductory guide to mahjong and a photo essay in 2025. She also released her second photobook, titled Kakitateru (掻き立てる; lit. 'Stir Up') and published by Kodansha on May 27. Shot in Jeju Island and Seoul, South Korea, it has been described as a more "mature" and "passionate" work, with poses and expressions inspired by contemporary dance moves.

== Discography ==
Nakada's prominent appearances in Nogizaka46's music releases include:

- "Haru no Melody" ("Seifuku no Mannequin" B-side, 2012), center
- "Sekkachina Katatsumuri" ("Hashire! Bicycle" B-side, 2012), unit song with 7 members
- "Hoka no Hoshi kara" ("Girl's Rule" B-side, 2013), unit song with 7 members
- "Sankaku no Akichi" ("Jikochū de Ikō!" B-side, 2018), center
- "Kokuhaku no Junban" ("Kaerimichi wa Tōmawari Shitaku Naru" B-side, 2018), unit song as "Joshi Kō Quartet" with Manatsu Akimoto, Reika Sakurai, and Yumi Wakatsuki

=== Collaboration ===
Music video
- "Ponpopopon" on YouTube

- "Ponpopopon" (2023), Pon no Michi anime opening song, featuring the Pon no Michi All Stars

== Filmography ==
=== Variety show ===
- Cunning Takeyama no Ichiban Kenkyūjo (Tokyo MX), regular co-host ("researcher"), 2021–present

=== Anime series ===
- Pon no Michi, Maid (episode 7), 2024

== Bibliography ==
=== Books ===
- The Story of How My Life Changed After Learning Buffett's Investing Methods (「バフェットの投資術」を学んだら、生き方まで変わった話。, Buffett no Tōshijutsu" o Manandara, Ikikata made Kawatta Hanashi.), co-authored with Akira Hamamoto, PHP Institute, ISBN 978-4569848419, 2020
- Even Beginners Will Understand Instantly! Kana Nakada's Introduction to Mahjong (初めてでもすぐ、よくわかる！ 中田花奈の麻雀入門, Hajimete demo Sugu, Yoku Wakaru! Nakada Kana no Mājan Nyūmon), Wani Books, ISBN 978-4847074875, 2025
- Nakada Kana 1st Photo Essay Kaiseki Memorial (中田花奈 1st フォトエッセイ 解析メモリアル), Kadokawa, ISBN 978-4048978248, 2025

=== Photobooks ===
- Suki na Koto dake o Shiteitai (好きなことだけをしていたい; lit. 'I Just Want to Do the Things I Love'), Kobunsha, ISBN 978-4334902612, 2020
- Hana Hokorobu (花ほころぶ), digital photobook, Kobunsha, 2020
- Kakitateru (掻き立てる; lit. 'Stir Up'), Kodansha, ISBN 978-4065398012, 2025

== Theater ==
- Nogizaka46 Musical Sailor Moon, Sailor Venus (double cast with Hina HIguchi), 2018
