= Tōmei na Iro =

- Regular edition cover

Studio album by Nogizaka46
- Released: January 7, 2015 (Japan)
- Genre: J-pop
- Label: N46Div.
- Producer: Yasushi Akimoto

Nogizaka46 chronology
Tōmei na Iro (2015)	Sorezore no Isu (2016)

Singles from Tōmei na Iro
- 1. "Guruguru Curtain" Released: February 22, 2012; 2. "Oide Shampoo" Released: May 2, 2012; 3. "Hashire! Bicycle" Released: August 22, 2012; 4. "Seifuku no Mannequin" Released: December 19, 2012; 5. "Kimi no Na wa Kibō" Released: March 13, 2013; 6. "Girl's Rule" Released: July 3, 2013; 7. "Barrette" Released: November 27, 2013; 8. "Kizuitara Kataomoi" Released: April 2, 2014; 9. "Natsu no Free & Easy" Released: July 9, 2014; 10. "Nandome no Aozora ka?" Released: October 8, 2014

Tōmei na Iro (Japanese: 透明な色; "Transparent color") is the debut album of Japanese idol girl group Nogizaka46. It was released on January 7, 2015. It reached the number-one place on the weekly Oricon Albums Chart, with 222,000 copies. It also reached the number-one place on the Billboard Japan Hot 100. In January 2015, the album was certified Platinum by the Recording Industry Association of Japan.

== Release ==
It was released in 3 editions, Type-A, Type-B and Type-C. Type-A includes two audio CDs and a DVD with 60 minutes live music video Nogizaka46 Summer National Tour 2013 Final! at Yoyogi National 1st Gymnasium. Type-B contains two audio CDs. Type-C has just one CD that includes the title song from 1st to 10th single and four new songs. The album cover photo was taken at Tokyo Metro Nogizaka Station.

== Track listing ==
Disc1 (Type A, Type B, Type C)
No.	Title	Length
1.	"Overture"	1:16
2.	"Guruguru Curtain" (ぐるぐるカーテン)	4:04
3.	"Oide Shampoo" (おいでシャンプー)	4:08
4.	"Hashire! Bicycle" (走れ!Bicycle)	3:40
5.	"Seifuku no Mannequin" (制服のマネキン)	4:21
6.	"Kimi no Na wa Kibō" (君の名は希望)	5:25
7.	"Girls' Rule" (ガールズルール)	4:50
8.	"Barrette" (バレッタ)	4:19
9.	"Kizuitara Kataomoi" (気づいたら片想い)	4:14
10.	"Natsu no Free & Easy" (夏のFree&Easy)	5:02
11.	"Nandome no Aozora ka?" (何度目の青空か?)	4:49
12.	"Dareka wa Mikata" (誰かは味方)	4:58
13.	"Kakumei no Uma" (革命の馬)	4:13
14.	"Boku ga Iru Basho" (僕がいる場所)	5:03
15.	"Anata no Tame ni Hikitai" (あなたのために弾きたい)	3:45

Disk2 (Type A, Type B)
No.	Title	Notes	Length
1.	"Hoka no Hoshi Kara" (他の星から)		4:09
2.	"Watashi no Tame ni Dareka no Tame ni" (私のために 誰かのために)		5:14
3.	"Sekkachi na Katatsumuri" (せっかちなかたつむり)		5:05
4.	"Namida ga Mada Kanashimi Datta Koro" (涙がまだ悲しみだった頃)		4:19
5.	"Mukuchi na Lion" (無口なライオン)		4:24
6.	"Sekai de Ichiban Kodoku na Lover" (世界で一番 孤独なLover)		3:44
7.	"Anohi Boku wa Tossa ni Uso o Tsuita" (あの日 僕は咄嗟に嘘をついた)		4:13
8.	"13-nichi no Kinyōbi" (13日の金曜日)		3:42
9.	"Ushinaitakunai Kara" (失いたくないから)		4:16
10.	"Danke Schön" (ダンケシェーン)		3:42
11.	"Keisha Suru" (傾斜する)	Kojizaka46(Haruna Kojima with Nogizaka46's 15 members)	4:36
12.	"Nazo no Rakugaki" (なぞの落書き)	Sung by Minami Hoshino, Miona Hori and Asuka Saitō	4:30
13.	"Jiyū no Kanata" (自由の彼方)	Sung by 10th single under members and Kenkyūsei	5:01
14.	"Hitoriyogari" (ひとりよがり)	Sung by Nanase Nishino	5:19

DVD (Type A)
No.	Title	Length
1.	"Manatsu no Zenkoku Tour 2013 Final!" (真夏の全国ツアー2013 Final!)

== Charts ==
=== Weekly ===
Chart (2015)	Peak position
Japan (Oricon Weekly Albums Chart)	1
Japan (Billboard Japan Hot 100)	1
TWN Five Music J/K-pop Chart	4

=== Year-end charts ===
Chart (2015)	Peak position
Japan (Oricon Yearly Albums Chart)	11

=== Certifications ===
Certification	Sales (copies)
RIAJ physical shipping certification	Platinum
