= Kazumi Takayama =

Japanese novelist and television presenter (born 1994)

- 高山 一実
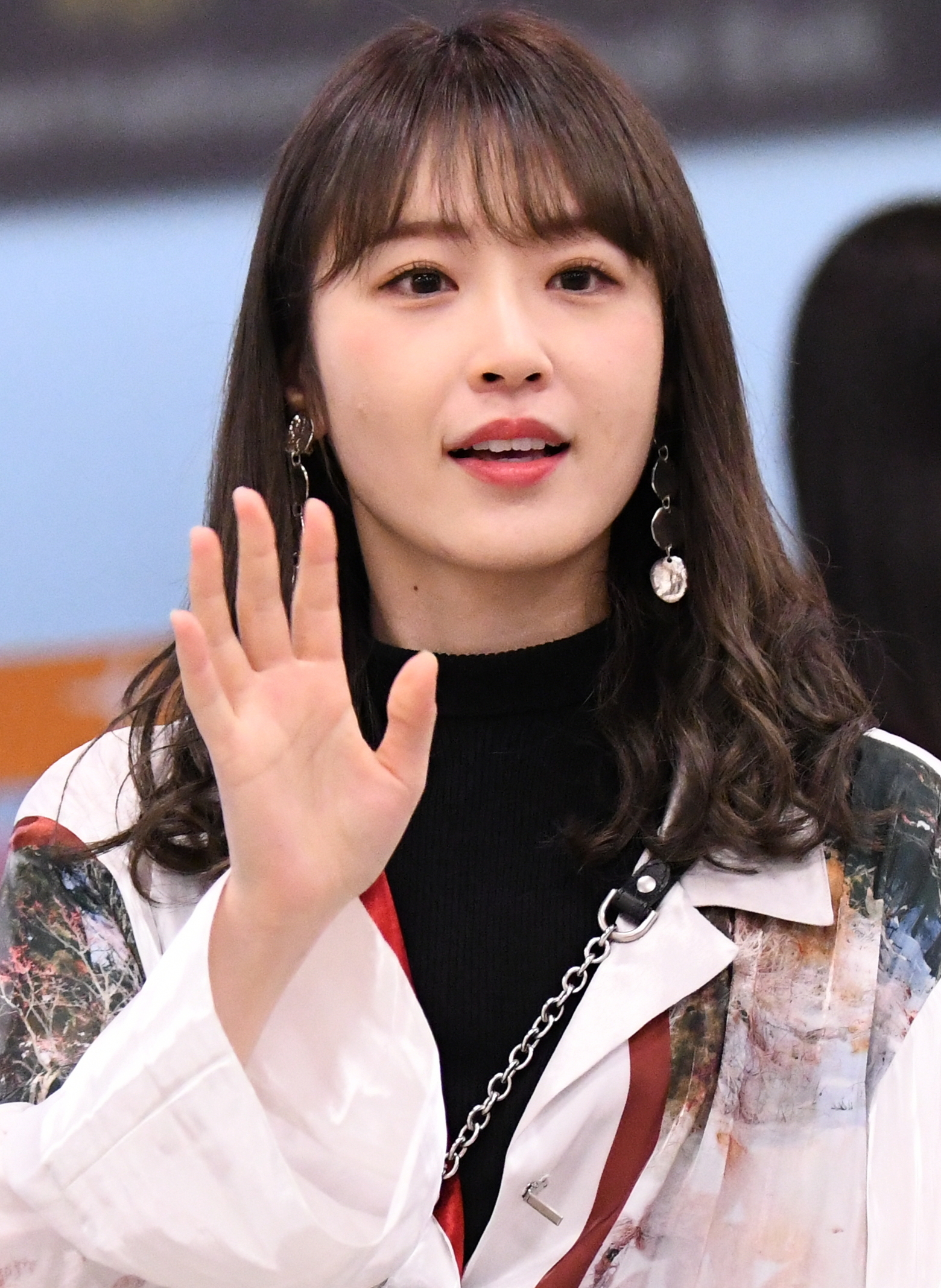
- Takayama in 2020
- Born: February 8, 1994 (age 32); Minamibōsō, Chiba Prefecture, Japan
- Occupations: Novelist; television presenter
- Years active: 2011–present
- Agent: Nogizaka46.LLC
- Notable work: Trapezium
- Spouse: Ken Fukura (m. 2024; div. 2025)
- Musical career
- Genres: J-pop
- Instrument: vocals
- Years active: 2011–2021
- Label: Sony Records/N46Div
- Formerly of: Nogizaka46
- Website: kazumitakayama.com

Kazumi Takayama (高山 一実, Takayama Kazumi; born February 8, 1994) is a Japanese novelist and television presenter. She is a former first generation member of the Japanese idol group Nogizaka46, a co-author of the self-help book Investment Methods that Keep My Money Growing Even Though I'm An Idol, and author of the novel Trapezium.

== Early life ==
Takayama was born on February 8, 1994, in now Minamibōsō, Chiba Prefecture. She attended a small school in which she had the same classmates for many years, and she trained in kendo throughout elementary school and junior high school.

== Career ==
=== Nogizaka46 ===
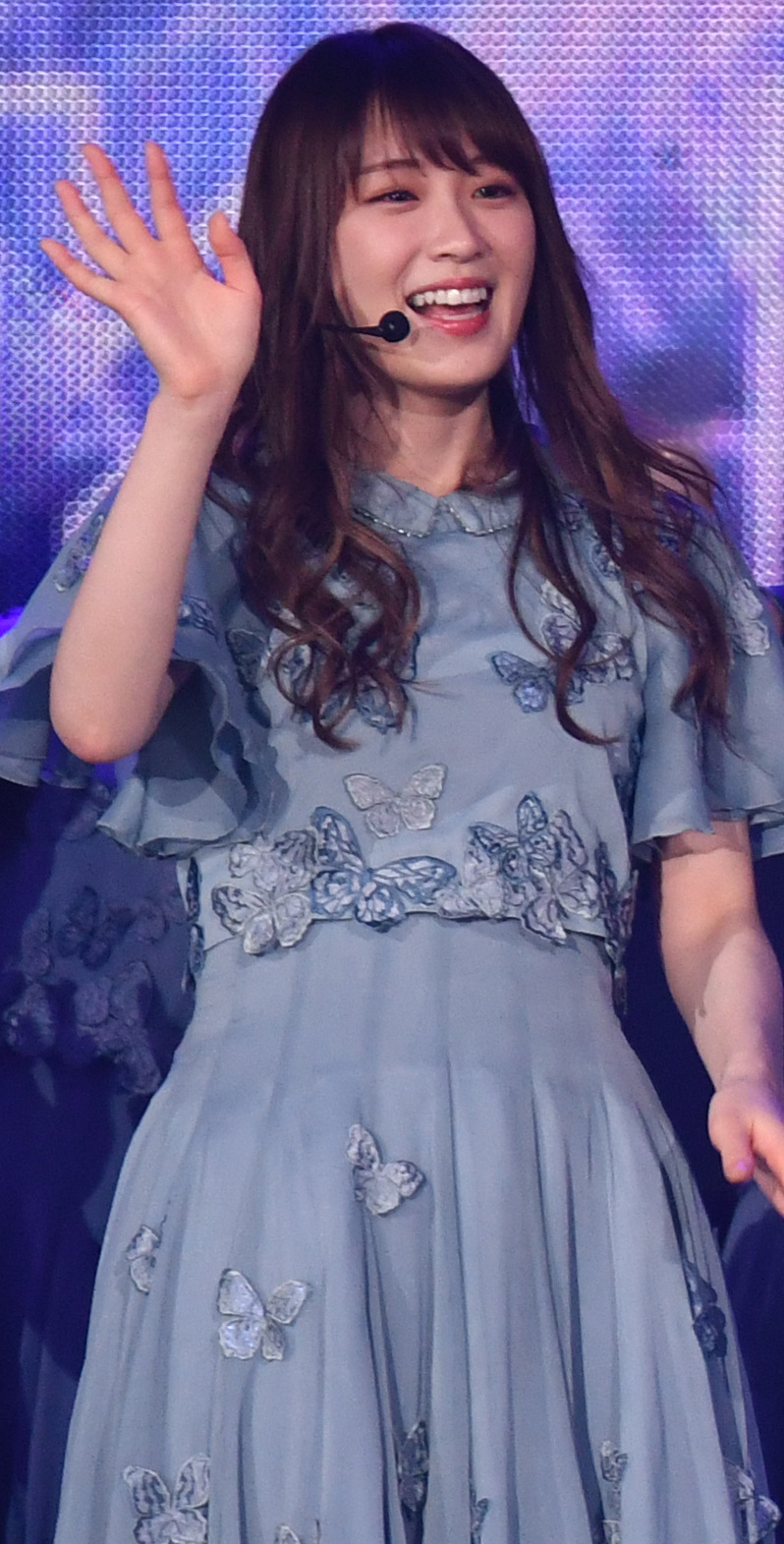
Takayama performing with Nogizaka46 in Taipei, Taiwan in 2019

Takayama's entertainment career began in 2011 when she successfully auditioned for the first generation of the idol group Nogizaka46. Beginning with the group's first release, Takayama was regularly selected as one of the main recording and performing members on Nogizaka46 singles. She also performed on B-sides, including a 2012 acoustic duet with Mai Shiraishi, titled "Shibuya Blues", on Nogizaka46's fifth single "Seifuku no Mannequin". Takayama performed as part of the main selection group on every Nogizaka46 single released during her tenure. In 2016, her first solo photobook, titled Maybe it's Love (恋かもしれない, Koi kamo Shirenai), was published. The photos in the book were taken on location in her hometown of Minamibōsō. Her second photobook, Monologue (独白, Dokuhaku), with photos taken in Helsinki, was published in 2019. In the Oricon weekly book sales ranking for its first week of publication, Monologue placed first in the photobook category. Takayama made her final appearance as a member of the group in their November 2021 concert at Tokyo Dome, and wrote a short story titled The Name of Hope that was distributed to concert attendees.

=== Writing ===
Takayama made her literary debut in January 2016 with the short story Carry-over (キャリーオーバー), which was published on the website of Japanese magazine Da Vinci and illustrated by fellow Nogizaka46 member Mai Fukagawa. The next year she worked with Japanese investor Taizen Okuyama to learn about investing and track her own progress as an investor, which she and Okuyama then wrote about in a book published by PHP titled Investment Methods that Keep My Money Growing Even Though I'm An Idol (お金がずっと増え続ける投資のメソッド: アイドルのわたしでも, Okane ga Zutto Fuetsuzukeru Tōshi no Mesoddo: Aidoru no Watashi demo).

From May 2016 to September 2018, Takayama wrote a serialized novel titled Trapezium (トラペジウム, Torapejiumu) that was published in installments in Da Vinci. Trapezium tells the story of a young girl who has to make difficult choices to realize her dream of becoming an idol. The novel was published in a single volume in November 2018 by Kadokawa Shoten. In December 2018 the novel placed first in the Oricon book ranking in the literary category. The publisher had to stop reprinting the book after the fourth printing, as inventory of the special paper used for the book's cover ran out. A limited edition of the book with a wrapper containing commentary from fellow Nogizaka46 member Nanase Nishino was subsequently published. In 2024, director Masahiro Shinohara and screenwriter Yūko Kakihara adapted Trapezium into an animated film, with Asaki Yuikawa voicing the lead role and Nanase Nishino and Takayama each voicing cameo roles.

=== Acting ===
As a Nogizaka46 member, Takayama took on acting roles in the television adaptation of the manga Bad Boys, the baseball drama Hatsumori Bemars, and the NHK taiga drama Hana Moyu, as well as appearing in advertising campaigns for the Tourism Authority of Thailand, Meiji Dairies, and travel company Jalan. As an individual performer she appeared on several television variety shows, and co-hosted the TBS program All Star After Party. A year after leaving the group, she joined the cast of the 2023 NHK series Chou Ningen Yousai Hiroshi Senki (lit. The War Chronicles of Superhuman Fortress Hiroshi) in the role of Akemi Bardot, marking Takayama's first lead acting role.

== Personal life ==
In July 2024, Takayama announced her marriage to Ken Fukura, a quiz writer and video producer for QuizKnock who works under the name FukuraP. However the couple announced their divorce on December 27, 2025.

== Selected works ==
=== Television ===
Year	Title	Role	Notes	Ref(s)
2013	Bad Boys J	Haruka Momose		
2015	Hatsumori Bemars	Kote		
2015	Burning Flower		Taiga drama; cameo	
2023	The War Chronicles of Superhuman Fortress Hiroshi	Akemi Bardot		

=== Film ===
Year	Title	Role	Notes	Ref(s)
2024	Trapezium	Old man	Voice cameo	

=== Books ===
- (co-author, with Taizen Okuyama) Investment Methods that Keep My Money Growing Even Though I'm An Idol (お金がずっと増え続ける投資のメソッド: アイドルのわたしでも, Okane ga Zutto Fuetsuzukeru Tōshi no Mesoddo: Aidoru no Watashi demo), PHP, 2017, ISBN 9784569838663
- Trapezium (トラペジウム, Torapejiumu), Kadokawa Shoten, 2018, ISBN 9784040686967

=== Photobooks ===
- Maybe it's Love: A Kazumi Takayama Photobook (恋かもしれない: 高山一実写真集, Koi kamo Shirenai: Takayama Kazumi Shashinshū), Gakken Plus, 2016, ISBN 9784054064744
- Monologue: A Kazumi Takayama Photobook (高山一実写真集 独白, Takayama Kazumi Shashinshū: Dokuhaku), Tokuma Shoten, 2019, ISBN 9784198647902
