= Bad Boys (manga) =

1988 manga series by Hiroshi Tanaka

- First tankōbon volume cover, featuring Tsukasa Kiriki (left) and Jouji Kawanaka (center)
- Genre: Action
- Manga
- Written by: Hiroshi Tanaka
- Published by: Shōnen Gahōsha
- Magazine: Young King
- Original run: 1988 – 1996
- Volumes: 22
- Manga

Bad Boys Glare
- Written by: Hiroshi Tanaka
- Published by: Shōnen Gahōsha
- Magazine: Young King
- Original run: 1996 – 2003
- Volumes: 16
- Original video animation
- Directed by: Osamu Sekita; Takeshi Yamaguchi
- Music by: Hiroaki Yoshino
- Studio: J.C.Staff
- Released: September 25, 1993 – August 9, 1998
- Runtime: 30 minutes
- Episodes: 5
- Live-action film
- Directed by: Takashi Kubota
- Released: March 26, 2011
- Runtime: 93 minutes
- Television drama

Bad Boys J
- Original network: NTV
- Original run: April 6, 2013 – June 22, 2013
- Episodes: 12

Bad Boys (stylized as BADBOYS) is a manga series written and illustrated by Hiroshi Tanaka. It was adapted into an OVA and a live action film and it was adapted into a Japanese television drama series. As of 2021, the manga has sold 55 million copies, making it one of the best-selling manga series.

== Synopsis ==
To impress a girl, Tsukasa Kirki dives into the dangerous world of Hiroshima delinquents. Through determination, he defeats the leader of the Gokuraku Cho motorcycle gang and inherits the throne as the eighth leader.
