= 2015 in Japanese music =

The year 2015 in Japanese music.

== Notable events ==
- The sold-out two-day Takashi Matsumoto Official 45th Anniversary Project event was held at the Tokyo International Forum on August 21 and 22, celebrating lyricist Takashi Matsumoto's career. Performances included Matsumoto reuniting with the other two surviving members of pioneering Japanese rock band Happy End.
- 66th NHK Kōhaku Uta Gassen on December 31.

== Number-ones ==
- Oricon number-one albums
- Oricon number-one singles
- Hot 100 number-one singles

== Best-selling records ==
=== Best-selling albums ===
The following is a list of the top 10 best-selling albums in Japan in 2015, according to Oricon.

Rank	Album	Artist	Copies
1	Japonism	Arashi	981,639
2	Planet Seven	Sandaime J Soul Brothers from Exile Tribe	868,247
3	Dreams Come True The Best! Watashi no Dorikamu	Dreams Come True	828,505
4	Koko ga Rhodes da, Koko de Tobe!	AKB48	780,591
5	0 to 1 no Aida	AKB48	687,688
6	Reflection	Mr. Children	576,867
7	Budō	Southern All Stars	534,482
8	Tree	Sekai no Owari	484,588
9	Kanjani Eight no genki ga deru CD!!	Kanjani Eight	348,197
10	Kis-My-World	Kis-My-Ft2	336,069

=== Best-selling singles ===
The following is a list of the top 10 best-selling singles in Japan in 2015, according to Oricon.

Rank	Single	Artist	Copies
1	"Bokutachi wa Tatakawanai"	AKB48	1,782,707
2	"Halloween Night"	AKB48	1,328,411
3	"Green Flash"	AKB48	1,045,492
4	"Kuchibiru ni Be My Baby"	AKB48	905,490
5	"Coquettish Jūtai Chū"	SKE48	702,299
6	"Ima, Hanashitai Dareka ga Iru"	Nogizaka46	686,539
7	"Taiyō Nokku"	Nogizaka46	678,481
8	"Inochi wa Utsukushii"	Nogizaka46	620,555
9	"Aozora no Shita, Kimi no Tonari"	Arashi	571,597
10	"Don't Look Back!"	NMB48	530,830

== Awards ==
- 57th Japan Record Awards
- 2015 MTV Video Music Awards Japan

== Albums released ==
=== January ===
Date	Album	Artist	Genre	Labels
28	Planet Seven	Sandaime J Soul Brothers	J-pop	Rhythm Zone

=== February ===
Date	Album	Artist	Genre	Labels
4	Colour by Number	Monkey Majik	Rock	Binyl Records
11	Imademo	Kim Hyun-joong		Universal Music Japan
18	Call Me...	Pentagon		Goemon Records
25	Last Song	Seo In-guk		Nippon Crown

=== March ===
Date	Album	Artist	Genre	Labels
4	Epic Day	B'z	Hard rock, pop rock	Vermillion Records
18	Action	U-KISS		Avex Trax
18	After School Best	After School		Avex Trax
25	19: Road to Amazing World	Exile		Rhythm Zone

=== April ===
Date	Album	Artist	Genre	Labels
1	Present	Donghae & Eunhyuk		Avex Trax
15	2PM of 2PM	2PM		Epic Records Japan

=== May ===
Date	Album	Artist	Genre	Labels
27	Brand-New Idol Shit	BiSH	J-pop	Sub Trax

=== June ===
Date	Album	Artist	Genre	Labels
17	ALXD	Alexandros	Rock	Universal J / RX-Records

=== September ===
Date	Album	Artist	Genre	Labels
16	Positive	Tofubeats	J-pop	Unborde
30	Colors	CNBLUE	Rock	Warner Music Japan

=== November ===
Date	Album	Artist	Genre	Labels
18	New Beginning	Band-Maid	Hard rock, heavy metal	Gump Records
18	Close to You	Max Changmin	J-pop	Avex Trax
25	Love Letter	Jun. K	J-pop	Epic Records Japan

=== December ===
Date	Album	Artist	Genre	Labels
2	Yellow Dancer	Gen Hoshino		Speedstar Records
16	For You	Infinite		Delicious Deli Records
23	°Cmaj9	Cute	J-pop	Zetima

== Debuting ==
=== Debuting groups ===
- 2o Love to Sweet Bullet
- 3776
- Akishibu Project
- Billie Idle
- Bish
- Camellia Factory
- Earphones
- Ebisu Muscats
- Exo
- Fate Gear
- High4
- The Hoopers
- Idol Renaissance
- Iginari Tohoku San
- Kolme
- La PomPon
- Ladybaby
- lol
- Magnolia Factory
- Mrs. Green Apple
- Myth & Roid
- Official Hige Dandism
- OxT
- Pasocom Music Club
- The Peggies
- Pentagon
- POP
- Srv.Vinci
- Sora tob sakana
- Suchmos
- Tacoyaki Rainbow
- Tahiti
- Tokimeki Sendenbu
- TrySail
- Wednesday Campanella
- Whiteeeen

=== Debuting soloists ===
- Aimyon
- Anly
- Daoko
- Inori Minase
- Max Changmin
- Reol
- Sakura Fujiwara

== Deaths ==
- July 6 – Masabumi Kikuchi, Japanese-American pianist and composer (b. 1939)

== See also ==
- 2015 in Japan
- 2015 in Japanese television
- List of Japanese films of 2015
