= Asuka Saitō =

Japanese actress, model and television presenter (born 1998)

- 齋藤 飛鳥
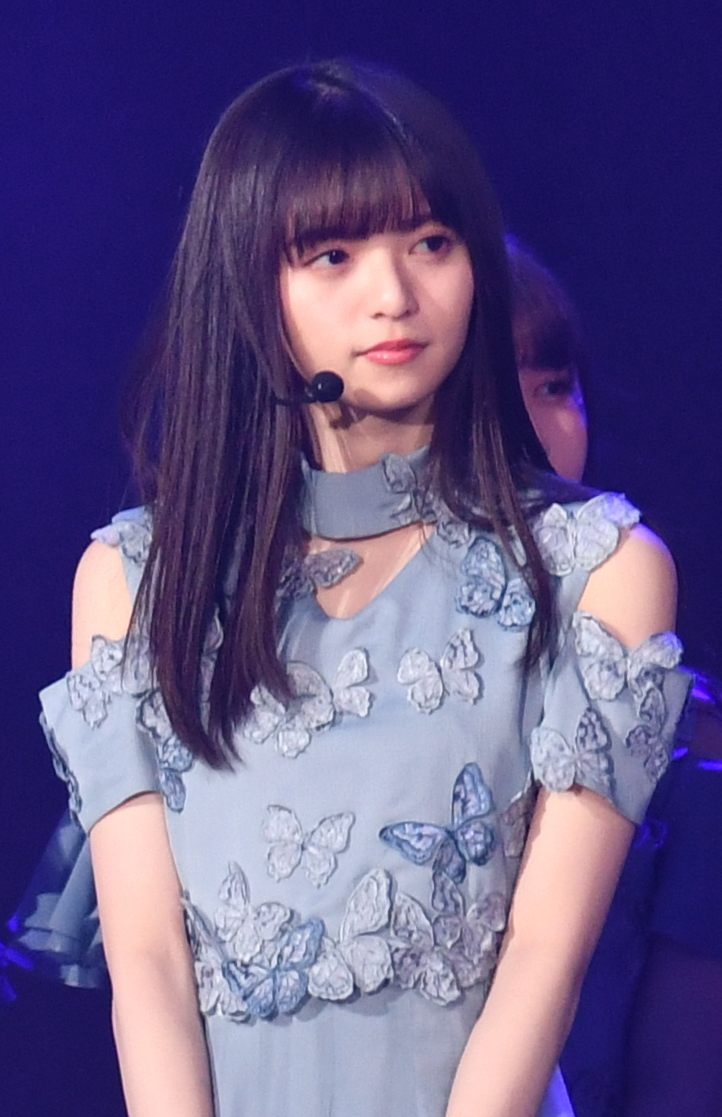
- Saito in Taipei in 2019
- Born: August 10, 1998 (age 28); Katsushika, Tokyo, Japan
- Occupations: Actress; model; television presenter
- Years active: 2007–present
- Agent: Nogizaka46.LLC
- Height: 158 cm (5 ft 2 in)
- Musical career
- Genre: J-pop
- Instruments: Vocals; drums
- Years active: 2011–2023
- Label: Sony Records
- Formerly of: Nogizaka46
- Website: asukasaito.jp

Signature
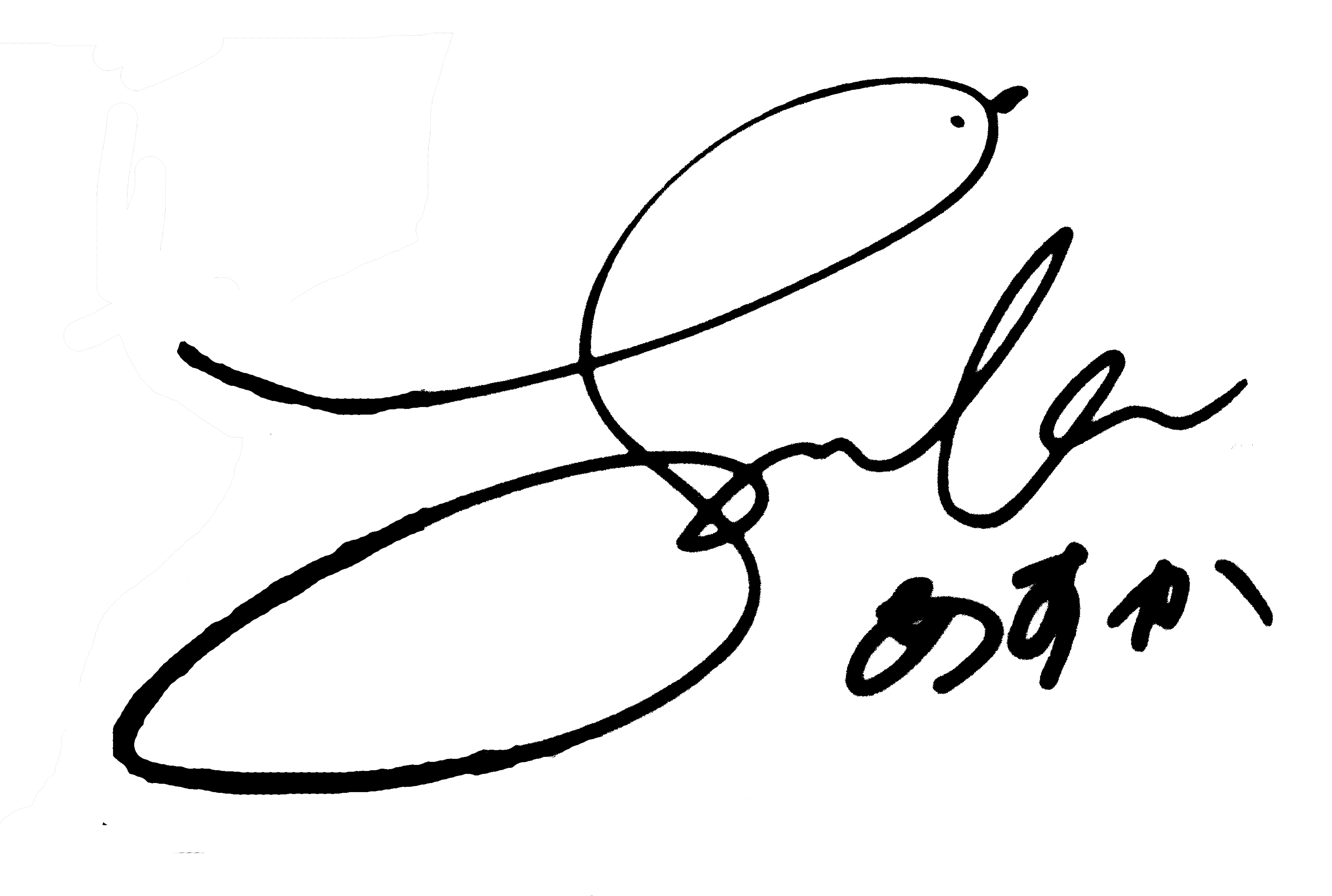

Asuka Saitō (齋藤 飛鳥(さいとう あすか), Saitō Asuka; born August 10, 1998) is a Japanese actress, model, and television presenter. She is a former first generation member of the idol girl group Nogizaka46 and a regular model for the fashion magazine sweet.

As an actress, her lead roles have included Mana Hayase in the Japanese remake of the Taiwanese film You Are the Apple of My Eye and Midori Asakusa in both the film and television adaptations of the manga Keep Your Hands Off Eizouken!.

== Early life ==
Saitō was born on August 10, 1998, in Katsushika, Tokyo, to a Burmese mother and Japanese father. She has two older brothers.

When Saitō was in her latter years of elementary school, she was bullied by her classmates and, despite reaching out, received no help from her teachers, prompting her to stop attending school for a period of time. This resulted in a withdrawn personality as a consequence, which she eventually overcame after joining Nogizaka46.

== Career ==
=== Early career: child actress ===
Saitō debuted as an actress in 2007 in the film Sakuran, playing the protagonist as a child. She had also appeared in a number of commercials.

=== 2011–2023: Nogizaka46 ===
In 2011, encouraged by her mother she auditioned for [then] an upcoming J-pop idol girl group, she successfully passed the audition for the first generation of idol group Nogizaka46, debuting as an idol on the group's first single "Guruguru Curtain" in February 2012. Saitō became the center member on the 15th Nogizaka46 single, "Hadashi de Summer", in 2016.

In 2015, Saitō became the exclusive model for the fashion magazine CUTiE published by Takarajimasha, which stopped publication in the same year. Saitō then became a regular model for another fashion magazine from the same publisher, sweet, as the magazine's youngest model since its publication.

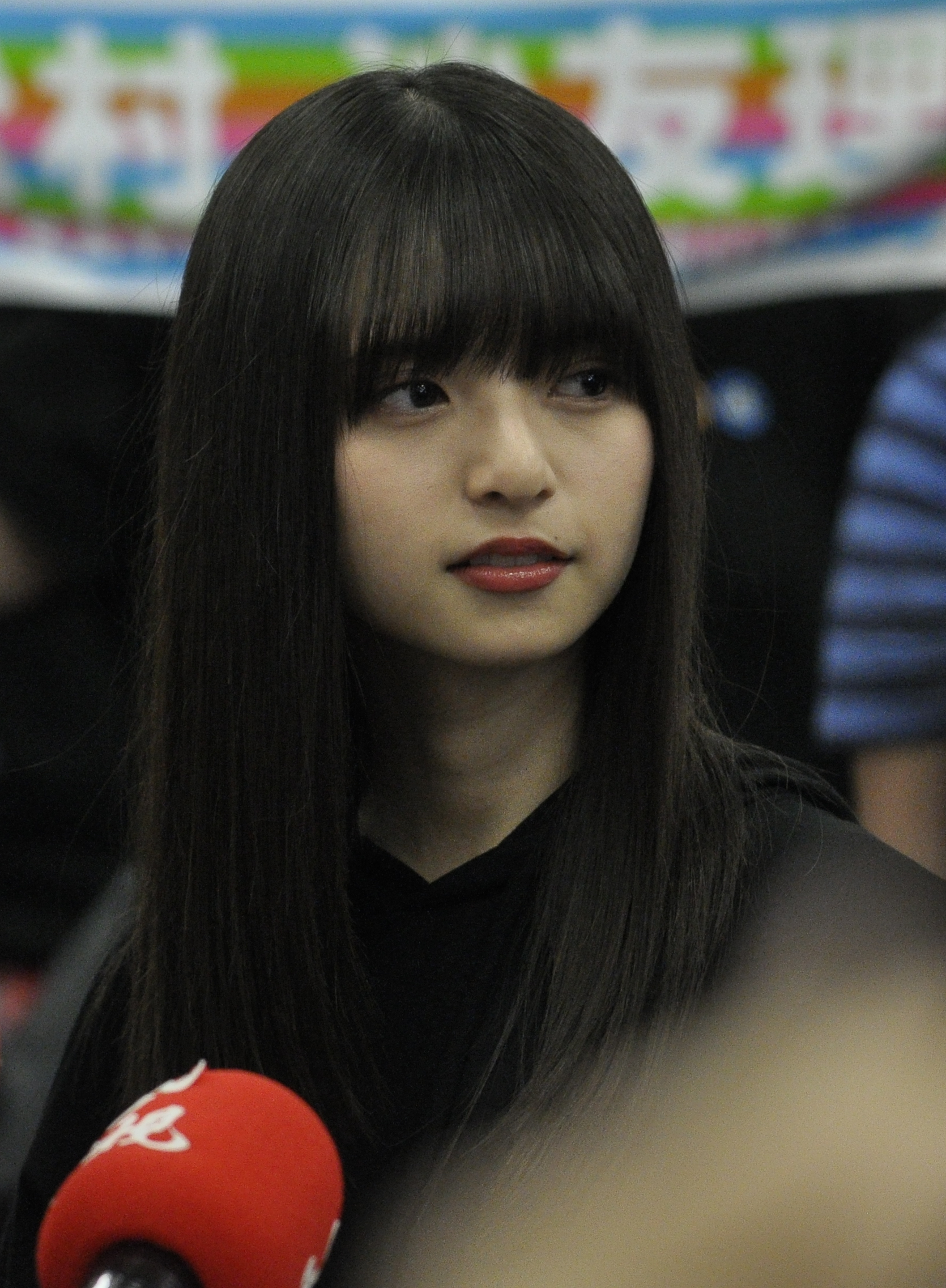
Saito at a press conference in Taiwan in 2018

In 2017, Gentosha published Saitō's first photobook. Titled Shiosai, the photobook sold 58,215 copies in the first week. As of December 2018, the photobook has sold over two-hundred thousand copies.

Saitō announced her graduation from Nogizaka46 on November 4, 2022. She would stay in the group until the end of 2022 and plans a graduation concert in 2023. She is the penultimate first generation member to leave the group. Asuka officially graduated from the group on December 31, 2022, and her graduation concert took place on May 17–18, 2023, at the Tokyo Dome, attended by about 100 thousand people.

=== Acting ===
Saitō was active as an actress and model outside of Nogizaka46. She has played lead roles in the Japanese remake of the Taiwanese film You Are the Apple of My Eye and the NTV horror drama Zambi. After departing from Nogizaka46, Saitō returned to full-time acting. In March 2023, it was announced that she would portray Riko in the crime and suspense film Side by Side directed by Chihiro Ito.

On January 9, 2023, it was revealed that Saitō was cast for both the film and television drama live-action adaptation of the manga My Home Hero as Reika Tosu, an 18-year-old college student trapped in an abusive relationship at the start of the story and who later becomes a police investigator after a timeskip. The movie is scheduled to air in March 2024.

In January 23, 2024, it was announced that she is also set to star as Ai Hoshino for the live-action film adaptation of the manga Oshi no Ko.

On January 21, 2025, she won the Newcomer of the Year award at the 48th Japan Academy Film Prize for her role in Oshi no Ko: The Final Act. On June 8, Saitō was officially appointed as the ambassador for the "National Green and Flower Fair Katsushika," held in her hometown of Katsushika Ward. On July 5 of the same year, she launched her first solo variety talk show, Saito Asuka's Let's Drink and Go Home Tonight, which began airing on the Nippon Television Network.

== Discography ==
=== Singles with Nogizaka46 ===
Year	No.	Title	Role	Notes
2012	1	"Guruguru Curtain"	A-side	Debuted as a 1st Generation member; Also sang on "Nogizaka no Uta", "Aitakatta Kamoshirenai", "Ushinaitakunai kara" and "Shiroi Kumo ni Notte"
2012	2	"Oide Shampoo"	B-side	Does not sing on title track. Sang on "Ōkami ni Kuchibue o" as Under Member
2012	3	"Hashire! Bicycle"	B-side	Does not sing on title track. Sang on "Kairyū no Shima yo" as Under Member
2012	4	"Seifuku no Mannequin"	A-side	Also sang on "Yubi Bōenkyō" and "Yasashisa Nara Ma ni Atteru"
2013	5	"Kimi no Na wa Kibō"	B-side	Does not sing on title track. Sang on "Shakiism" and "13nichi no Kinyobi" as Under Member
2013	6	"Girl's Rule"	B-side	Does not sing on title track. Sang on "Senpūki" as Under Member and "Ningen to Iu Gakki"
2013	7	"Barrette"	A-side	Also sang on "Tsuki no Ōkisa" and "Sonna Baka na…"
2014	8	"Kizuitara Kataomoi"	B-side	Does not sing on title track. Sang on "Toiki no Method" and "Umareta Mama de" as Under Member
2014	9	"Natsu no Free & Easy"	B-side	Does not sing on title track. Sang on "Koko ni Iru Riyū" as Under Member
2014	10	"Nandome no Aozora ka?"	B-side	Does not sing on title track. Sang on "Watashi, Okiru" and "Ano Hi Boku wa Tossa ni Uso o Tsuita" as Under Member
2015	11	"Inochi wa Utsukushii"	A-side	Also sang on "Arakajime Katarareru Romance"
2015	12	"Taiyō Nokku"	A-side	Also sang on "Hane no Kioku" and "Seifuku o Nuide Sayonara o…"
2015	13	"Ima, Hanashitai Dareka ga Iru"	A-side	Also sang on "Popipappapā" and "Kanashimi no Wasurekata"
2016	14	"Harujion ga Sakukoro"	A-side	Also sang on "Harukanaru Bhutan"
2016	15	"Hadashi de Summer"	A-side, center	Also sang on "Boku Dake no Hikari"
2016	16	"Sayonara no Imi"	A-side	Also sang on "Kodoku na Aozora" and "Ano Kyōshitsu"
2017	17	"Influencer"	A-side	Also sang on "Another Ghost"
2017	18	"Nigemizu"	A-side	Also sang on "Onna wa Hitori ja Nemurenai", "Hito Natsu no Nagasa Yori…" and "Naitatte Iijanaika?"
2017	19	"Itsuka Dekiru kara Kyō Dekiru"	A-side, center	Shared center position with Nanase Nishino; Also sang on "Fuminshō"
2018	20	"Synchronicity"	A-side	Also sang on "Against" as 1st Generation member
2018	21	"Jikochū de Ikō!"	A-side, center	Also sang on "Chikyū ga Maruinara " and "Anna ni Sukidatta no ni…"
2018	22	"Kaerimichi wa Tōmawari Shitaku Naru"	A-side	Also sang on "Caravan wa Nemuranai" and "Shiritai Koto "
2019	23	"Sing Out!"	A-side, center	Also sang on "No Yō na Sonzai"
2019	24	"Yoake Made Tsuyogaranakutemoii"	A-side	Also sang on "Boku no Koto, Shitteru?", "Romendensha no Machi" and "Boku no Omoikomi"
2020	25	"Shiawase no Hogoshoku"	A-side	Also sang on "Sayonara Stay With Me", "Romendensha no Machi" and "Fantastic Sanshoku Pan"
2020	—	"Sekaijū no Rinjin yo"	—	Charity song during the COVID-19 pandemic
2020	—	"Route 246"	Center	
2021	26	"Boku wa Boku o Suki ni Naru"	A-side	Also sang on "Ashita ga Aru Riyū" and "Wilderness World"
2021	27	"Gomen ne Fingers Crossed"	A-side	Also sang on "Zenbu Yume no Mama"
2021	28	"Kimi ni Shikarareta"	A-side	Also sang on "Dorodarake" and "Tanin no Sora ni"
2021	—	"Saigo no Tight Hug"	A-side	
2022	29	"Actually..."	Center	Shared center position with Mizuki Yamashita; Also sang on "Fukayomi" and "Suki ni Nattemita"
2022	30	"Suki to Iu no wa Rock da ze!"	A-side	
2022	31	"Koko ni wa Nai Mono"	Center	Last single to participate

=== Albums with Nogizaka46 ===
Year	No.	Title	Participated song
2015	1	Tōmei na Iro	"Nazo no Rakugaki"; "Jiyū no Kanata "
2016	2	Sorezore no Isu	"Kikkake"; "Taiyō ni Kudokarete"; "Threefold Choice"
2017	3	Umarete Kara Hajimete Mita Yume	"Skydiving"; "Settei Ondo"; "Katai Kara no Yō ni Dakishimetai" (Solo)
2019	4	Ima ga Omoide ni Naru made	"Arigachi na Ren'ai"; "Mosugu ~Zambi Densetsu~"

=== Other featured songs ===
Year	Artist	Title	Albums / Singles
2017	AKB48	"Dare no Koto o Ichiban Aishiteru"	"Shoot Sign"
2017	Mondo Grosso	"Wakusei Tantra"	Nando Demo Atarashiku Umareru
2018	AKB48	"Kokkyo no Nai Jidai"	"Jabaja"
2019	AKB48	"Hitsuzensei"	"Jiwaru Days"
2021	Nogizaka46	"Hard to Say"	"Time Flies"
2022	Mondo Grosso	"Stranger"	Big World

== Filmography ==
=== Film ===
Year	Title	Role	Notes	Ref(s)
2007	Sakuran	Tomeki		
2018	You Are the Apple of My Eye	Mana Hayase	Lead role	
2020	Keep Your Hands Off Eizouken! The Movie	Midori Asakusa	Lead role	
2023	Side by Side	Riko		
2024	My Home Hero: The Movie	Reika Tosu		
2024	Oshi no Ko: The Final Act	Ai Hoshino		
2025	Unforgettable	Yuri Umino		
2026	The Keeper of the Camphor Tree	Yumi Saji (voice)		
2027	Saturday Night Theatre	Akane Serizawa		

=== Television drama ===
Year	Title	Role	Notes	Ref(s)
2016	A Girl's Dream	Nanami Hidaka		
2016	Tales of the Unusual: Summer Special 2016 "Another Elevator"	Kimiko Shishido		
2019	Zambi	Kanade Yamamuro	Lead role	
2020	Keep Your Hands Off Eizouken!	Midori Asakusa	Lead role	
2020	Murdered Remotely	Yumiko Tamura		
2023	My Home Hero	Reika Tosu		
2023	My Beloved Flower	Konomi Ushio		
2024	Oshi no Ko	Ai Hoshino		
2024	Light of My Lion	Mio Makimura		
2025	Murderous Encounter	Mikuru Shitara	Episode 1 and 5	
2026	Themis' Uncertain Court	Aki Yoshizawa	Episode 4	
2026	Until the T-shirt Dries	Miki		
2026	Mame to Mugi	Mugi Shimizu	Lead role	

=== Variety show ===
Year	Title	Role	Notes	Ref(s)
2026	Another Sky	Co-host		

=== Music video appearances ===
Year	Title	Artist	Ref(s)
2023	"Life"	Gen Hoshino	
2024	"Fujin"	Vaundy	

== Bibliography ==
=== Photobooks ===
- Kikan Nogizaka vol.3 Ryōshū (4 September 2014, Tokyo News Service) ISBN 9784863364264
- Shiosai (25 January 2017, Gentosha) ISBN 9784344030534
- Museum (23 May 2023, Kodansha)

== Awards and nominations ==
Year	Award	Category	Work(s)	Result	Ref.
2025	48th Japan Academy Film Prize	Newcomer of the Year	Oshi no Ko: The Final Act	Won	
