= Erika Ikuta =

Japanese singer and actress (born 1997)

- 生田 絵梨花
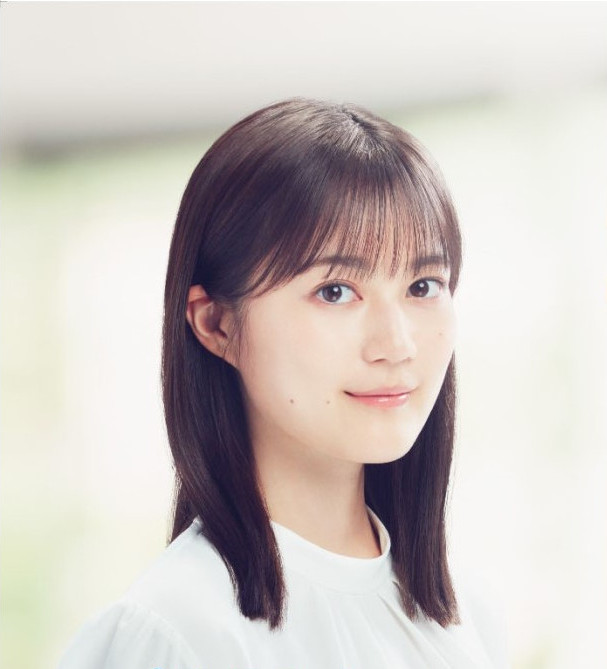
- Ikuta in 2022
- Born: 22 January 1997 (age 29); Düsseldorf, North Rhine-Westphalia, Germany
- Other name: Hanae Ikegami
- Citizenship: Japanese
- Occupations: Actress; singer
- Years active: 2007–present
- Hometown: Tokyo, Japan
- Agents: Ohta Production (2007–2009, 2022–present); Nogizaka46.LLC (2011–2021)
- Musical career
- Genres: J-pop; Musical theatre
- Instruments: Vocals; piano
- Years active: 2011–present
- Labels: Sony Records/N46Div (2011–2021); Gr8! Records (2024–present)
- Formerly of: Nogizaka46
- Website: erikaikuta.jp

Signature
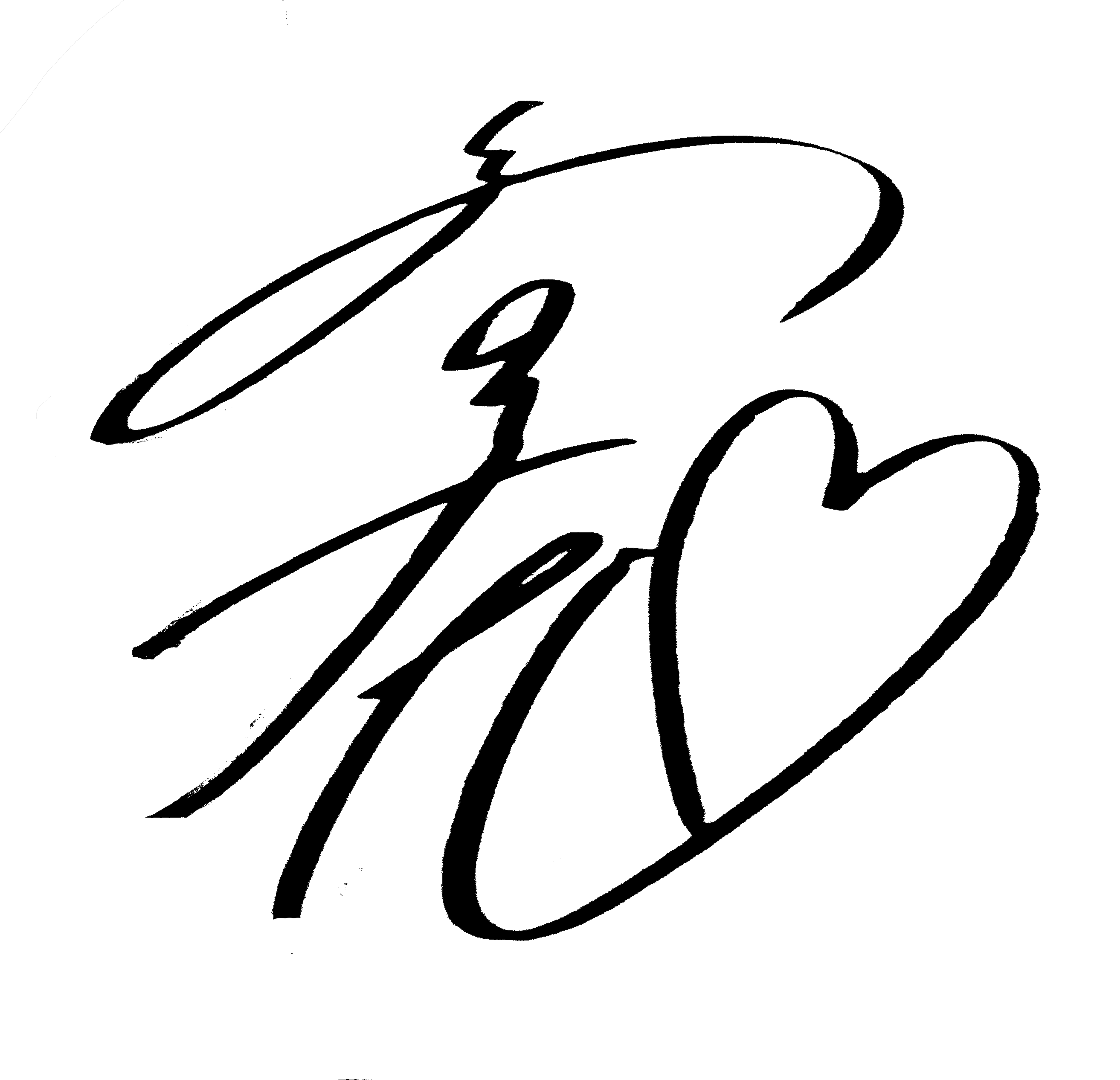

Erika Ikuta (生田 絵梨花, Ikuta Erika; born January 22, 1997) is a Japanese actress, singer, and former first generation member of the Japanese idol girl group Nogizaka46. In addition to her work with Nogizaka46, Ikuta has appeared in multiple television and stage productions, including playing Cosette, Éponine and Fantine in a Japanese production of Les Misérables and voicing Asha in the Japanese dubbing of the Disney film Wish.

She is affiliated with Ohta Production from 2007 to 2009 and once again since 2022.

== Early life and career ==
Ikuta was born on January 22, 1997, in Düsseldorf, Germany. She began taking piano lessons at the age of four under the influence of her older sister, who had taken them before her. Her family moved to Tokyo when she was five.

She made her entertainment debut as a child actress in 2007, starring in the musical Coco Smile: Asu e no Rock 'n' Roll. She was affiliated with Ohta Production during that time.

In 2011, she auditioned for Nogizaka46 and was selected as one of the thirty-six first generation members. Her audition song was Aiko's "Star". She was chosen as one of the members performing on the group's debut single "Guruguru Curtain", released on February 22, 2012. In September 2012, she was selected for the leading role of Alice in Nogizaka46's stage musical Sixteen Principal.

On April 20, 2014, she announced that she would take a break from Nogizaka46 to prepare for further schooling. She resumed her activities in August as the choreographic center for Nogizaka46's tenth single "Nandome no Aozora ka?". In 2015, Ikuta appeared in the Fuji TV drama Zannen na Otto as a high school girl who dreams of becoming a pianist. She published her first solo photobook, Tenchō, on January 21, 2016. It sold 38,355 copies in its first week, and ranked first on the Oricon weekly photobook sales chart. It also ranked first on the Oricon book ranking photobook category in the first half of the year 2016.

In July 2016, it was announced that Ikuta had been chosen for the role of Cosette in a 30th anniversary production of Les Miserables in Japan in 2017, a role she reprised in 2019. In early 2021, It was announced that Ikuta would play Éponine in Les Miserables in spring till autumn 2021. In 2024, it was announced that Ikuta would play Fantine in Les Miserables from late December 2024 till mid June 2025. She is also the second actress in Japan to play both Cosette, Éponine and Fantine in Les Miserables, Rina Chinen was the first actress to do so.

In January 2021, she and fellow Nogizaka46 member Sayuri Matsumura performed a cover of the song "1・2・3" by Mafumafu and Soraru; the song was used as an opening theme to the anime series Pokémon Master Journeys: The Series. On October 25, Ikuta announced she will graduate from Nogizaka46 on December 31, 2021 on her official blog. Her graduation concert took place at the Yokohama Arena on December 14 and 15. She sang and performed on the stage of the 72nd NHK Kouhaku Uta Gassen on December 31, and it was her last activity as a member of Nogizaka46.

On January 5, 2022, five days after her graduation from Nogizaka46, Ikuta announced her return to her talent agency during her days as a child actress, Ohta Production. On January 8, her official Twitter account was opened. On February 1, her official website was opened (with a fan event on 19 to commemorate the occasion), while her Nogizaka46 blog posts were deleted.

Ikuta's first post-Nogizaka46 acting role was as Mio Mukai in the Fuji TV series Gossip: #Kanojo ga Shiritai Honto no 〇〇.

Her second fan event, "Erika Ikuta 2022 summer fun", was held on August 3, 2022 at Zepp DiverCity and August 6 at Zepp Namba.

On November 1, 2022, her first calendar was released. It was available to the members of her official website until December 31.

Her third fan event, "Erika Ikuta 2022 winter fun", was held on December 3, 2022 at Zepp Osaka Bayside and on December 11 at KT Zepp Yokohama.

Her first solo tour, "Erika Ikuta Autumn Live Tour 2023", ran from September 10 to 17, 2023, spanning Tokyo, Fukuoka, Osaka and Aichi. A final leg of the tour was held on October 5 at the Tokyo International Forum.

On October 13, it was announced that Ikuta will be the Japanese voice of Asha in the Japanese dubbing of the Disney film Wish.

On January 22, 2024, the day of her 27th birthday, Ikuta announced that she will be making her solo singer debut under Gr8! Records with the release of her first extended play, "capriccioso", on April 10. She also opened her official YouTube channel that day.

On May 15, 2024, it was announced that Ikuta will star in her first lead role in a public TV drama, Subarashiki Kana, Sensei!.

== Discography ==
=== Studio albums ===
List of studio albums, showing selected details, chart positions, and sales
Title	Details	Peaks		Sales
Title	Details	JPN	JPN Cmb.	Sales
I.K.T	Released: April 22, 2026; Label: Sony; Formats: CD, CD+Blu-ray, DL, streaming	6	9	JPN: 9,220

=== Extended plays ===
List of extended plays, showing selected details, chart positions, and sales
Title	Details	Peak positions			Sales
Title	Details	JPN	JPN Cmb.	JPN Hot	Sales
Capriccioso	Released: April 10, 2024; Label: Sony; Formats: CD, CD+Blu-ray, DL, streaming	5	5	5	JPN: 14,778
Bitter Candy	Released: March 5, 2025; Label: Sony; Formats: CD, CD+Blu-ray, DL, streaming	12	15	—	JPN: 6,916
"—" denotes releases that did not chart or were not released in that region.

=== Singles ===
List of singles, showing year released, selected chart positions, and album name
Title	Year	Peaks		Album
Title	Year	JPN	JPN Hot	Album
"This Wish"	2023	—	97	Wish (Japanese Edition)
"Welcome to Rosas"	2023	—	—	Wish (Japanese Edition)
"Laundry"	2024	—	—	Capriccioso
"No One Compares"	2024	—	—	Capriccioso
"Kakurenbo"	2024	—	—	Bitter Candy
"Mont Blanc"	2024	—	—	Bitter Candy
"Jōdeki"	2025	—	—	Bitter Candy
"Mushi"	2025	—	—	Bitter Candy
"Period"	2025	—	—	I.K.T
"Ima mo, Arigatō"	2026	30	—	I.K.T
"Aoi Haru"	2026	—	—	I.K.T
"Nyantokanyaruru"	2026	24	—	TBA
"—" denotes releases that did not chart or were not released in that region.

=== Singles with Nogizaka46 ===
Year	No.	Title	Role	Notes
2012	1	"Guruguru Curtain"	A-side	Debut as 1st Generation member; Also sang on "Nogizaka no Uta", "Aitakatta Kamoshirenai", "Ushinaitakunai kara" and "Shiroi Kumo ni Notte"
2012	2	"Oide Shampoo"	A-side	Also sang on "Kokoro no Kusuri" and "House!"
2012	3	"Hashire! Bicycle"	A-side	Also sang on "Hito wa Naze Hashiru no ka" and "Oto ga Denai Guitar"
2012	4	"Seifuku no Mannequin"	A-side	Also sang on "Yubi Bōenkyō" and "Koko Janai Doko ka "
2013	5	"Kimi no Na wa Kibō"	A-side	Also sang on "Shakiism" and "Romantic Ikayaki"
2013	6	"Girl's Rule"	A-side	Also sang on "Sekai de Ichiban Kodoku na Lover" and "Ningen to Iu Gakki"
2013	7	"Barrette"	A-side	Also sang on "Tsuki no Ōkisa", "Sonna Baka na…" and "Yasashisa to wa"
2014	8	"Kizuitara Kataomoi"	A-side	Also sang on "Romance no Start", "Toiki no Method" and "Dankeschön"
2014	10	"Nandome no Aozora ka?"	A-side, center	Also sang on "Korogatta Kane o Narase!", "Watashi, Okiru" and "Tender days"
2015	11	"Inochi wa Utsukushii"	A-side	Also sang on "Arakajime Katarareru Romance"
2015	12	"Taiyō Nokku"	A-side	Also sang on "Muhyōjō" and "Hane no Kioku"
2015	13	"Ima, Hanashitai Dareka ga Iru"	A-side	Also sang on "Popipappapā" and "Kanashimi no Wasurekata"
2016	14	"Harujion ga Sakukoro"	A-side	Also sang on "Harukanaru Bhutan"
2016	15	"Hadashi de Summer"	A-side	Also sang on "Boku Dake no Hikari" and "Inochi no Shinjitsu Musical "Ringo Uri to Kamemushi"
2016	16	"Sayonara no Imi"	A-side	Also sang on "Kodoku na Aozora"
2017	17	"Influencer"	A-side	
2017	18	"Nigemizu"	A-side	Also sang on "Onna wa Hitori ja Nemurenai", "Hito Natsu no Nagasa Yori…" and "Naitatte Iijanaika?"
2017	19	"Itsuka Dekiru kara Kyō Dekiru"	A-side	Also sang on "Fuminshō" and "Atarashii Kafun ~Musical "Mishiranu Sekai" yori~"
2018	20	"Synchronicity"	A-side	Also sang on "Against" as 1st Generation member and "Kumo ni Nareba ii"
2018	21	"Jikochū de Ikō!"	A-side	Also sang on "Soratobira" and "Anna ni Sukidatta no ni…"
2018	22	"Kaerimichi wa Tōmawari Shitaku Naru"	A-side	Also sang on "Chopin no Usotsuki"
2019	23	"Sing Out!"	A-side	Also sang on "Aimai"
2019	24	"Yoake Made Tsuyogaranakutemoii"	A-side	Also sang on "Boku no Koto, Shitteru?" and "Boku no Omoikomi"
2020	25	"Shiawase no Hogoshoku"	A-side	Also sang on "Sayonara Stay With Me"
2020	—	"Sekaijū no Rinjin yo"	—	Charity song during the COVID-19 pandemic
2020	—	"Route 246"	—	
2021	26	"Boku wa Boku o Suki ni Naru"	A-side	Also sang on "Ashita ga Aru Riyū" and "Wilderness World"
2021	27	"Gomen ne Fingers Crossed"	A-side	Also sang on "Zenbu Yume no Mama"
2021	28	"Kimi ni Shikarareta"	A-side	Last single to participate Also sang on "Yasashii Dake Nara" and "Tanin no Sora ni"

=== Albums with Nogizaka46 ===
Year	No.	Title	Participated song
2015	1	Tōmei na Iro	"Boku ga Iru Basho"; "Anata no Tame ni Hikitai" (solo)
2016	2	Sorezore no Isu	"Kikkake"; "Taiyō ni Kudokarete"; "Teitaion no Kiss" (solo)
2017	3	Umarete Kara Hajimete Mita Yume	"Skydiving"; "Settei Ondo"; "Mangetsu ga Kieta"
2019	4	Ima ga Omoide ni Naru made	"Arigachi na Ren'ai"; "Pocchito"
2021	—	Time Flies	"Saigo no Tight Hug" (center); "Toki no Wadachi" (graduation song, solo)

=== Other featured songs ===
Year	Artist	Title	Albums / Singles
2012	Mayu Watanabe	"Twin Tail wa Mō Shinai"	"Otona Jellybeans"
2016	AKB48	"Mazariau Mono"	"Kimi wa Melody"
2022	Hamaiku	"Beat De Tohi"	"Beat De Tohi"

== Filmography ==
=== Television ===
Year	Title	Role	Notes	Ref(s)
2013	The Case Files of Biblia Bookstore	Mirei Tanabe	Episode 5	
2013	Umi no Ue no Shinryōjo		Episode 1	
2015	Zannen na Otto	Mika Hosoi		
2015	Hatsumori Bemars	Chopin		
2015	Burning Flower		Taiga drama	
2016	True Horror Stories: Summer 2016		Lead role; short drama	
2021	Kakegurui Twin	Sakura Miharutaki		
2022	Gossip: #Kanojo ga Shiritai Honto no 〇〇	Mio Mukai	Episodes 10 and 11	
2022	The Kindaichi Case Files	Akane Uryuu	Episodes 2 and 3	
2022	Tales of the Unusual: Summer 2022	Kanami Murano	Lead role; short drama	
2022	The Old Dog, New Tricks?	Rumi Itoyama		
2022	PICU: Pediatric Intensive Care Unit	Momoko Wakui		
2023	Turn To Me Mukai-kun	Miwako Todo		
2024	Unmet: A Neurosurgeon's Diary	Mai Nishijima		
2024	It's a Wonderful Teacher!	Rio Sasaoka	Lead role	
2026	The Scent of the Wind	Tae Tamada	Asadora	
2026	Zenigata Heiji	Oshizu	Television film	
2026	A Calm Sea and Beautiful Days with You	Fumiko Fukami	Season 2	

=== Films ===
Year	Title	Role	Notes	Ref(s)
2011	Beginning of Toire no Hanako-san	Hanako Hiiragi	under the name of Hanae Ikegami	
2014	Chōnōryoku Kenkyūbu no 3-nin	Ikuko Murata		
2017	Asahinagu	Nene Ichidō		
2022	The Confidence Man JP: Episode of the Hero	Rena Hatakeyama		
2022	Dr. Coto's Clinic 2022	Nami Nishino		
2022	Kaiketsu Zorori: La La La Sutā Tanjō	Hipopo	Voice role	
2025	Black Showman	Momoko Ikenaga		

=== Japanese dub ===
Year	Title	Role	Voice dub for	Notes	Ref(s)
2012	The Hunger Games	Rue	Amandla Stenberg	Theatrical version only	
2023	Once Upon a Studio	Asha	Ariana DeBose		
2023	Wish	Asha	Ariana DeBose		

=== Theater ===
Year	Title	Role	Venue	Notes	Ref(s)
2007	Coco Smile: Asu e no Rock 'n' Roll	Coco			
2009	Heidi	Clara Sesemann			
2014-2015	Rainbow Prelude	Louise	Tennōzu Ginga Theater		
2015	Princess Knight	Princess Sapphire	Akasaka ACT Theater		
2017-2019	Roméo et Juliette	Juliette	Akasaka ACT Theater	Shared with Haruka Kinoshita and Wakana Aoi.	
2017-2019	Les Misérables	Cosette	Imperial Theatre	Shared with Ayaka Shimizu, Mayuko Kominami and Iroha Kumagai.	
2018	Mozart!	Constanze	Imperial Theatre	Shared with Aya Hirano and Haruka Kinoshita. Won an award for her role in 44th Kazuo Kikuta Theatre Awards 2019.	
2019	Natasha, Pierre & The Great Comet of 1812	Natasha Rostova	Imperial Theatre	Won an award for her role in 44th Kazuo Kikuta Theatre Awards 2019.	
2019-2020	Beautiful Woman -A Woman Who Has Met With God-	Kegare			
2020	Whistle Down the Wind	Swallow	Imperial Theatre		
2021	Les Misérables	Éponine	Imperial Theatre	Shared with Fuka Yuduki and Tomona Yabiku.	
2022	Your Lie in April	Kaori Miyazono	Nissay Theatre		
2023	Mean Girls	Cady Heron			
2023	Gypsy	Louise			
2024-2025	Les Misérables	Fantine	Imperial Theatre	Shared with Natsumi Kon and Haruka Kinoshita.	
2025	King Lear	Cordelia			

=== Concerts ===
- 2017: MTV Unplugged: Erika Ikuta

== Bibliography ==
=== Photobooks ===
- Kikan Nogizaka vol.4 Saitō (26 December 2014, Tokyo News Service). ISBN 9784863364516.
- Tenchō=Modulation Erika Ikuta 1st Photo Book (21 January 2016, Shueisha). ISBN 9784087807783.
- Erika Ikuta Nogizaka46 Graduation Memorial Book: Kanon (14 December 2021, Kodansha). ISBN 9784065268551.
