= Mai Shiraishi =

Japanese actress, model, and YouTuber (born 1992)

- 白石 麻衣
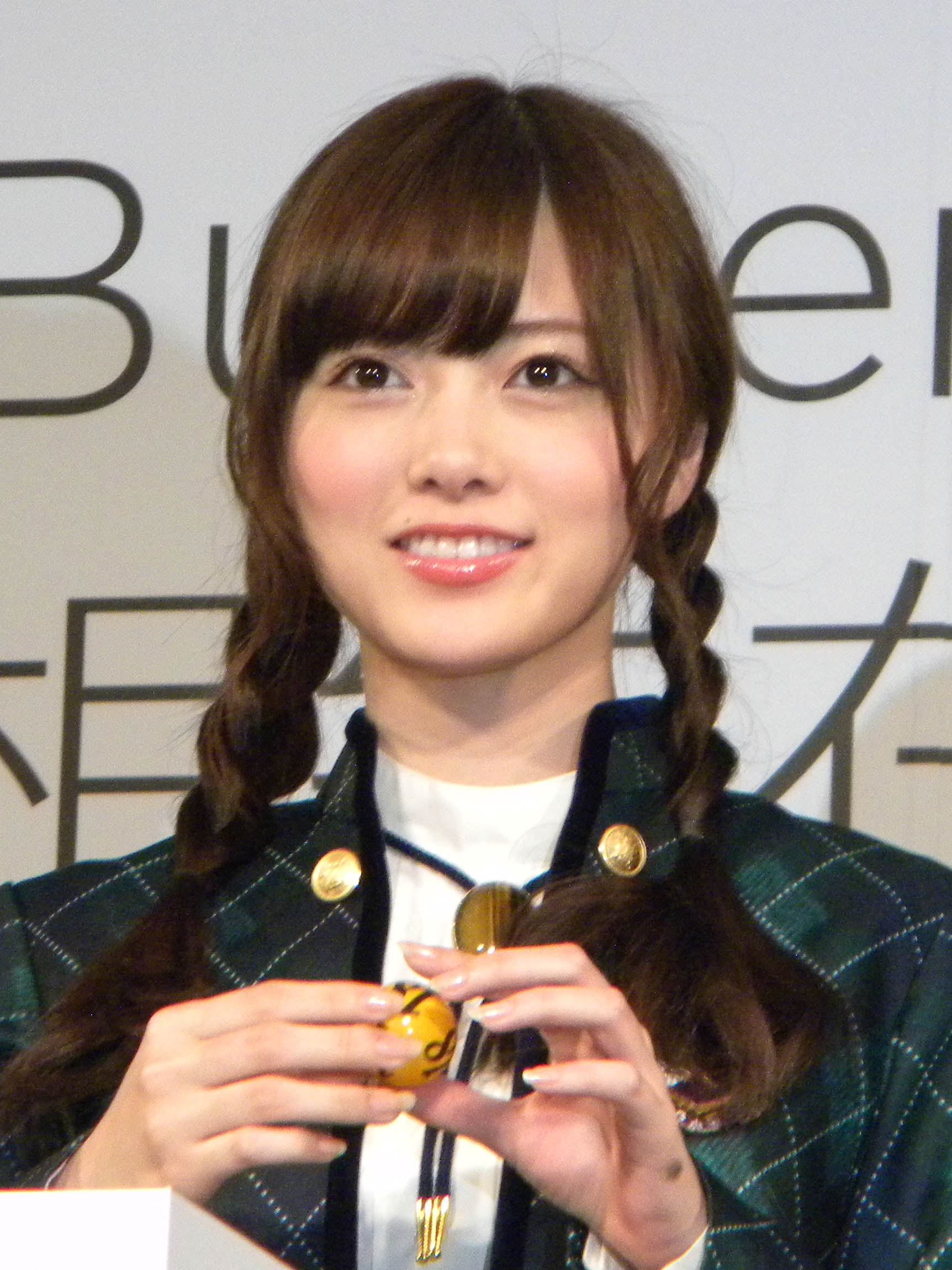
- Shiraishi in Taiwan in 2014
- Born: 20 August 1992 (age 34); Gunma, Japan
- Other name: Maiyan (まいやん)
- Occupations: Actress; model; YouTuber
- Years active: 2011–present
- Agent: Nogizaka46.LLC
- Height: 164 cm (5 ft 5 in)
- Musical career
- Genre: J-pop
- Instrument: Vocals
- Years active: 2011–2020
- Label: Sony Records/N46Div
- Formerly of: Nogizaka46

YouTube information
- Channel: my channel【白石麻衣 公式】
- Years active: 2020–present
- Genre: Vlog
- Subscribers: 1.35 million
- Views: 108 million
- Last updated: 27 October 2025
- Website: maishiraishi-official.com

Mai Shiraishi (白石 麻衣, Shiraishi Mai; born 20 August 1992) is a Japanese actress, model, YouTuber, and a former first generation member of the Japanese idol girl group Nogizaka46. She was an exclusive model for the women's fashion magazines LARME and Ray.

== Career ==
After graduating from high school, Shiraishi attended music college as she desired to be a singer. Later on, one of her teachers persuaded her to audition for Nogizaka46.

Shiraishi's singing career started when she was accepted as one of the first generation members of AKB48's official rival group, Nogizaka46, on 21 August 2011. She was chosen as one of the members performing on the group's debut single "Guruguru Curtain" on 22 February 2012. When Nogizaka46 released their second single "Oide Shampoo", she was once again chosen to perform. Her career as a model started when she participated in Girls Award 2012 Autumn/Winter alongside former Nogizaka46 bandmate Nanase Nishino.

Shiraishi achieved further popularity when she appeared on the 1 January 2013 episode of Count Down TV and the 16 March 2013 episode of Uma Zuki!. Shiraishi has been a permanent presenter on the latter since the 5 January 2013 episode and Bachi Bachi Elekiteru since the 16 April 2013 episode.

She became the youngest model for women's fashion magazine Ray, issued by Shufonotomo, since 23 March 2013.

Shiraishi was chosen as the center position in Nogizaka46 for their sixth single "Girl's Rule", released on 3 July 2013. She took over the center position from Rina Ikoma.

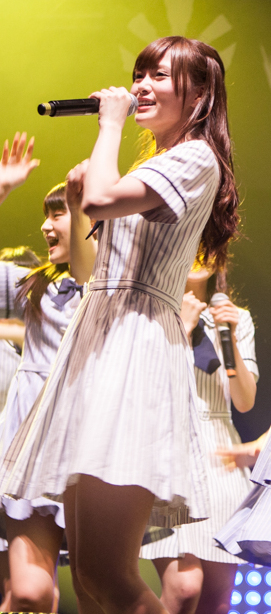
Shiraishi performing with Nogizaka46 at the Japan Expo held in Paris, France in 2014

On 17 December 2014, Shiraishi held an event for her first photo book, Seijun na Otona Shiraishi Mai. Shiraishi is the first Nogizaka46 member to publish a solo photo book. "I'm happy to be the first one," she said. Her second photobook, Mai Style, was published on January 23, 2015. It ranked fourth on the Oricon general book ranking and first in the photobook category selling 19,000 copies in the first week.

In September 2016, Shiraishi played a supporting role in the film Ushijima the Loan Shark 3.

On 7 February 2017, her third solo photo book, Passport, was published. It was reprinted twenty times, and the total printing volume exceeded 310,000 copies until June 2018. Moreover, in the first half of the year 2018, she made the highest number of appearances in television commercials among any other tarento in Japan.

Shiraishi was in charge of the center position for Nogizaka46's twentieth single "Synchronicity" which was released on 25 April 2018. It sold 1,116,852 copies in the first week.

On 9 January 2020, Shiraishi announced that she would graduate from Nogizaka46 after the release of their 25th single, "Shiawase no Hogoshoku", with a farewell performance during the group's Tokyo Dome concert scheduled in May. On 28 April, she announced that this has been postponed due to the COVID-19 pandemic. On 20 August, the performance date was rescheduled for 28 October and was a livestreamed event.

In August, Shiraishi launched her YouTube channel, called "My Channel" (stylized in all lowercase and a homophone of her given name). As of August 2021, it has reached 1.35 million subscribers.

== Discography ==
=== Singles with Nogizaka46 ===
| Year | No. | Title | Role | Notes |
|---|---|---|---|---|
| 2012 | 1 | "Guruguru Curtain" | A-side | Debut as 1st Generation member; Also sang on "Nogizaka no Uta", "Aitakatta Kamoshirenai", "Ushinaitakunai kara" and "Shiroi Kumo ni Notte" |
| 2012 | 2 | "Oide Shampoo" | A-side | Also sang on "Kokoro no Kusuri", "Gūzen o Iiwake ni Shite" and "House!" |
| 2012 | 3 | "Hashire! Bicycle" | A-side | Also sang on "Sekkachi na Katatsumuri", "Hito wa Naze Hashiru no ka" and "Oto ga Denai Guitar" |
| 2012 | 4 | "Seifuku no Mannequin" | A-side | Also sang on "Yubi Bōenkyō" and "Shibuya Blues" |
| 2013 | 5 | "Kimi no Na wa Kibō" | A-side | Also sang on "Shakiism", "Romantic Ikayaki", "Shiroi Kumo ni Notte" and "Dekopin" |
| 2013 | 6 | "Girl's Rule" | A-side, center | Also sang on "Sekai de Ichiban Kodoku na Lover", "Kōmori yo" and "Ningen to Iu Gakki" |
| 2013 | 7 | "Barrette" | A-side | Also sang on "Tsuki no Ōkisa", "Watashi no Tame ni, Dareka no Tame ni" and "Sonna Baka na…" |
| 2014 | 8 | "Kizuitara Kataomoi" | A-side | Also sang on "Romance no Start", "Toiki no Method" and "Kodoku Kyōdai" |
| 2014 | 9 | "Natsu no Free & Easy" | A-side | Also sang on "Nani mo Dekizu ni Soba ni Iru" and "Sono Saki no Deguchi" |
| 2014 | 10 | "Nandome no Aozora ka?" | A-side | Also sang on "Korogatta Kane o Narase!" and "Tender days" |
| 2015 | 11 | "Inochi wa Utsukushii" | A-side | Also sang on "Tachinaorichū" |
| 2015 | 12 | "Taiyō Nokku" | A-side | Also sang on "Sakanatachi no LOVE SONG" and "Hane no Kioku" |
| 2015 | 13 | "Ima, Hanashitai Dareka ga Iru" | A-side, center | Shared center position with Nanase Nishino; Also sang on "Popipappapā" and "Kanashimi no Wasurekata" |
| 2016 | 14 | "Harujion ga Sakukoro" | A-side | Also sang on "Kyūshamen" |
| 2016 | 15 | "Hadashi de Summer" | A-side | Also sang on "Boku Dake no Hikari" and "Offshore Girl" (solo) |
| 2016 | 16 | "Sayonara no Imi" | A-side | Also sang on "Kodoku na Aozora" |
| 2017 | 17 | "Influencer" | A-side, center | Shared center position with Nanase Nishino; Also sang on "Igai BREAK" |
| 2017 | 18 | "Nigemizu" | A-side | Also sang on "Onna wa Hitori ja Nemurenai", "Hito Natsu no Nagasa Yori…" and "Naitatte Iijanaika?" |
| 2017 | 19 | "Itsuka Dekiru kara Kyō Dekiru" | A-side | Also sang on "Fuminshō" and "Māiika?" |
| 2018 | 20 | "Synchronicity" | A-side, center | Also sang on "Against" as 1st Generation member |
| 2018 | 21 | "Jikochū de Ikō!" | A-side | Also sang on "Soratobira", "Kokoro no Monologue" and "Anna ni Sukidatta no ni…" |
| 2018 | 22 | "Kaerimichi wa Tōmawari Shitaku Naru" | A-side | Also sang on "Chopin no Usotsuki" |
| 2019 | 23 | "Sing Out!" | A-side | Also sang on "No Yōna Sonzai" |
| 2019 | 24 | "Yoake Made Tsuyogaranakutemoii" | A-side | Also sang on "Boku no Koto, Shitteru?" and "Boku no Omoikomi" |
| 2020 | 25 | "Shiawase no Hogoshoku" | A-side, center | Last single to participate; Also sang on "Jyāne." which was her graduation song. |
| 2020 | — | "Sekaijū no Rinjin yo" | — | Charity song during the COVID-19 pandemic |

=== Albums with Nogizaka46 ===
| Year | No. | Title | Participated song |
|---|---|---|---|
| 2015 | 1 | Tōmei na Iro | "Boku ga Iru Basho"; "Kakumei no Uma" |
| 2016 | 2 | Sorezore no Isu | "Kikkake"; "Taiyō ni Kudokarete"; "Kūkikan" |
| 2017 | 3 | Umarete Kara Hajimete Mita Yume | "Skydiving"; "Settei Ondo"; "Ryūsei Discotic" |
| 2019 | 4 | Ima ga Omoide ni Naru made | "Arigachi na Ren'ai"; "Hozue o Tsuite Nemurenai" |

=== Other featured songs ===
| Year | Artist | Title | Albums / Singles |
|---|---|---|---|
| 2012 | Mayu Watanabe | "Twin Tail wa Mō Shinai" | "Otona Jellybeans" |
| 2016 | AKB48 | "Mazariau Mono" | "Kimi wa Melody" |
| 2019 | AKB48 | "Hitsuzensei" | "Jiwaru Days" |

== Filmography ==
=== Television ===
| Year | Title | Role | Notes | Ref(s) |
|---|---|---|---|---|
| 2013–16 | Umazuki! | Herself | Presenter | |
| 2013 | Bachi Bachi Elekiteru | Herself | Presenter | |
| 2014 | Kamen Teacher | Akari Hayase | | |
| 2015 | Hatsumori Bemars | Kirei | | |
| 2015 | Burning Flower | | Taiga drama | |
| 2016 | True Horror Stories: Summer 2016 | | Short drama | |
| 2017 | Kyabasuka Gakuen | Herself | The final episode | |
| 2017–18 | UmazuKingdom | Herself | Presenter | |
| 2018 | Could Have Done It Committee | Ayako Tsuki | | |
| 2018 | Zettai Reido: season 3 | | Episode 8 | |
| 2019 | Where Have My Skirts Gone? | Moe Satomi | | |
| 2022 | Don't Call It Mystery | Anju Inudō | | |
| 2023 | Kazama Kimichika: Kyojo Zero | Michiko Kanera | | |
| 2024 | Okura: Cold Case Investigation | Rinko Yuki | | |

=== Films ===
| Year | Title | Role | Notes | Ref(s) |
|---|---|---|---|---|
| 2013 | Bad Boys J | Nao Masaki | | |
| 2016 | Ushijima the Loan Shark 3 | Rina Asō | | |
| 2017 | Asahinagu | Maharu Miyaji | | |
| 2020 | Stolen Identity 2 | Minori Matsuda | | |
| 2022 | Usogui: Lie Eater | Ranko Kurama | | |
| 2022 | Detective Conan: The Bride of Halloween | Erenika Lavrentyeva (voice) | | |
| 2023 | Zom 100: Bucket List of the Dead | Shizuka | | |
| 2024 | Saint Young Men: The Movie | Benzaiten | | |
| 2024 | Stolen Identity: Final Hacking Game | Minori Kagaya | | |
| 2025 | Under Ninja | Suzuki | | |
| 2026 | Kyojo: Reunion | Michiko Kanera | | |

=== Commercials ===
| Year | Product | Ref(s) |
|---|---|---|
| 2013 | Sony Music Distribution | |
| 2013 | L'est Rose | |
| 2013 | Samantha Thavasa | |
| 2015 | Dariya | |
| 2017 | Mouse Computer Japan | |
| 2017 | 77 Bank CM | |
| 2017 | Shiseido | |
| 2018 | Kagome | |
| 2018 | KIRIN | |

== Bibliography ==
=== Magazines ===
- Larme, Tokuma Shoten 2012-, as an exclusive model since 2012
- Ray, Shufunotomo 1988-, as an exclusive model since 2013

=== Photobooks ===
- Kikan Nogizaka vol.2 Shoka (Tokyo News Service, 12 June 2014), ISBN 9784863364097
- Seijun na Otona Shiraishi Mai (Gentosha, 10 December 2014), ISBN 9784344026711
- Mai Style (Shufunotomo, 23 January 2015), ISBN 9784074020980
- Passport (Kodansha, 7 February 2017), ISBN 9784063528572
