= Nanase Nishino =

Japanese actress and television host (born 1994)

- 西野 七瀬
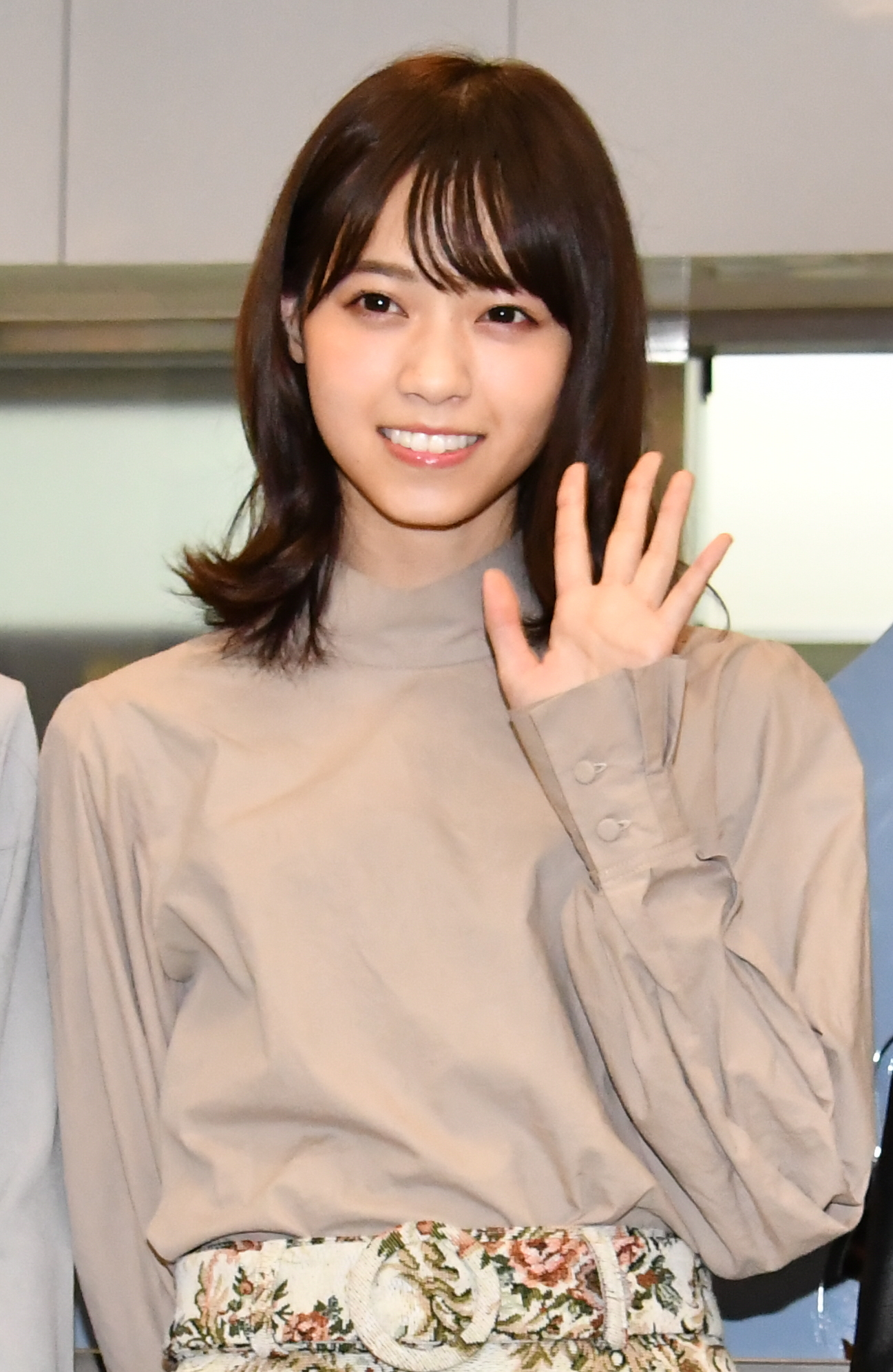
- Nishino in 2016
- Born: May 25, 1994 (age 32); Hirano-ku, Osaka, Osaka Prefecture, Japan
- Occupations: Actress; television host
- Years active: 2011–present
- Spouse: Yuki Yamada (m. 2024)
- Relatives: Taisei Nishino (older brother)
- Musical career
- Genre: J-pop
- Years active: 2011–2018
- Label: Sony Records/N46Div
- Formerly of: Nogizaka46
- Website: nishinonanase.com

Signature
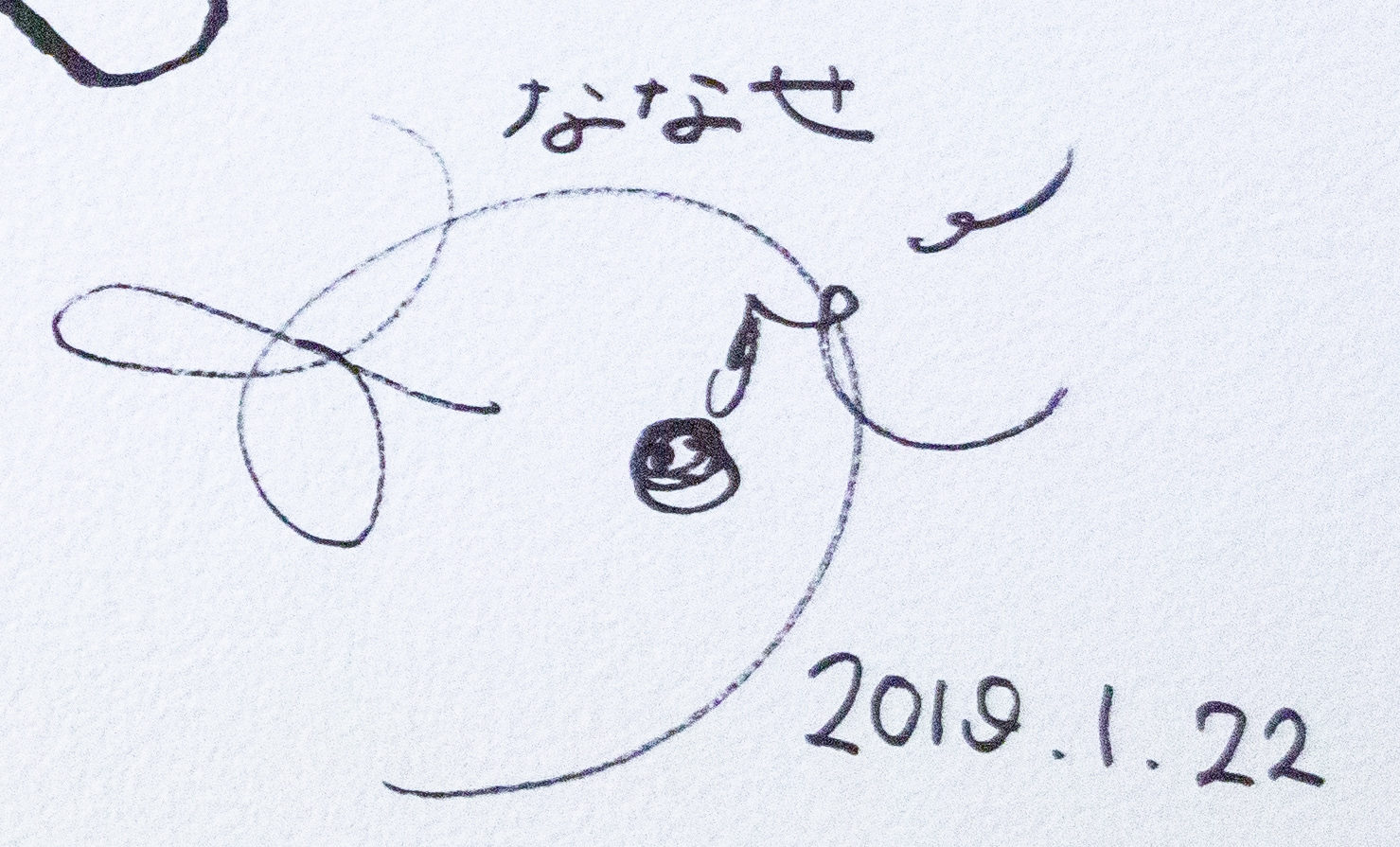

Nanase Nishino (西野 七瀬, Nishino Nanase; born May 25, 1994) is a Japanese actress, television host and former first generation member of Japanese idol girl group Nogizaka46. Her lead roles in TV and film have included Asahi Tōjima in Asahinagu and Ai Amano in Denei Shojo: Video Girl Ai 2018. She co-hosts the Fuji TV variety show Lion no Goo Touch.

== Biography ==
Nishino was born on May 25, 1994, in Hirano-ku, Osaka, Osaka Prefecture. She has one older brother, model and actor Taisei Nishino.

== Career ==
In 2011 Nishino auditioned for Nogizaka46 and was selected as one of the 36 first generation members. She was chosen as one of the members performing on their debut single "Guruguru Curtain", released on February 22, 2012. On November 8, 2012, Nishino made her model debut walking the runway at GirlsAward 2012 Autumn/Winter with Nogizaka46 bandmate Mai Shiraishi.

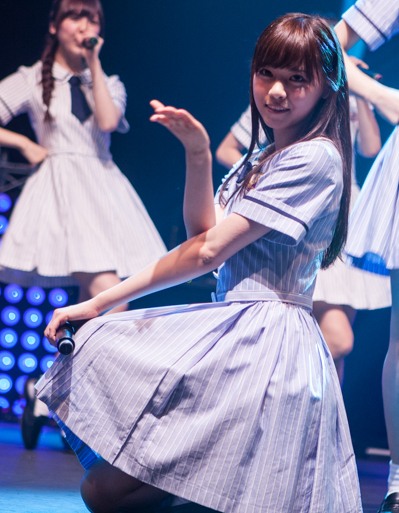
Nishino with Nogizaka46 at the Japan Expo held in Paris, France in 2014

She was selected as the choreographic center for the first time for Nogizaka46's 8th single "Kizuitara Kataomoi", which was released on April 2, 2014. Her first solo song, "Hitoriyogari" was included on Nogizaka46's debut album Tōmei na Iro, which was released on January 7, 2015. Nishino's first photo book, titled Fudangi (Everyday Clothes), was published on February 18, 2015. It sold 36,000 copies in a week and ranked 1st on the Oricon weekly sales chart in the photobook category. She was the second member from Nogizaka46 to release a photo book, after Shiraishi.

Nishino returned to the center position for the group's 11th single, "Inochi wa Utsukushii", which was released on March 18, 2015. The single also included her second solo song, titled "Gomenne Zutto..." as a B-side. She appeared in the fashion magazine non-no as an exclusive model starting with the June 2015 issue. In July 2015 she played the lead role in the Nogizaka46 TV softball drama Hatsumori Bemars. On August 30, 2015, Nishino and Shiraishi were selected as Nogizaka46's first double center for their thirteenth single "Ima, Hanashitai Dareka ga Iru".

On March 7, 2016, Nishino was announced as the co-host of the Fuji TV variety show Lion no Goo Touch. Her 2nd photo book, Kaze o Kigaete, was published on September 29, 2016. The included photos were taken in Malta and Italy over 5 days. Kaze o Kigaete ranked first on the Oricon book ranking in the photobook category for two consecutive weeks. On September 22, 2017, the film adaptation of the naginata manga Asahinagu was released, with Nishino playing the starring role of Asahi Tōjima.

On September 20, 2018, Nishino announced her graduation from Nogizaka46 on the group's official blog. Her first post-Nogizaka46 acting role was as Yōko Matsuda in the 2019 TV Tokyo series Bet on This Girl! A supporting role in the NTV series Your Turn to Kill followed later that year.

== Personal life ==
Within the industry she is friends with actress Marie Iitoyo and fellow former bandmate turned-writer Kazumi Takayama.

=== Marriage ===
On March 31, 2024, Nishino announced her marriage to actor Yuki Yamada.

== Discography ==
=== Singles with Nogizaka46 ===
Year	No.	Title	Role	Notes
2012	1	"Guruguru Curtain"	A-side	Debut as 1st Generation member; Also sang on "Nogizaka no Uta", "Aitakatta Kamoshirenai", "Ushinaitakunai kara" and "Shiroi Kumo ni Notte"
2012	2	"Oide Shampoo"	A-side	Also sang on "Kokoro no Kusuri" and "House!"
2012	3	"Hashire! Bicycle"	A-side	Also sang on "Sekkachi na Katatsumuri", "Hito wa Naze Hashiru no ka" and "Oto ga Denai Guitar"
2012	4	"Seifuku no Mannequin"	A-side	Also sang on "Yubi Bōenkyō" and "Yasashisa Nara Ma ni Atteru"
2013	5	"Kimi no Na wa Kibō"	A-side	Also sang on "Shakiism", "Romantic Ikayaki" and "Psychokinesis no Kanosei"
2013	6	"Girl's Rule"	A-side	Also sang on "Sekai de Ichiban Kodoku na Lover", "Hoka no Hoshi Kara" and "Ningen to Iu Gakki"
2013	7	"Barrette"	A-side	Also sang on "Tsuki no Ōkisa", "Sonna Baka na…" and "Yasashisa to wa"
2014	8	"Kizuitara Kataomoi"	A-side, center	Also sang on "Romance no Start", "Toiki no Method" and "Dankeschön"
2014	9	"Natsu no Free & Easy"	A-side, center	Also sang on "Nani mo Dekizu ni Soba ni Iru", "Mukuchi na Lion" and "Boku ga Ikanakya Dare ga Ikunda?"
2014	10	"Nandome no Aozora ka?"	A-side	Also sang on "Tōmawari no Aijō", "Korogatta Kane o Narase!" and "Tender days"
2015	11	"Inochi wa Utsukushii"	A-side, center	Also sang on "Gomen ne Zutto…" (solo)
2015	12	"Taiyō Nokku"	A-side	Also sang on "Mō Sukoshi no Yume" (solo) and "Hane no Kioku"
2015	13	"Ima, Hanashitai Dareka ga Iru"	A-side, center	Shared center position with Mai Shiraishi; Also sang on "Popipappapā", "Kanashimi no Wasurekata" and "Sukima"
2016	14	"Harujion ga Sakukoro"	A-side	Also sang on "Tsuribori" (solo)
2016	15	"Hadashi de Summer"	A-side	Also sang on "Boku Dake no Hikari"
2016	16	"Sayonara no Imi"	A-side	Also sang on "Kodoku na Aozora"
2017	17	"Influencer"	A-side, center	Shared center position with Mai Shiraishi; Also sang on "Another Ghost"
2017	18	"Nigemizu"	A-side	Also sang on "Onna wa Hitori ja Nemurenai", "Hito Natsu no Nagasa Yori…" and "Naitatte Iijanaika?"
2017	19	"Itsuka Dekiru kara Kyō Dekiru"	A-side, center	Shared center position with Asuka Saitō; Also sang on "Fuminshō"
2018	20	"Synchronicity"	A-side	Also sang on "Against" as 1st Generation member
2018	21	"Jikochū de Ikō!"	A-side	Also sang on "Soratobira", "Kokoro no Monologue" and "Anna ni Sukidatta no ni…"
2018	22	"Kaerimichi wa Tōmawari Shitaku Naru"	A-side, center	Last single to participate; Also sang on "Tsuzuku" which was her graduation song.
2020	—	"Sekaijū no Rinjin yo"	—	Charity song during the COVID-19 pandemic

=== Albums with Nogizaka46 ===
Year	No.	Title	Participated song
2015	1	Tōmei na Iro	"Boku ga Iru Basho"; "Hitori Yogari" (solo)
2016	2	Sorezore no Isu	"Kikkake"; "Taiyō ni Kudokarete"; "Kōgōsei Kibō"
2017	3	Umarete Kara Hajimete Mita Yume	"Skydiving"; "Settei Ondo"; "Rewind Ano Hi"

=== Other featured songs ===
Year	Artist	Title	Albums / Singles
2012	Mayu Watanabe	"Twin Tail wa Mō Shinai"	"Otona Jellybeans"
2016	AKB48	"Mazariau Mono"	"Kimi wa Melody"
2019	AKB48	"Hitsuzensei"	"Jiwaru Days"

== Filmography ==
=== Films ===
Year	Title	Role	Notes	Ref(s)
2016	One Piece Film: Gold	Alba	Voice role	
2017	Asahinagu	Asahi Tojima	Lead role	
2019	Coluboccoro	Suzu	Voice role	
2020	Not Quite Dead Yet			
2021	Last of the Wolves	Mao Chikada		
2021	Every Trick in the Book	Numoto		
2021	Your Turn to Kill: The Movie	Sawa Kuroshima		
2022	xxxHolic	Nekomusume		
2022	Love Is Light	Kitashiro		
2023	Ichikei's Crow: The Movie	Kimiko Akagi		
2023	Shin Kamen Rider	Hiromi / Hachi Augment-01		
2024	In an Isolated Cottage on a Snowy Mountain	Yurie Motomura		
2024	52-Hertz Whales	Kotomi Shinagi		
2024	Dangerous Cops: Home Coming	Rika Hayase		
2024	Trapezium	Old man	Voice cameo	
2025	How to Forget You	Miki		
2025	The Boy and the Dog	Miwa Sugai	Lead role	
2026	90 Meters	Kaori Shimomura		
2026	Goodbye My Car	Mai Kawana		
2026	Cry Out	Future Akiko	Voice role	
2026	Bad Lieutenant: Tokyo		American-Japanese film	
2027	Akiramemasen!	Rimi Kirishima		

=== Television ===
Year	Title	Role	Notes	Ref(s)
2012	Nogizaka Romance	Herself		
2013	49	Mana Minazuki		
2015	Tenshi no Knife	Cafe worker		
2015	Hatsumori Bemars	Nanamaru	Lead role	
2015	Burning Flower		Taiga drama	
2016	Honto ni Atta Kowai Hanashi Natsu no Tokubetsu-hen 2016		One episode	
2016	Kyabasuka Gakuen	Nogi Female Student	One episode	
2018	Denei Shojo: Video Girl Ai 2018	Ai Amano	Lead role	
2019	Bet on This Girl!	Yoko Matsuda		
2019	Your Turn to Kill	Sawa Kuroshima		
2020	Unsung Cinderella	Kurumi Aihara		
2021	Police in a Pod	Miwa Makitaka		
2021	The Words They Speak	Kotoha Utagawa	Lead role	
2022	Who Needs True Love?	Kyoko Kiyomiya		
2022	Shylock's Children	Airi Kitagawa		
2023	Ichigeki	Sono & Chiyo	Television film	
2023	Dr. Chocolate	Nagisa Okuzumi		
2023	0.5 No Otoko	Hitomi		
2023	Dokotonaku Nantonaku	Wife of Tenchi		
2023	Pocket Filled With Adventure	Madoka Akagi	Lead role	
2023	Tales of the Unusual 2023 Spring SP	Inori Koshimizu	Lead role	
2024	Ōoku	Oshina		

=== Web series ===
Year	Title	Role	Platform	Ref(s)
2016	Uchu no Shigoto	Kaori	Amazon Prime Video	
2021	Hot Mum	Natsuki Matsuura	Amazon Prime Video	
2023	Regards To Kenshiro	Rika Sakamoto	DMM TV	
2024	1122: For a Happy Marriage	Mizuki Kashiwagi	Amazon Prime Video	

=== Commercials ===
Year	Product	Ref(s)
2015–2016	Pizza Hut	
2016	SoftBank	
2016	Mouse Computer Japan	
2017	Jalan	
2017	Bourbon Fettuccine Fruits	
2017	77 Bank CM	
2018	Biore UV Essence	
2019	Black Desert Online Mobile Japan	
2019	KAO Success24	
2019	me me mar	
2019	Cashless Point Return Business (Ministry of Economy, Trade and Industry)	
2019	Year-End Jumbo Lottery	
2020	The 96th Hakone Ekiden New Year special version (Sapporo Breweries)	
2020	Mercari	
2020	KAO Success24	
2020	Qol Pharmacy	
2020	Asahi The Rich (Asahi Breweries)	
2021	Asahi Super Dry (Asahi Breweries)	
2021	au (KDDI)	
2021	SUUMO (Recruit)	
2021	KAO Success24	
2021	Tod's Friend (Tod's)	
2021	Platinum Woman brand ambassador (Platinum Guild International)	
2022	Asahi Super Dry (Asahi Breweries)	
2022	au (KDDI)	
2022	Japanese Black Tea sugar-free straight (Asahi Soft Drinks)	
2023	Asahi Super Dry (Asahi Breweries)	
2023	Asian Burgers (McDonald's Company Japan)	
2023	The Super Mario Bros. Movie ambassador (Illumination / Nintendo)	
2023	Japanese Black Tea sugar-free straight (Asahi Soft Drinks)	
2023	au (KDDI)	
2024	Horoyoi (Suntory)	
2025	PS5 x Monster Hunter Wilds	
2025	au (KDDI)	
2025	graniph	
2025	PlayStation × YOASOBI「PLAYERS」30th anniversary	
2025	Horoyoi (Suntory)	

== Bibliography ==
=== Magazines ===
- Up to Boy +, Wani Books 1979-, since October 2014
- Non-no, Shueisha 1971-, as an exclusive model since the June 2015 issue

=== Photobooks ===
- Kikan Nogizaka vol.1 Sōshun (March 5, 2014, Tokyo News Service) ISBN 9784863363878
- Fudangi (February 18, 2015, Gentosha) ISBN 9784344027091
- Kaze o Kigaete (September 27, 2016, Shūeisha) ISBN 9784087807981
- Watashi no Koto (May 9, 2018, Shueisha) ISBN 9784087808377

== Awards and nominations ==
Year presented, name of the award ceremony, category, nominee(s) of the award, and the result of the nomination
Year	Award ceremony	Category	Nominated work(s)	Result	Ref.
2017	42nd Hochi Film Awards	Best New Artist	Asahinagu	Nominated	
2021	46th Hochi Film Awards	Best Supporting Actress	Last of the Wolves	Nominated	
2022	45th Japan Academy Film Prize	Best Supporting Actress	Last of the Wolves	Nominated	
2022	45th Japan Academy Film Prize	Newcomer of the Year	Last of the Wolves	Won	
2022	35th Nikkan Sports Film Awards	Best Newcomer	Love Is Light and xxxHolic	Nominated	
2023	44th Yokohama Film Festival	Best Newcomer	Love Is Light	Won	
