= List of Oricon number-one singles of 2015 =

The highest-selling singles in Japan are ranked in the weekly Oricon Singles Chart, which is published by Oricon Style magazine. The data are compiled by Oricon based on each singles' weekly physical sales. This list includes the singles that reached the number one place on that chart in 2015.

== Chart history ==
Issue date	Song	Artist(s)	Ref.
January 5	"Thank You Jan!"	Kis-My-Ft2	
January 12	"Genkidane"	Kamen Joshi	
January 19	"Kaguya"	NEWS	
January 26	"Uchōten"	B'z	
February 2	"Dead or Alive"	KAT-TUN	
February 9	"Guilty Love"	2PM	
February 16	"Zundoko Paradise"	Johnny's West	
February 23	"Kioku / Kokoro Odoreba"	Subaru Shibutani	
March 2	"Karei Naru Gyakushu / Humor Sichau yo"	SMAP	
March 9	"Sakura"	Arashi	
March 16	"Green Flash"	AKB48	
March 23	"Kiss Kiss Kiss"	KAT-TUN	
March 30	"Inochi wa Utsukushii"	Nogizaka46	
April 6	"Kiss Damashii"	Kis-My-Ft2	
April 13	"Coquettish Jūtai Chū"	SKE48	
April 20	"Wonderful World / Ça va? Ça va?"	Juice=Juice	
April 27	"Starting Over"	Sandaime J Soul Brothers	
May 4	"12 Byō"	HKT48	
May 11	"Chau/I Need You"	Hey! Say! JUMP	
May 18	"Timeless"	V6	
May 25	"Aozora no Shita, Kimi no Tonari"	Arashi	
June 1	"Bokutachi wa Tatakawanai"	AKB48	
June 8	"Bokutachi wa Tatakawanai"	AKB48	
June 15	"Tsuyoku Tsuyoku Tsuyoku"	Kanjani Eight	
June 22	"Red"	B'z	
June 29	"For You"	BTS	
July 6	"Chumu Chumu"	NEWS	
July 13	"Cha Cha Cha"	Sexy Zone	
July 20	"Summer Madness"	Sandaime J Soul Brothers featuring Afrojack	
July 27	"Dorian Shōnen"	NMB48	
August 3	"Taiyō Nokku"	Nogizaka46	
August 10	"Bari Hapi"	Johnny's West	
August 17	"Maemuki Scream!"	Kanjani Eight	
August 24	"Mae Nomeri"	SKE48	
August 31	"I am a HERO"	Masaharu Fukuyama	
September 7	"Halloween Night"	AKB48	
September 14	"Ai o Sakebe"	Arashi	
September 21	"Otherside / Ai ga Tomaru Made wa"	SMAP	
September 28	"All For You"	Generations from Exile Tribe	
October 5	"SOS / Present"	Sekai no Owari	
October 12	"Moonlight Walker"	A.B.C-Z	
October 19	"Must Be Now"	NMB48	
October 26	"AAO"	Kis-My-Ft2	
November 2	"Kimi Attraction"	Hey! Say! JUMP	
November 9	"Ima, Hanashitai Dareka ga Iru"	Nogizaka46	
November 16	"Love Me Right (Romantic Universe)"	Exo	
November 23	"Saigo mo Yappari Kimi"	Kis-My-Ft2	
November 30	"Yume wo Mireba Kizutsuku Kotomo Aru"	Kinki Kids	
December 7	"Shekarashika!"	HKT48 ft.Kishidan	
December 14	"Samurai Song"	Kanjani Eight	
December 21	"Kuchibiru ni Be My Baby"	AKB48	
December 28	"Colorful Eyes"	Sexy Zone	

== See also ==
- 2015 in Japanese music
