= Your Turn to Kill =

- Created by: Yasushi Akimoto
- Screenplay by: Mitsunori Fukuhara
- Directed by: Noriyoshi Sakuma and others
- Starring: Tomoyo Harada; Kei Tanaka; Nanase Nishino; Ryusei Yokohama
- Narrated by: Tomoyo Harada; Kei Tanaka
- Composers: Yuki Hayashi; Asami Tachibana
- Country of origin: Japan
- Original language: Japanese
- No. of seasons: 1
- No. of episodes: 20

Production
- Producers: Hiroe Suzuma; Masanori Matsuyama
- Running time: 55 minutes
- Production company: AX-ON (Nippon TV)

Original release
- Network: NTV
- Release: April 14 – September 8, 2019

"Your Turn to Kill" (Japanese: あなたの番です, Hepburn: Anata no Ban desu; lit. "It's Your Turn") is a Japanese TV drama series. It was created by NTV and broadcast on the NNS on "Sunday Drama" every Sunday from April 14 to September 8, 2019 at 22:30-23:25 (JST). The abbreviation is "Anaban".

"Your Turn to Kill: The Movie" (Japanese: あなたの番です 劇場版, Hepburn: Anata no Ban desu Gekijoban) has been released since December 10, 2021.

== Cast ==
- Tomoyo Harada as Nana Tezuka
- Kei Tanaka as Shōta Tezuka
- Nanase Nishino as Sawa Kuroshima
- Ryusei Yokohama as Shinobu Nikaidō
- Tetsushi Tanaka as Masakazu Minami
- Naoto Takenaka as Hiroshi Tokoshima
- Tae Kimura as Sanae Enomoto
- Katsuhisa Namase as Jun'ichirō Tamiya
- Nao as Mikiha Ono
- Masanobu Ando as Gō Sano
- Yoshihiko Hakamada as Yuzuru Kuzumi
- Miwako Kakei as Ruri Sakuragi
- Yoji Tanaka as Keisuke Ukita
- Jin Katagiri as Atsushi Fujii
- Sōkō Wada as Jun Nishimura
- Tōru Nomaguchi as Asao Hosokawa
- Towa Araki as Sōichi Enomoto
- Kōdai Asaka as detective Masato Kamiya
- Sarutoki Minagawa as detective Yōji Mizuki
