= Kaguya (song) =

- Cover

Single by News
- Released: January 7, 2015

News singles chronology
"ONE -for the win-" (2014)	"Kaguya" (2015)

"Kaguya" (styled in all caps) is a single by Japanese boy band News. It was released on January 7, 2015. It debuted at number one on the weekly Oricon Singles Chart, with 140,000 copies. It also reached number one on the Billboard Japan Hot 100.
