= Mae Nomeri =

- Cover

Single by SKE48
- Released: August 12, 2015 (Japan)
- Label: Avex Trax
- Songwriters: Yasushi Akimoto, Katsuhiko Sugiyama

SKE48 singles chronology
"Coquettish Jūtai Chū" (2015)	"Mae Nomeri" (2015)	"Chicken Line" (2016)

Music video
- Mae Nomeri (Short ver.)

Music video
- Watch the Full MV on Dailymotion

"Mae Nomeri" (前のめり; Enthusiastic) is the 18th single by Japanese idol girl group SKE48. It was released on August 12, 2015. It was number-one on the Oricon Weekly Singles Chart with 370,135 copies sold. It was the fourteenth best-selling single of 2015 in Japan according to the Oricon Yearly Singles Chart, with 459,769 copies sold. As of January 25, 2016 it had sold 461,604 copies. It was also number-one on the Billboard Japan Hot 100.

This single marks the last appearance of Rena Matsui, which is center of the main track, and also sang "2588 Nichi", her graduation song (Full audio published on YouTube). Only short versions from their music videos are featured on YouTube, and full versions are included only on limited editions.

== Track listing ==
=== Type-A ===
CD
No.	Title	Artist(s)	Length
1.	"Mae Nomeri" (前のめり)
2.	"Suteki na Zaiakukan" (素敵な罪悪感)	Team S
3.	"Seifuku o Kita Meitantei" (制服を着た名探偵)	Dreaming Girls
4.	"Mae Nomeri (Off vocal)"
5.	"Suteki na Zaiakukan (Off vocal)"
6.	"Seifuku o Kita Meitantei (Off vocal)"

DVD
No.	Title	Length
1.	"Mae Nomeri (Music Video)"
2.	"Suteki na Zaiakukan (Music Video)"
3.	"Bonus Footage "Shinsedai no Yakudō: Documentary of SKE48 7th Kenkyūsei""

=== Type-B ===
CD
No.	Title	Artist(s)	Length
1.	"Mae Nomeri" (前のめり)
2.	"Shōsō ga Kono Boku o Dame ni Suru" (焦燥がこの僕をだめにする)	Team KII
3.	"Seifuku o Kita Meitantei" (制服を着た名探偵)	Dreaming Girls
4.	"Mae Nomeri (Off vocal)"
5.	"Shōsō ga Kono Boku o Dame ni Suru (Off vocal)"
6.	"Seifuku o Kita Meitantei (Off vocal)"

DVD
No.	Title	Length
1.	"Mae Nomeri (Music Video)"
2.	"Shōsō ga Kono Boku o Dame ni Suru (Music Video)"
3.	"Bonus Footage "Mirai e no Joshō: Documentary of SKE48 Draft 2nd generation""

=== Type-C ===
CD
No.	Title	Artist(s)	Length
1.	"Mae Nomeri" (前のめり)
2.	"Nagai Yume no Labyrinth" (長い夢のラビリンス)	Team E
3.	"Seifuku o Kita Meitantei" (制服を着た名探偵)	Dreaming Girls
4.	"Mae Nomeri (Off vocal)"
5.	"Nagai Yume no Labyrinth (Off vocal)"
6.	"Seifuku o Kita Meitantei (Off vocal)"

DVD
No.	Title	Length
1.	"Mae Nomeri (Music Video)"
2.	"Nagai Yume no Labyrinth (Music Video)"
3.	"Bonus Footage "2588 days. Documentary of Rena Matsui (first part)""

=== Type-D ===
CD
No.	Title	Artist(s)	Length
1.	"Mae Nomeri" (前のめり)
2.	"2588-nichi" (2588日)	Rena Matsui
3.	"Seifuku o Kita Meitantei" (制服を着た名探偵)	Dreaming Girls
4.	"Mae Nomeri (Off vocal)"
5.	"2588-nichi (Off vocal)"
6.	"Seifuku o Kita Meitantei (Off vocal)"

DVD
No.	Title	Length
1.	"Mae Nomeri (Music Video)"
2.	"2588-nichi (Music Video)"
3.	"Bonus Footage "2588 days. Documentary of Rena Matsui (last part)""

=== Theater Edition ===
CD
No.	Title	Artist(s)	Length
1.	"Mae Nomeri" (前のめり)
2.	"Seifuku o Kita Meitantei" (制服を着た名探偵)	Dreaming Girls
3.	"SKE48 18th Single Medley"
4.	"Mae Nomeri (Off vocal)"
5.	"Seifuku o Kita Meitantei (Off vocal)"

== Charts ==
Chart (2015)	Peak position
Japan (Oricon Weekly Singles Chart)	1
Japan (Billboard Japan Hot 100)	1

=== Year-end charts ===
Chart (2015)	Peak position
Japan (Oricon Yearly Singles Chart)	14
