= Itsuka Dekiru kara Kyō Dekiru =

2017 single by Nogizaka46

- Cover of the Regular edition.

Single by Nogizaka46

from the album Ima ga Omoide ni Naru made
- B-side: "Fuminshō"; "Māiika?" (Type-A); "Sitsuren Osojinin" (Type-B); "My rule" (Type-C); "Boku no Shōdō" (Type-D); "Atarashii Kafun: Musical「Mishiranu Sekai」Yori" (Regular)
- Released: 11 October 2017 (Japan)
- Genre: J-pop
- Label: N46Div.
- Producer: Yasushi Akimoto

Nogizaka46 singles chronology
"Nigemizu" (2017)	"Itsuka Dekiru kara Kyō Dekiru" (2017)	"Synchronicity" (2018)

Music video
- "Itsuka Dekiru kara Kyō Dekiru" on YouTube

"Itsuka Dekiru kara Kyō Dekiru" (Japanese: いつかできるから今日できる; "You can do it someday, so you can do it today") is the 19th single by Japanese idol girl group Nogizaka46. The center position of the title track is held by Asuka Saito and Nanase Nishino. It was released on 11 October 2017. It reached number-one on the weekly Oricon Singles Chart with 851,000 copies sold. It was also number-one on the Billboard Japan Hot 100.

== Release ==
This single was released in 5 versions. Type-A, Type-B, Type-C, Type-D and a regular edition.

== Track listing ==
All lyrics written by Yasushi Akimoto.

=== Type-A ===
CD
No.	Title	Length
1.	"Itsuka Dekiru kara Kyō Dekiru" (いつかできるから今日できる)
2.	"Fuminshō" (不眠症)
3.	"Māiika?" (まあいいか?)
4.	"Itsuka Dekiru kara Kyō Dekiru -off vocal ver.-"
5.	"Fuminshō -off vocal ver.-"
6.	"Māiika? off vocal ver.-"

=== Type-B ===
CD
No.	Title	Length
1.	"Itsuka Dekiru kara Kyō Dekiru"
2.	"Fuminshō"
3.	"Sitsuren Osojinin" (失恋お掃除人)
4.	"Itsuka Dekiru kara Kyō Dekiru -off vocal ver.-"
5.	"Fuminshō -off vocal ver.-"
6.	"Sitsuren Osojinin -off vocal ver.-"

=== Type-C ===
CD
No.	Title	Length
1.	"Itsuka Dekiru kara Kyō Dekiru"
2.	"Fuminshō"
3.	"My rule"
4.	"Itsuka Dekiru kara Kyō Dekiru -off vocal ver.-"
5.	"Fuminshō -off vocal ver.-"
6.	"My rule -off vocal ver.-"

=== Type-D ===
CD
No.	Title	Length
1.	"Itsuka Dekiru kara Kyō Dekiru"
2.	"Fuminshō"
3.	"Boku no Shōdō" (僕の衝動)
4.	"Itsuka Dekiru kara Kyō Dekiru -off vocal ver.-"
5.	"Fuminshō -off vocal ver.-"
6.	"Boku no Shōdō -off vocal ver.-"

=== Regular Edition ===
No.	Title	Length
1.	"Itsuka Dekiru kara Kyō Dekiru"
2.	"Fuminshō"
3.	"Atarashii Kafun: Musical "Mishiranu Sekai" Yori" (新しい花粉 ～ミュージカル「見知らぬ世界」より～)
4.	"Itsuka Dekiru kara Kyō Dekiru -off vocal ver.-"
5.	"Fuminshō -off vocal ver.-"
6.	"Atarashii Kafun: Musical "Mishiranu Sekai" Yori -off vocal ver.-"

== Participating members ==
=== "Itsuka Dekiru kara Kyō Dekiru" ===
- Center: Asuka Saitō and Nanase Nishino

3rd Row: Mai Shinuchi, Yuri Saitō, Minami Hoshino, Rina Ikoma, Manatsu Akimoto, Hinako Kitano, Kana Nakada, Kazumi Takayama

2nd Row: Yumi Wakatsuki, Sayuri Inoue, Sayuri Matsumura, Erika Ikuta, Marika Itō, Reika Sakurai, Misa Etō

1st Row: Miona Hori, Nanase Nishino, Asuka Saitō, Mai Shiraishi

== Chart performance ==
=== Weekly ===
==== Oricon ====
Chart	Peak	Debut Sales	Sales Total
Singles Chart	1	851,000	

==== Billboard Japan ====
Chart	Peak
Japan Hot 100	1

=== Yearly ===
==== Billboard Japan ====
Chart	Peak
Japan Hot 100	16
