= Harujion ga Sakukoro =

2016 single by Nogizaka46

- Cover of Type-A edition.

Single by Nogizaka46

from the album Sorezore no Isu
- B-side: "Harukanaru Bhutan"; "Tsuyogaru Tsubomi" (Type-A); "Kyuusyamen" (Type-B); "Tsuribori" (Type-C); "Futougou" (Type-D); "Yūutsu to Fūsen Gum" (Regular)
- Released: March 23, 2016 (Japan)
- Genre: J-pop
- Label: N46Div.
- Producer: Yasushi Akimoto

Nogizaka46 singles chronology
"Ima, Hanashitai Dareka ga Iru" (2015)	"Harujion ga Sakukoro" (2016)	"'Hadashi de Summer'" (2016)

"Harujion ga Sakukoro" (Japanese: ハルジオンが咲く頃; "The time when Philadelphia fleabane blooms") is the 14th single by Japanese idol girl group Nogizaka46. It was released on March 23, 2016. It was number-one on the weekly Oricon Singles Chart, with 749,706 copies sold. It was also number-one on the Billboard Japan Hot 100.

== Release ==
This single was released in 5 versions. Type-A, Type-B, Type-C, Type-D and a regular edition. The center position in the choreography for the title song is held by Mai Fukagawa. This is her first time as a center performer, and it is also her final single with Nogizaka46.

== Track listing ==
All lyrics written by Yasushi Akimoto.

=== Regular Edition ===
CD
No.	Title	Length
1.	"Harujion ga Sakukoro" (ハルジオンが咲く頃)	5:29
2.	"Harukanaru Bhutan" (遥かなるブータン)	4:38
3.	"Yūutsu to Fūsen Gum" (憂鬱と風船ガム)	4:04
4.	"Harujion ga Sakukoro～off vocal ver.～" (ハルジオンが咲く頃 -off vocal ver.-)	5:29
5.	"Harukanaru Bhutan～off vocal ver.～" (遥かなるブータン -off vocal ver.-)	4:38
6.	"Yūutsu to Fūsen Gum～off vocal ver.～" (憂鬱と風船ガム -off vocal ver.-)	4:03

=== Type-A ===
CD
No.	Title	Length
1.	"Harujion ga Saku Koro" (ハルジオンが咲く頃)	5:29
2.	"Harukanaru Bhutan" (遥かなるブータン)	4:38
3.	"Tsuyogaru Tsubomi" (強がる蕾)	4:46
4.	"Harujion ga Saku Koro～off vocal ver.～" (ハルジオンが咲く頃 -off vocal ver.-)	5:29
5.	"Harukanaru Bhutan～off vocal ver.～" (遥かなるブータン -off vocal ver.-)	4:38
6.	"Tsuyogaru Tsubomi～off vocal ver.～" (強がる蕾 -off vocal ver.-)	4:45

DVD
No.	Title	Length
1.	"Harujion ga Saku Koro Music Video"
2.	"Tsuyogaru Tsubomi Music Video"
3.	"Mai Fukagawa Documentary: Eien wa Nai Kara (There is no eternity)"

=== Type-B ===
CD
No.	Title	Length
1.	"Harujion ga Saku Koro" (ハルジオンが咲く頃)	5:29
2.	"Harukanaru Bhutan" (遥かなるブータン)	4:38
3.	"Kyuusyamen" (急斜面)	3:46
4.	"Harujion ga Saku Koro～off vocal ver.～" (ハルジオンが咲く頃 -off vocal ver.-)	5:29
5.	"Harukanaru Bhutan～off vocal ver.～" (遥かなるブータン -off vocal ver.-)	4:38
6.	"Kyuusyamen～off vocal ver.～" (急斜面 -off vocal ver.-)	3:45

DVD
No.	Title	Length
1.	"Harujion ga Saku Koro Music Video"
2.	"Kyuusyamen Music Video"
3.	"Manatsu Akimoto"
4.	"Karin Itō"
5.	"Junna Itō"
6.	"Hinako Kitano"
7.	"Asuka Saitō"
8.	"Iori Sagara"
9.	"Reika Sakurai"
10.	"Mai Shinuchi"
11.	"Kazumi Takayama"
12.	"Himeka Nakamoto"
13.	"Nanase Nishino"
14.	"Ami Nōjō"

=== Type-C ===
CD
No.	Title	Length
1.	"Harujion ga Saku Koro" (ハルジオンが咲く頃)	5:29
2.	"Harukanaru Bhutan" (遥かなるブータン)	4:38
3.	"Tsuribori" (釣り堀)	4:29
4.	"Harujion ga Saku Koro～off vocal ver.～" (ハルジオンが咲く頃 -off vocal ver.-)	5:29
5.	"Harukanaru Bhutan～off vocal ver.～" (遥かなるブータン -off vocal ver.-)	4:38
6.	"Tsuribori～off vocal ver.～" (釣り堀 -off vocal ver.-)	4:28

DVD
No.	Title	Length
1.	"Harujion ga Saku Koro Music Video"
2.	"Tsuribori Music Video"
3.	"Erika Ikuta"
4.	"Rina Ikoma"
5.	"Marika Itō"
6.	"Sayuri Inoue"
7.	"Misa Etō"
8.	"Hina Kawago"
9.	"Yūri Saitō"
10.	"Kotoko Sasaki"
11.	"Mai Shiraishi"
12.	"Ranze Terada"
13.	"Rena Yamazaki"
14.	"Miria Watanabe"

=== Type-D ===
CD
No.	Title	Length
1.	"Harujion ga Saku Koro" (ハルジオンが咲く頃)	5:29
2.	"Harukanaru Bhutan" (遥かなるブータン)	4:38
3.	"Futougou" (不等号)	4:17
4.	"Harujion ga Saku Koro～off vocal ver.～" (ハルジオンが咲く頃 -off vocal ver.-)	5:29
5.	"Harukanaru Bhutan～off vocal ver.～" (遥かなるブータン -off vocal ver.-)	4:38
6.	"Futougou～off vocal ver.～" (不等号 -off vocal ver.-)	4:16

DVD
No.	Title	Length
1.	"Harujion ga Saku Koro Music Video"
2.	"Futougou Music Video"
3.	"Mahiro Kawamura"
4.	"Chiharu Saitō"
5.	"Ayane Suzuki"
6.	"Kana Nakada"
7.	"Nanami Hashimoto"
8.	"Hina Higuchi"
9.	"Mai Fukagawa"
10.	"Minami Hoshino"
11.	"Miona Hori"
12.	"Sayuri Matsumura"
13.	"Yumi Wakatsuki"
14.	"Maaya Wada"

== Participating members ==
3rd Row: Reika Sakurai, Yumi Wakatsuki, Sayuri Matsumura, Rina Ikoma, Marika Itō, Sayuri Inoue, Miona Hori

2nd Row: Asuka Saitō, Kazumi Takayama, Misa Etō, Manatsu Akimoto, Minami Hoshino

1st Row: Nanami Hashimoto, Nanase Nishino, Mai Fukagawa (centre), Mai Shiraishi, Erika Ikuta

== Chart and certifications ==
=== Weekly charts ===
Chart (2016)	Peak position
Japan (Oricon Weekly Singles Chart)	1
Japan (Billboard Japan Hot 100)	1

=== Year-end charts ===
Chart (2016)	Peak position
Japan (Oricon Yearly Singles Chart)	8

=== Certifications ===
Region	Certification	Certified units/sales
Japan (RIAJ)	3× Platinum	750,000^{^}
^{^} Shipments figures based on certification alone.
