= List of Hot 100 number-one singles of 2015 (Japan) =

This is a list of number one singles on the Billboard Japan Hot 100 chart in Japan in 2015. The week's most popular songs in Japan, ranked by the Hanshin Corporation and based on radio airplay measured by Plantech and sales data as compiled by SoundScan Japan.

== Chart history ==
Issue date	Song	Artist(s)	Ref.
January 12	"Thank You Jan!"	Kis-My-Ft2	
January 19	"Kaguya"	News	
January 26	"Uchōten"	B'z	
February 2	"Dead or Alive"	KAT-TUN	
February 9	"Guilty Love"	2PM	
February 16	"Zundoko Paradise"	Johnny's West	
February 23	"Kioku"	Subaru Shibutani	
March 2	"Karei naru Gyakushuu"	SMAP	
March 9	"Sakura"	Arashi	
March 16	"Green Flash"	AKB48	
March 23	"Kiss Kiss Kiss"	KAT-TUN	
March 30	"Inochi wa Utsukushii"	Nogizaka46	
April 6	"Kiss Tamashii"	Kis-My-Ft2	
April 13	"Don't look back!"	NMB48	
April 20	"Maji Love Revolutions"	ST☆RISH	
April 27	"Starting Over"	Sandaime J Soul Brothers from Exile Tribe	
May 4	"Hello, World!"	Bump of Chicken	
May 11	"Chau#"	Hey! Say! JUMP	
May 18	"Timeless"	V6	
May 25	"Aozora no Shita, Kimi no Tonari"	Arashi	
June 1	"Bokutachi wa Tatakawanai"	AKB48	
June 8	"Sugar Song & Bitter Step"	Unison Square Garden	
June 15	"The Strongly Strongly strongly"	Kanjani Eight	
June 22	"Red"	B'z	
June 29	"For You"	BTS	
July 6	"Chumuchumu"	News	
July 13	"Angelic Angel"	μ's	
July 20	"Summer Madness"	Sandaime J Soul Brothers from Exile Tribe featuring Afrojack	
July 27	"Bokutachi wa Hitotsu no Hikari"	μ's	
August 3	"Taiyō Nokku"	Nogizaka46	
August 10	"Bari Hapi"	Johnny's West	
August 17	"Maemuki Scream!"	Kanjani Eight	
August 24	"Mae Nomeri"	SKE48	
August 31	"Kimi ga Kureta Natsu"	Leo Ieiri	
September 7	"Halloween Night"	AKB48	
September 14	"Ai o Sakebe"	Arashi	
September 21	"Otherside"	SMAP	
September 28	"Torisetsu"	Nishino Kana	
October 5	"SOS"	Sekai no Owari	
October 12	"Shin Takarajima"	Sakanaction	
October 19	"Must be now"	NMB48	
October 26	"AAO"	Kis-My-Ft2	
November 2	"Kimi Attraction"	Hey! Say! JUMP	
November 9	"Ima, Hanashitai Dareka ga Iru"	Nogizaka46	
November 16	"Love Me Right〜romantic universe〜"	Exo	
November 23	"Saigo mo Yappari Kimi"	Kis-My-Ft2	
November 30	"Christmas Song"	Back Number	
December 7	"Christmas Song"	Back Number	
December 14	"Samurai Song"	Kanjani Eight	
December 21	"Kuchibiru ni Be My Baby"	AKB48	
December 28	"Colorful Eyes"	Sexy Zone	
