= Red (B'z song) =

Single by B'z
- Released: June 10, 2015
- Length: 3:56
- Label: Vermillion

B'z singles chronology
"Uchōten" (2015)	"Red" (2015)	"Seimei/Still Alive" (2017)

Music video
- "Red" (partial) on YouTube

"Red" is the fifty-second single by Japanese rock duo B'z. It was released on 10 June 2015. It is their first non-album single since 2012's "Go for It, Baby (Kioku no Sanmyaku)" and their first single without a B-side since 1996's "Real Thing Shakes". The song was written to be Hiroshima Toyo Carp's pitcher Hiroki Kuroda's entrance song, and its title is a reference to the club's colors.

Apart from its regular edition, the single also comes in a limited edition with a bonus DVD including the song's promotional video and live footage of their Yokohama Arena concert, part of their B'z LIVE-GYM 2015 -EPIC NIGHT-' tour in promotion of their then recent album Epic Day. It was also released in a "RED Edition" including a red case and a wrist band.

It debuted in number one on the weekly Oricon Singles Chart. It also reached number one on the Billboard Japan Hot 100 and the Top Singles Sales chart. It was ranked #32 at Oricon's 2015 year-end chart and #40 at Billboard Japan's. The Recording Industry Association of Japan certified the single Gold for its sales of 100,000 copies.

== Track listing ==
No.	Title	Length
1.	"Red"	3:56

== Certifications ==
Region	Certification	Certified units/sales
Japan (RIAJ)	Gold	100,000^{^}
^{^} Shipments figures based on certification alone.
