= Taiyō Knock =

2015 single by Nogizaka46

- Cover of Type-A edition.

Single by Nogizaka46

from the album Sorezore no Isu
- B-side: "Mō Sukoshi no Yume"; "Sakanatachi no LOVE SONG" (Type-A); "Muhyōjō" (Type-B); "Wakaregiwa, Motto Suki ni Naru" (Type-C); "Seifuku o Nuide Sayonara o..." (Regular); "Hane no Kioku" (Seven-Eleven Limited)
- Released: July 22, 2015 (Japan)
- Genre: J-pop
- Length: 4:03
- Label: N46Div.
- Producer: Yasushi Akimoto

Nogizaka46 singles chronology
"Inochi wa Utsukushii" (2015)	"Taiyō Knock" (2015)	"Ima, Hanashitai Dareka ga Iru" (2015)

"Taiyō Knock" (Japanese: 太陽ノック, Hepburn: Taiyō Nokku; "Sun Knock") is the 12th single by Japanese idol girl group Nogizaka46. It was released on July 22, 2015. It was number-one on the weekly Oricon Singles Chart, reaching a new record for first week sales by the group, with 609,202 copies. It was the best-selling single in Japan in July, with 629,996 copies. As of November 23, 2015 (issue date) it had sold 678,481 copies. It was also number-one on the Billboard Japan Hot 100. The Japanese television drama series Hatsumori Bemars uses the title song as the theme song.

== Release ==
This single was released in 5 versions. Type-A, Type-B, Type-C and a regular edition, Seven-Eleven Limited Edition. The center position in the choreography for the title song is held by Rina Ikoma.

== Track listing ==
=== Regular ===
CD
No.	Title	Length
1.	"Taiyō Nokku" (太陽ノック)	4:03
2.	"Mō Sukoshi no Yume" (もう少しの夢)	4:57
3.	"Seifuku o Nuide Sayonara o..." (制服を脱いでサヨナラを…)	5:01
4.	"Taiyō Nokku (off vocal ver.)" (太陽ノック off vocal ver.)	4:03
5.	"Mō Sukoshi no Yume (off vocal ver.)" (もう少しの夢 off vocal ver.)	4:57
6.	"Seifuku o Nuide Sayonara o... (off vocal ver.)" (制服を脱いでサヨナラを… off vocal ver.)	5:00

=== Type-A ===
CD
No.	Title	Length
1.	"Taiyō Nokku" (太陽ノック)	4:03
2.	"Mō Sukoshi no Yume" (もう少しの夢)	4:57
3.	"Sakanatachi no LOVE SONG" (魚たちのLOVE SONG)	4:30
4.	"Taiyō Nokku (off vocal ver.)" (太陽ノック off vocal ver.)	4:03
5.	"Mō Sukoshi no Yume (off vocal ver.)" (もう少しの夢 off vocal ver.)	4:57
6.	"Sakanatachi no LOVE SONG (off vocal ver.)" (魚たちのLOVE SONG off vocal ver.)	4:29

DVD
No.	Title	Length
1.	"Taiyō Nokku Music Video"
2.	"Sakanatachi no LOVE SONG Music Video"
3.	"Manatsu Akimoto & Nanase Nishino"
4.	"Rina Ikoma & Sayuri Inoue"
5.	"Karin Itō & Mahiro Kawamura"
6.	"Junna Itō & Ranze Terada"
7.	"Himeka Nakamoto & Ami Nōjō"
8.	"Minami Hoshino & Sayuri Matsumura"

=== Type-B ===
CD
No.	Title	Length
1.	"Taiyō Nokku" (太陽ノック)	4:03
2.	"Mō Sukoshi no Yume" (もう少しの夢)	4:57
3.	"Muhyōjō" (無表情)	3:51
4.	"Taiyō Nokku (off vocal ver.)" (太陽ノック off vocal ver.)	4:03
5.	"Mō Sukoshi no Yume (off vocal ver.)" (もう少しの夢 off vocal ver.)	4:57
6.	"Muhyōjō (off vocal ver.)" (無表情 off vocal ver.)	3:50

DVD
No.	Title	Length
1.	"Taiyō Nokku Music Video"
2.	"Muhyōjō Music Video"
3.	"Erika Ikuta & Mai Shiraishi"
4.	"Misa Etō & Kazumi Takayama"
5.	"Hina Kawago & Iori Sagara"
6.	"Chiharu Saitō & Seira Nagashima"
7.	"Yūri Saitō & Mai Shinuchi"
8.	"Ayane Suzuki & Miria Watanabe"

=== Type-C ===
CD
No.	Title	Length
1.	"Taiyō Nokku" (太陽ノック)	4:03
2.	"Mō Sukoshi no Yume" (もう少しの夢)	4:57
3.	"Wakaregiwa, Motto Suki ni Naru" (別れ際、もっと好きになる)	4:17
4.	"Taiyō Nokku (off vocal ver.)" (太陽ノック off vocal ver.)	4:03
5.	"Mō Sukoshi no Yume (off vocal ver.)" (もう少しの夢 off vocal ver.)	4:57
6.	"Wakaregiwa, Motto Suki ni Naru (off vocal ver.)" (別れ際、もっと好きになる off vocal ver.)	4:16

DVD
No.	Title	Length
1.	"Taiyō Nokku Music Video"
2.	"Wakaregiwa, Motto Suki ni Naru Music Video"
3.	"Marika Itō & Reika Sakurai"
4.	"Hinako Kitano & Miona Hori"
5.	"Asuka Saitō & Nanami Hashimoto"
6.	"Kotoko Sasaki & Maaya Wada"
7.	"Kana Nakada & Hina Higuchi"
8.	"Mai Fukagawa & Yumi Wakatsuki"

=== Seven-Eleven Limited Edition ===
CD
No.	Title	Length
1.	"Taiyō Nokku" (太陽ノック)	4:03
2.	"Mō Sukoshi no Yume" (もう少しの夢)	4:57
3.	"Hane no Kioku" (羽根の記憶)	5:42
4.	"Taiyō Nokku (off vocal ver.)" (太陽ノック off vocal ver.)	4:03
5.	"Mō Sukoshi no Yume (off vocal ver.)" (もう少しの夢 off vocal ver.)	4:57
6.	"Hane no Kioku" (羽根の記憶 off vocal ver.)	5:41

DVD
No.	Title	Length
1.	"Taiyō Nokku Music Video"
2.	"Hane no Kioku Music Video"

== Participating members ==
=== Taiyou Knock ===
3rd Row: Sayuri Matsumura, Yūri Saitō, Minami Hoshino, Asuka Saitō, Marika Itō, Sayuri Inoue, Mai Shinuchi, Misa Etō

2nd Row: Kazumi Takayama, Yumi Wakatsuki, Reika Sakurai, Manatsu Akimoto, Mai Fukagawa

1st Row: Mai Shiraishi, Nanase Nishino, Rina Ikoma, (centre), Erika Ikuta, Nanami Hashimoto

== Chart and certifications ==
=== Weekly charts ===
Chart (2015)	Peak position
Japan (Oricon Weekly Singles Chart)	1
Japan (Billboard Japan Hot 100)	1

=== Year-end charts ===
Chart (2015)	Peak position
Japan (Oricon Yearly Singles Chart)	7

=== Certifications ===
Region	Certification	Certified units/sales
Japan (RIAJ)	3× Platinum	750,000^{^}
^{^} Shipments figures based on certification alone.
