= Ima, Hanashitai Dareka ga Iru =

2015 single by Nogizaka46

- Cover of Type-A edition.

Single by Nogizaka46

from the album Sorezore no Isu
- B-side: "Shitto no Kenri"; "Popipappapā" (Type-A); "Otona e no Chikamichi" (Type-B); "Kanashimi no Wasurekata" (Type-C); "Sukima" (Regular and Kokosake)
- Released: October 28, 2015 (Japan)
- Genre: J-pop
- Length: 4:24
- Label: N46Div.
- Producer: Yasushi Akimoto

Nogizaka46 singles chronology
"Taiyō Nokku" (2015)	"Ima, Hanashitai Dareka ga Iru" (2015)	"Harujion ga Sakukoro" (2016)

"Ima, Hanashitai Dareka ga Iru" (Japanese: 今、話したい誰かがいる; "Now, I have someone I want to talk to") is the 13th single by Japanese idol girl group Nogizaka46. It was released on October 28, 2015. It was number-one on the weekly Oricon Singles Chart, with 626,905 copies sold, becoming the best-selling single in Japan in October. It was the sixth best-selling single of 2015 in Japan according to the Oricon Yearly Singles Chart, with 686,539 copies sold. As of February 29, 2016 (issue date) it had sold 729,690 copies. It was also number-one on the Billboard Japan Hot 100.

== Release ==
This single was released in 5 versions. Type-A, Type-B, Type-C and a regular edition, Kokosake (Limited) Edition. The Japanese animated film The Anthem of the Heart has the title song of the single as its theme song. The coupling song Kanashimi no Wasurekata is used as a thema song for their first documentary film Kanashimi no Wasurekata Documentary of Nogizaka46.

The center position in the choreography for the title song is held by Nanase Nishino and Mai Shiraishi.

== Track listing ==
=== Type-A ===
CD
No.	Title	Length
1.	"Ima, Hanashitai Dareka ga Iru" (今、話したい誰かがいる)	4:24
2.	"Shitto no Kenri" (嫉妬の権利)	5:18
3.	"Popipappapā" (ポピパッパパー)	4:02
4.	"Ima, Hanashitai Dareka ga Iru (off vocal ver.)" (今、話したい誰かがいる -off vocal ver.-)	4:24
5.	"Shitto no Kenri (off vocal ver.)" (嫉妬の権利 -off vocal ver.-)	5:18
6.	"Popipappapā (off vocal ver.)" (ポピパッパパー -off vocal ver.-)	4:01

DVD
No.	Title	Length
1.	"Ima, Hanashitai Dareka ga Iru Music Video"
2.	"Popipappapā Music Video"
3.	"Erika Ikuta"
4.	"Rina Ikoma"
5.	"Sayuri Inoue"
6.	"Hina Kawago"
7.	"Mahiro Kawamura"
8.	"Hinako Kitano"
9.	"Yūri Saitō"
10.	"Reika Sakurai"
11.	"Kotoko Sasaki"
12.	"Nanase Nishino"
13.	"Hina Higuchi"
14.	"Yumi Wakatsuki"

=== Type-B ===
CD
No.	Title	Length
1.	"Ima, Hanashitai Dareka ga Iru" (今、話したい誰かがいる)	4:24
2.	"Shitto no Kenri" (嫉妬の権利)	5:18
3.	"Otona e no Chikamichi" (大人への近道)	5:17
4.	"Ima, Hanashitai Dareka ga Iru (off vocal ver.)" (今、話したい誰かがいる -off vocal ver.-)	4:24
5.	"Shitto no Kenri (off vocal ver.)" (嫉妬の権利 -off vocal ver.-)	5:18
6.	"Otona e no Chikamichi (off vocal ver.)" (大人への近道 -off vocal ver.-)	5:16

DVD
No.	Title	Length
1.	"Ima, Hanashitai Dareka ga Iru Music Video"
2.	"Shitto no Kenri Music Video"
3.	"Manatsu Akimoto"
4.	"Karin Itō"
5.	"Junna Itō"
6.	"Marika Itō"
7.	"Asuka Saitō"
8.	"Mai Shiraishi"
9.	"Ranze Terada"
10.	"Himeka Nakamoto"
11.	"Seira Nagashima"
12.	"Minami Hoshino"
13.	"Rena Yamazaki"
14.	"Miria Watanabe"

=== Type-C ===
CD
No.	Title	Length
1.	"Ima, Hanashitai Dareka ga Iru" (今、話したい誰かがいる)	4:24
2.	"Shitto no Kenri" (嫉妬の権利)	5:18
3.	"Kanashimi no Wasurekata" (悲しみの忘れ方)	4:29
4.	"Ima, Hanashitai Dareka ga Iru (off vocal ver.)" (今、話したい誰かがいる -off vocal ver.-)	4:24
5.	"Shitto no Kenri (off vocal ver.)" (嫉妬の権利 -off vocal ver.-)	5:18
6.	"Kanashimi no Wasurekata (off vocal ver.)" (悲しみの忘れ方 -off vocal ver.-)	4:28

DVD
No.	Title	Length
1.	"Ima, Hanashitai Dareka ga Iru Music Video"
2.	"Shitto no Kenri Music Video"
3.	"Misa Etō"
4.	"Chiharu Saitō"
5.	"Iori Sagara"
6.	"Mai Shinuchi"
7.	"Ayane Suzuki"
8.	"Kazumi Takayama"
9.	"Kana Nakada"
10.	"Ami Nōjō"
11.	"Nanami Hashimoto"
12.	"Mai Fukagawa"
13.	"Miona Hori"
14.	"Sayuri Matsumura"
15.	"Maaya Wada"

=== Regular and Kokosake (Limited) Edition ===
CD
No.	Title	Length
1.	"Ima, Hanashitai Dareka ga Iru" (今、話したい誰かがいる)	4:24
2.	"Shitto no Kenri" (嫉妬の権利)	5:18
3.	"Sukima" (隙間)	5:02
4.	"Ima, Hanashitai Dareka ga Iru (off vocal ver.)" (今、話したい誰かがいる -off vocal ver.-)	4:24
5.	"Shitto no Kenri (off vocal ver.)" (嫉妬の権利 -off vocal ver.-)	5:18
6.	"Sukima (off vocal ver.)" (隙間 -off vocal ver.-)	5:01

== Participating members ==
=== Ima, Hanashitai Dareka Ga Iru ===
3rd Row: Reika Sakurai, Yumi Wakatsuki, Rina Ikoma, Sayuri Matsumura, Marika Itō, Sayuri Inoue

2nd Row: Asuka Saitō, Kazumi Takayama, Nanami Hashimoto, Erika Ikuta, Manatsu Akimoto, Minami Hoshino

1st Row: Misa Etō, Nanase Nishino, Mai Shiraishi, Mai Fukagawa

== Chart and certifications ==
=== Weekly charts ===
Chart (2015)	Peak position
Japan (Oricon Weekly Singles Chart)	1
Japan (Billboard Japan Hot 100)	1

=== Year-end charts ===
Chart (2015)	Peak position
Japan (Oricon Yearly Singles Chart)	6

=== Certifications ===
Region	Certification	Certified units/sales
Japan (RIAJ)	3× Platinum	750,000^{^}
^{^} Shipments figures based on certification alone.
