= Pentagon (Japanese band) =

Japanese visual kei rock band

- Origin: Japan
- Genres: Metal; death metal; nu metal
- Years active: 2014–2020
- Labels: Goemon
- Members: Chizuru; Taku; Yutori; Minpha; Atsuki
- Website: pentagon-official.com

Pentagon (ペンタゴン) is a Japanese visual kei rock band formed in 2014. Members Chizuru and Minpha started the limited time band 'Call Me ...' as a two-member unit, with Taku on guitar and Atsuki on drums. After 13 December 2014, Atsuki and Taku became official members and Yutori was added to the band.

In February, 2015, the band released their debut album titled, Call Me. On April 29, 2015, their debut single, titled "Shōnen Waltz" was released. On July 24, 2019, the band announced it would stop activities in February 2020.

== Members ==
- Chizuru (千吊) – vocals
- Taku (拓) – guitar
- Yutori (ゆとり) – guitar
- Minpha (眠花) – bass
- Atsuki (篤輝) – drums

== Discography ==
=== Albums ===
==== Studio albums ====
Title	Album details	Peak chart positions		Sales
Title	Album details	Oricon Albums Chart	Billboard Japan Top Albums Sales (Note: Week references for Billboard Japan Top Albums Sales: Welcome to Ghost Hotel, Zekkyō!.)	Sales
Call Me...	Released: February 18, 2015; Label: Goemon Records; Format: CD, digital download	39	—	
Welcome to Ghost Hotel	Released: January 27, 2016; Label: Goemon Records; Format: CD, digital download	37	95	

==== Mini-albums ====
Title	Album details	Peak chart positions		Sales
Title	Album details	Oricon Albums Chart	Billboard Japan Top Albums Sales	Sales
Zekkyō! (絶叫!, Screaming!)	Released: August 17, 2016; Label: Goemon Records; Format: CD, digital download	19	69	

=== Singles ===
Title	Year	Peak chart positions	Sales	Album
Title	Year	Oricon Singles Chart	Sales	Album
"Shōnen Waltz" (少年ワルツ)	2015	49		Welcome to Ghost Hotel
"Hijiki to Karāge (Jesus Phobia/Tetsukizu)" (ひじきとカラアゲ(Jesus phobia/テツキズ))	2015	26		Non-album single
"Popcorn Monster" (ポップコーンモンスター)	2016	30		Zekkyō!
