= Kizuitara Kataomoi =

2014 single by Nogizaka46

- Regular edition cover

Single by Nogizaka46

from the album Tōmei na Iro
- B-side: "Romance no Start"; "Toiki no Method" (Type-A); "Kodoku Kyōdai" (Type-B); "Umareta Mama de" (Type-C); "Danke schön" (Regular)
- Released: April 2, 2014 (Japan)
- Genre: J-pop
- Length: 23:55
- Label: N46Div.
- Songwriters: Akira Sunset; Makoto Oshida
- Producer: Yasushi Akimoto

Nogizaka46 singles chronology
"Barrette" (2013)	"Kizuitara Kataomoi" (2014)	"Natsu no Free & Easy" (2014)

"Kizuitara Kataomoi" (Japanese: 気づいたら片想い; "When I realized its unrequited love") is the 8th single by Nogizaka46. It was released on April 2, 2014. It debuted in number one on the weekly Oricon Singles Chart. It's the 6th best-selling single of the year, as of June 18. It has sold a total of 546,369 copies, as of August 11. It reached number one on the Billboard Japan Hot 100. It was the 10th best-selling single of the year in Japan, with 546,832 copies.

== Release ==
This single was released in 4 versions. Type-A, Type-B, Type-C and a regular edition. The center position in the choreography for the title song is held by Nanase Nishino.

== Track listing ==
=== Type-A ===
CD
No.	Title	Length
1.	"Kizuitara Kataomoi" (気づいたら片想い)	4:14
2.	"Romance no Start" (ロマンスのスタート)	4:02
3.	"Toiki no Method" (吐息のメソッド)	4:19
4.	"Kizuitara Kataomoi (off vocal ver.)" (気づいたら片想い off vocal ver.)	4:12
5.	"Romance no Start (off vocal ver.)" (ロマンスのスタート off vocal ver.)	4:02
6.	"Toiki no Method (off vocal ver.)" (吐息のメソッド off vocal ver.)	4:16

DVD
No.	Title	Length
1.	"Kizuitara Kataomoi Music Video"
2.	"Romance no Start Music Video"
3.	"Creator's Etude Makoto Ueda"
4.	"Creator's Etude Naruhiro Gonpa"
5.	"Creator's Etude Satoshi Miki"

=== Type-B ===
CD
No.	Title	Length
1.	"Kizuitara Kataomoi" (気づいたら片想い)	4:14
2.	"Romance no Start" (ロマンスのスタート)	4:02
3.	"Kodoku Kyōdai" (孤独兄弟)	3:57
4.	"Kizuitara Kataomoi (off vocal ver.)" (気づいたら片想い off vocal ver.)	4:12
5.	"Romance no Start (off vocal ver.)" (ロマンスのスタート off vocal ver.)	4:02
6.	"Kodoku Kyōdai (off vocal ver.)" (孤独兄弟 off vocal ver.)	3:56

DVD
No.	Title	Length
1.	"Kizuitara Kataomoi Music Video"
2.	"Kodoku Kyōdai Music Video"
3.	"Creator's Etude Yutaka Kuramochi"
4.	"Creator's Etude Masaru Hamaguchi"
5.	"Creator's Etude Shō Yanagisawa"

=== Type-C ===
CD
No.	Title	Length
1.	"Kizuitara Kataomoi" (気づいたら片想い)	4:14
2.	"Romance no Start" (ロマンスのスタート)	4:02
3.	"Umareta Mama de" (生まれたままで)	4:42
4.	"Kizuitara Kataomoi (off vocal ver.)" (気づいたら片想い off vocal ver.)	4:12
5.	"Romance no Start (off vocal ver.)" (ロマンスのスタート off vocal ver.)	4:02
6.	"Umareta Mama de (off vocal ver.)" (生まれたままで off vocal ver.)	4:40

DVD
No.	Title	Length
1.	"Kizuitara Kataomoi Music Video"
2.	"Umareta Mama de Music Video"
3.	"Documentary Nogizaka no 4 nin"

=== Regular Edition ===
CD
No.	Title	Lyrics	Music	Artist(s)	Length
1.	"Kizuitara Kataomoi" (気づいたら片思い)	Yasushi Akimoto	Akira Sunset	Nanase Nishino, et cetera	4:14
2.	"Romance no Start" (ロマンスのスタート)	Yasushi Akimoto	Makoto Oshida	Nanase Nishino, et cetera	4:02
3.	"Danke schön" (ダンケシェーン)	Yasushi Akimoto	Akira Sunset	Erika Ikuta, et cetera	3:42
4.	"Kizuitara Kataomoi (off vocal ver.)" (気づいたら片思い off vocal ver.)		Akira Sunset		4:12
5.	"Romance no Start (off vocal ver.)" (ロマンスのスタート off vocal ver.)		Makoto Oshida		4:02
6.	"Danke schön (off vocal ver.)" (ダンケシェーン off vocal ver.)		Akira Sunset		3:41

== Participating members ==
Centre: Nanase Nishino

3rd Row: Mahiro Kawamura, Hinako Kitano, Hina Higuchi, Manatsu Akimoto, Maaya Wada, Kazumi Takayama

2nd Row: Reika Sakurai, Yumi Wakatsuki, Erika Ikuta, Sayuri Matsumura, Mai Fukagawa

1st Row: Miona Hori, Mai Shiraishi, Nanase Nishino (centre), Nanami Hashimoto, Rina Ikoma

== Chart and certifications ==
=== Weekly charts ===
Chart (2014)	Peak position
Japan (Oricon Weekly Singles Chart)	1
Japan (Billboard Japan Hot 100)	1

=== Year-end charts ===
Chart (2014)	Peak position
Japan (Oricon Yearly Singles Chart)	10

=== Certifications ===
Region	Certification	Certified units/sales
Japan (RIAJ)	2× Platinum	500,000^{^}
^{^} Shipments figures based on certification alone.
