= Sorezore no Isu =

- Type A cover

Studio album by Nogizaka46
- Released: May 25, 2016 (Japan)
- Genre: J-pop
- Label: N46Div.
- Producer: Yasushi Akimoto

Nogizaka46 chronology
Tōmei na Iro (2015)	Sorezore no Isu (2016)	Umarete Kara Hajimete Mita Yume (2017)

Singles from Sorezore no Isu
- 1. "Inochi wa Utsukushii" Released: March 18, 2015; 2. "Taiyō Knock" Released: July 22, 2015; 3. "Ima, Hanashitai Dareka ga Iru" Released: October 28, 2015; 4. "Harujion ga Sakukoro" Released: March 23, 2016

Sorezore no Isu (Japanese: それぞれの椅子; "Each chair") is the second album of Japanese idol girl group Nogizaka46. It was released on May 25, 2016. It was number-one on the weekly Oricon Albums Chart, with 274,873 copies sold. It was also number-one on the Billboard Japan Hot 100. In May 2016, the album was certified Platinum by the Recording Industry Association of Japan.

== Release ==
It was released in 5 types. Type-A, Type-B, Type-C, Type-D and a regular edition. Each type has a limited edition. Type-A, Type-B and Type-C includes a DVD with the live music video Nogizaka46 Summer National Tour 2014 Final! @Meiji Jingu Stadium. Type-D includes special movies shot by their manager. The album cover photo was taken in The National Art Center where connected directly to Tokyo Metro Nogizaka Station.

== Track listing ==
=== Regular Edition ===
CD
No.	Title	Length
1.	"Inochi wa Utsukushii" (命は美しい)	5:15
2.	"Taiyou Knock" (太陽ノック)	4:03
3.	"Ima, Hanashitai Dareka ga Iru" (今、話したい誰かがいる)	4:24
4.	"Harujion ga Sakukoro" (ハルジオンが咲く頃)	5:29
5.	"Kikkake" (きっかけ)	5:20
6.	"Taiyou ni Kudokarete" (太陽に口説かれて)	4:11
7.	"Yokubō no Reincarnation" (欲望のリインカーネーション)	4:19
8.	"Kanashimi no Wasurekata" (悲しみの忘れ方)	4:29
9.	"Kuukikan" (空気感)	3:54
10.	"Kougousei Kibou" (光合成希望)	3:56
11.	"Muhyoujou" (無表情)	3:51
12.	"Arakajime Katarareru Romance" (あらかじめ語られるロマンス)	4:55
13.	"Sukima" (隙間)	5:02
14.	"Kyuushamen" (急斜面)	3:46
15.	"Hane no Kioku" (羽根の記憶)	5:42
16.	"Nogizaka no Uta" (乃木坂の詩)	4:30

=== Type A ===
CD
No.	Title	Length
1.	"Inochi wa Utsukushii" (命は美しい)	5:15
2.	"Taiyou Knock" (太陽ノック)	4:03
3.	"Ima, Hanashitai Dareka ga Iru" (今、話したい誰かがいる)	4:24
4.	"Harujion ga Sakukoro" (ハルジオンが咲く頃)	5:29
5.	"Kikkake" (きっかけ)	5:20
6.	"Taiyou ni Kudokarete" (太陽に口説かれて)	4:11
7.	"Yokubō no Reincarnation" (欲望のリインカーネーション)	4:19
8.	"Kanashimi no Wasurekata" (悲しみの忘れ方)	4:29
9.	"Kuukikan" (空気感)	3:54
10.	"Kougousei Kibou" (光合成希望)	3:56
11.	"Muhyoujou" (無表情)	3:51
12.	"Arakajime Katarareru Romance" (あらかじめ語られるロマンス)	4:55
13.	"Sukima" (隙間)	5:02
14.	"Kyuushamen" (急斜面)	3:46
15.	"Hane no Kioku" (羽根の記憶)	5:42
16.	"Nogizaka no Uta" (乃木坂の詩)	4:30

DVD
No.	Title	Length
1.	"Natsu no Free & Easy"
2.	"Romance no Start"
3.	"Aitakatta Kamo Shirenai"
4.	"Romantic Ikayaki"
5.	"Girls' Rule"
6.	"Nani mo Dekizu ni Soba ni Iru"
7.	"Umareta Mama de"
8.	"Kokojanai Dokoka"
9.	"Yubi Bōenkyō"
10.	"Tsuki no Ōkisa"
11.	"Ushinaitaku Nai Kara"
12.	"Ningen to Iu Gakki"

=== Type B ===
CD
No.	Title	Length
1.	"Inochi wa Utsukushii" (命は美しい)	5:15
2.	"Taiyou Knock" (太陽ノック)	4:03
3.	"Ima, Hanashitai Dareka ga Iru" (今、話したい誰かがいる)	4:24
4.	"Harujion ga Sakukoro" (ハルジオンが咲く頃)	5:29
5.	"Kikkake" (きっかけ)	5:20
6.	"Taiyou ni Kudokarete" (太陽に口説かれて)	4:11
7.	"Yokubō no Reincarnation" (欲望のリインカーネーション)	4:19
8.	"Kanashimi no Wasurekata" (悲しみの忘れ方)	4:29
9.	"Threefold choice"	3:43
10.	"Teitaion no Kiss" (低体温のキス)	4:00
11.	"Harukanaru Bhutan" (遥かなるブータン)
12.	"Popipappapā" (ポピパッパパー)
13.	"Seifuku o Nuide Sayonara o..." (制服を脱いでサヨナラを…)
14.	"Yūutsu to Fūsengamu" (憂鬱と風船ガム)
15.	"Tachinaori Chū" (立ち直り中)
16.	"Nogizaka no Uta" (乃木坂の詩)

DVD
No.	Title	Length
1.	"Hito wa Naze Hashiru no ka?"
2.	"Sekkachi na Katatsumuri"
3.	"Hidarimune no Yūki"
4.	"Nandome no Aozora ka?"
5.	"Danke schön"
6.	"Sonna Baka na..."
7.	"Kokoro no Kusuri"
8.	"13 Nichi no Kinyōbi"
9.	"Senpūki"
10.	"Sono Saki no Deguchi"
11.	"Mukuchi na Lion"
12.	"Boku ga Ikanakya Dare ga Ikunda?"
13.	"Dekopin"
14.	"Toiki no Method"

=== Type C ===
CD
No.	Title	Length
1.	"Inochi wa Utsukushii" (命は美しい)	5:15
2.	"Taiyou Knock" (太陽ノック)	4:03
3.	"Ima, Hanashitai Dareka ga Iru" (今、話したい誰かがいる)	4:24
4.	"Harujion ga Sakukoro" (ハルジオンが咲く頃)	5:29
5.	"Kikkake" (きっかけ)	5:20
6.	"Taiyou ni Kudokarete" (太陽に口説かれて)	4:11
7.	"Yokubō no Reincarnation" (欲望のリインカーネーション)	4:19
8.	"Kanashimi no Wasurekata" (悲しみの忘れ方)	4:29
9.	"Shitsuren Shitara, Kao wo Arae!" (失恋したら、顔を洗え！)	4:00
10.	"Kakigōri no Kataomoi" (かき氷の片想い)	4:27
11.	"Otona e no Chikamichi" (大人への近道)
12.	"Kimi wa Boku to Awanai Hou ga Yokatta no Kana" (君は僕と会わない方がよかったのかな)
13.	"Wakaregiwa, Motto Suki ni Naru" (別れ際、もっと好きになる)
14.	"Shitto no Kenri" (嫉妬の権利)
15.	"Futougou" (不等号)
16.	"Nogizaka no Uta" (乃木坂の詩)	4:30

DVD
No.	Title	Length
1.	"Sekai de Ichiban Kodoku na Lover"
2.	"Seifuku no Mannequin"
3.	"Koko ni Iru Riyū"
4.	"Barrette"
5.	"Hashire! Bicycle"
6.	"Oide Shampoo"
7.	"Kimi no Na wa Kibō"
8.	"Kizuitara Kataomoi"
9.	"Guruguru Curtain"
10.	"Nogizaka no Uta"

=== Type D ===
CD
No.	Title	Length
1.	"Inochi wa Utsukushii" (命は美しい)	5:15
2.	"Taiyou Knock" (太陽ノック)	4:03
3.	"Ima, Hanashitai Dareka ga Iru" (今、話したい誰かがいる)	4:24
4.	"Harujion ga Sakukoro" (ハルジオンが咲く頃)	5:29
5.	"Kikkake" (きっかけ)	5:20
6.	"Taiyou ni Kudokarete" (太陽に口説かれて)	4:11
7.	"Yokubō no Reincarnation" (欲望のリインカーネーション)	4:19
8.	"Kanashimi no Wasurekata" (悲しみの忘れ方)	4:29
9.	"Kanjou Rokugousen" (環状六号線)
10.	"Kuchiyakusoku" (口約束)
11.	"Romantic Ikayaki" (ロマンティックいか焼き)
12.	"House!" (ハウス！)
13.	"Sonna Baka na..." (そんなバカな…)
14.	"Shakiism" (シャキイズム)
15.	"Romance no Start" (ロマンスのスタート)
16.	"Nogizaka no Uta" (乃木坂の詩)	4:30

DVD
No.	Title	Length
1.	"Mayuko no Douga"

== Charts ==
Chart (2016)	Peak position
Japan (Oricon Weekly Albums Chart)	1
Japan (Billboard Japan Hot 100)	1

=== Certifications ===
Certification	Sales (copies)
RIAJ physical shipping certification	Platinum
