= Inochi wa Utsukushii =

2015 single by Nogizaka46

- Cover of Type-A edition.

Single by Nogizaka46

from the album Sorezore no Isu
- B-side: "Arakajime Katarareru Romance"; "Tachinaori Chū" (Type-A); "Gomen ne Zutto..." (Type-B); "Kimi wa Boku to Awanai Hou ga Yokatta no Kana" (Type-C); "Border" (Regular)
- Released: March 18, 2015 (Japan)
- Genre: J-pop
- Length: 5:17
- Label: N46Div.
- Songwriters: Yasushi Akimoto, Hiroki Sagawa
- Producer: Yasushi Akimoto

Nogizaka46 singles chronology
"Nandome no Aozora ka?" (2014)	"Inochi wa Utsukushii" (2015)	"Taiyō Nokku" (2015)

"Inochi wa Utsukushii" (Japanese: 命は美しい; "Life is beautiful") is the 11th single by Japanese idol girl group Nogizaka46. It was released on March 18, 2015. It debuted in number one on the weekly Oricon Singles Chart, and as of May 25, 2015 (issue date), has sold 605,529 copies. It also reached number one on the Billboard Japan Hot 100.

== Release ==
This single was released in 4 versions. Type-A, Type-B, Type-C and a regular edition. Type-C includes the undergroup member's song. The center position in the choreography for the title song is held by Nanase Nishino.

== Track listing ==
=== Type-A ===
All lyrics are written by Yasushi Akimoto

CD
No.	Title	Music	Arranger	Length
1.	"Inochi wa Utsukushii" (命は美しい)	Hiroki Sagawa	Hiroki Sagawa	5:17
2.	"Arakajime Katarareru Romance" (あらかじめ語られるロマンス)	SoichiroK, Nozomu.S	SoichiroK, Nozomu.S	4:56
3.	"Tachinaori Chū" (立ち直り中)	Takashi Fukuda	TATOO	4:44
4.	"Inochi wa Utsukushii (off vocal ver.)" (命は美しい off vocal ver.)	Hiroki Sagawa	Hiroki Sagawa	5:17
5.	"Arakajime Katarareru Romance (off vocal ver.)" (あらかじめ語られるロマンス off vocal ver.)	SoichiroK, Nozomu.S	SoichiroK, Nozomu.S	4:56
6.	"Tachinaori Chū (off vocal ver.)" (立ち直り中 off vocal ver.)	Takashi Fukuda	TATOO	4:42
Total length:				29:52

DVD
No.	Title	Director	Length
1.	"Inochi wa Utsukushii (music video)"	Tsuyoshi Inoue	5:41
2.	"Tachinaori Chū (music video)"	Hiroaki Yuasa	10:11
3.	"Rina Ikoma & Marika Ito"	Eiki Takahashi	8:32
4.	"Misa Eto & Reika Sakurai"	Rikiya Imaizumi	5:58
5.	"Hina Kawago & Chiharu Saito"	Renki Yamasaki	5:46
6.	"Mahiro Kawamura & Iori Sagara"	Yoshinori Asao	8:13
7.	"Kazumi Takayama & Ami Noujou"	Nozomu Nakajima	6:27
8.	"Nanase Nishino & Yumi Wakatsuki"	Hiroaki Yuasa	8:42
Total length:			59:22

=== Type-B ===
All lyrics are written by Yasushi Akimoto

CD
No.	Title	Music	Arranger	Length
1.	"Inochi wa Utsukushii" (命は美しい)	Hiroki Sagawa	Hiroki Sagawa	5:17
2.	Untitled (あらかじめ語られるロマンス)	SoichiroK, Nozomu.S	SoichiroK, Nozomu.S	4:56
3.	"Gomen ne Zutto..." (ごめんね ずっと…)	Tomokazu Yamada	Shouhei Sumiya	5:31
4.	"Inochi wa Utsukushii (off vocal ver.)" (命は美しい off vocal ver.)	Hiroki Sagawa	Hiroki Sagawa	5:17
5.	"Arakajime Katarareru Romance" (あらかじめ語られるロマンス off vocal ver.)	SoichiroK, Nozomu.S	SoichiroK, Nozomu.S	4:56
6.	"Gomen ne Zutto... (off vocal ver.)" (ごめんね ずっと… off vocal ver.)	Tomokazu Yamada	Shouhei Sumiya	5:28
Total length:				31:25

DVD
No.	Title	Director	Length
1.	"Inochi wa Utsukushii (music video)"	Tsuyoshi Inoue	5:41
2.	"Gomen ne Zutto... (music video)"	Yuki Yamato	7:26
3.	"Karin Ito & Hina Higuchi"	Kazuhiko Ito
4.	"Sayuri Inoue & Yuuri Saito"	Yusuke Koroyasu
5.	"Asuka Saito & Minami Hoshino"	Aya Maeda
6.	"Mai Shiraishi & Nanami Hashimoto"	Kazuma Ikeda
7.	"Mai Shinuchi & Mai Fukagawa"	Taikou Nakamura

=== Type-C ===
All lyrics are written by Yasushi Akimoto

CD
No.	Title	Music	Arranger	Length
1.	"Inochi wa Utsukushii" (命は美しい)	Hiroki Sagawa	Hiroki Sagawa	5:17
2.	"Arakajime Katarareru Romance" (あらかじめ語られるロマンス)	SoichiroK, Nozomu.S	SoichiroK, Nozomu.S	4:56
3.	"Kimi wa Boku to Awanai Hou ga Yokatta no Kana" (君は僕と会わない方がよかったのかな)	Akira Sunset, ha-j	Akira Sunset, ha-j	5:06
4.	"Inochi wa Utsukushii (off vocal ver.)" (命は美しい off vocal ver.)	Hiroki Sagawa	Hiroki Sagawa	5:17
5.	"Arakajime Katarareru Romance (off vocal ver.)" (あらかじめ語られるロマンス off vocal ver.)	SoichiroK, Nozomu.S	SoichiroK, Nozomu.S	4:56
6.	"Kimi wa Boku to Awanai Hou ga Yokatta no Kana (off vocal ver.)" (君は僕と会わない方がよかったのかな off vocal ver.)	Akira Sunset, ha-j	Akira Sunset, ha-j	5:03
Total length:				30:35

DVD
No.	Title	Director	Length
1.	"Inochi wa Utsukushii (music video)"	Tsuyoshi Inoue	5:41
2.	"Kimi wa Boku to Awanai Hou ga Yokatta no Kana (music video)"	Yamada Atsuhiro	5:10
3.	"Manatsu Akimoto & Himeka Nakamoto"	Hideaki Nakagawa, Yutaka Mizuochi, Naoya Ogata
4.	"Erika Ikuta & Sayuri Matsumura"	Shigeru Tsukita, Atuhiko Yamamoto, Shibatani Mai
5.	"Hinako Kitano & Maaya Wada"	Kazuhisa Anai
6.	"Kana Nakada & Seira Nagashima"	Takahashi Akihiro
7.	"Miona Hori & Rena Matsui"	Santa Yamagishi
8.	"Trainee"	Shujin Ito

=== Regular ===
All lyrics are written by Yasushi Akimoto.

CD
No.	Title	Music	Arranger	Length
1.	"Inochi wa Utsukushii" (命は美しい)	Hiroki Sagawa	Hiroki Sagawa	5:17
2.	"Arakajime Katarareru Romance" (あらかじめ語られるロマンス)	SoichiroK, Nozomu.S	SoichiroK, Nozomu.S	4:56
3.	"Border" (ボーダー)	Tomohiro Nakatsuchi	Tomohiro Nakatsuchi	4:39
4.	"Inochi wa Utsukushii (off vocal ver.)" (命は美しい off vocal ver.)	Hiroki Sagawa	Hiroki Sagawa	5:17
5.	"Arakajime Katarareru Romance (off vocal ver.)" (あらかじめ語られるロマンス off vocal ver.)	SoichiroK, Nozomu.S	SoichiroK, Nozomu.S	4:56
6.	"Border (off vocal ver.)" (ボーダー off vocal ver.)	Tomohiro Nakatsuchi	Tomohiro Nakatsuchi	4:37
Total length:				29:42

== Chart and certifications ==
=== Weekly charts ===
Chart (2015)	Peak position
Japan (Oricon Weekly Singles Chart)	1
Japan (Billboard Japan Hot 100)	1

=== Year-end charts ===
Chart (2015)	Peak position
Japan (Oricon Yearly Singles Chart)	8

=== Certifications ===
Region	Certification	Certified units/sales
Japan (RIAJ)	2× Platinum	500,000^{^}
^{^} Shipments figures based on certification alone.
