= Sekai no Owari discography =

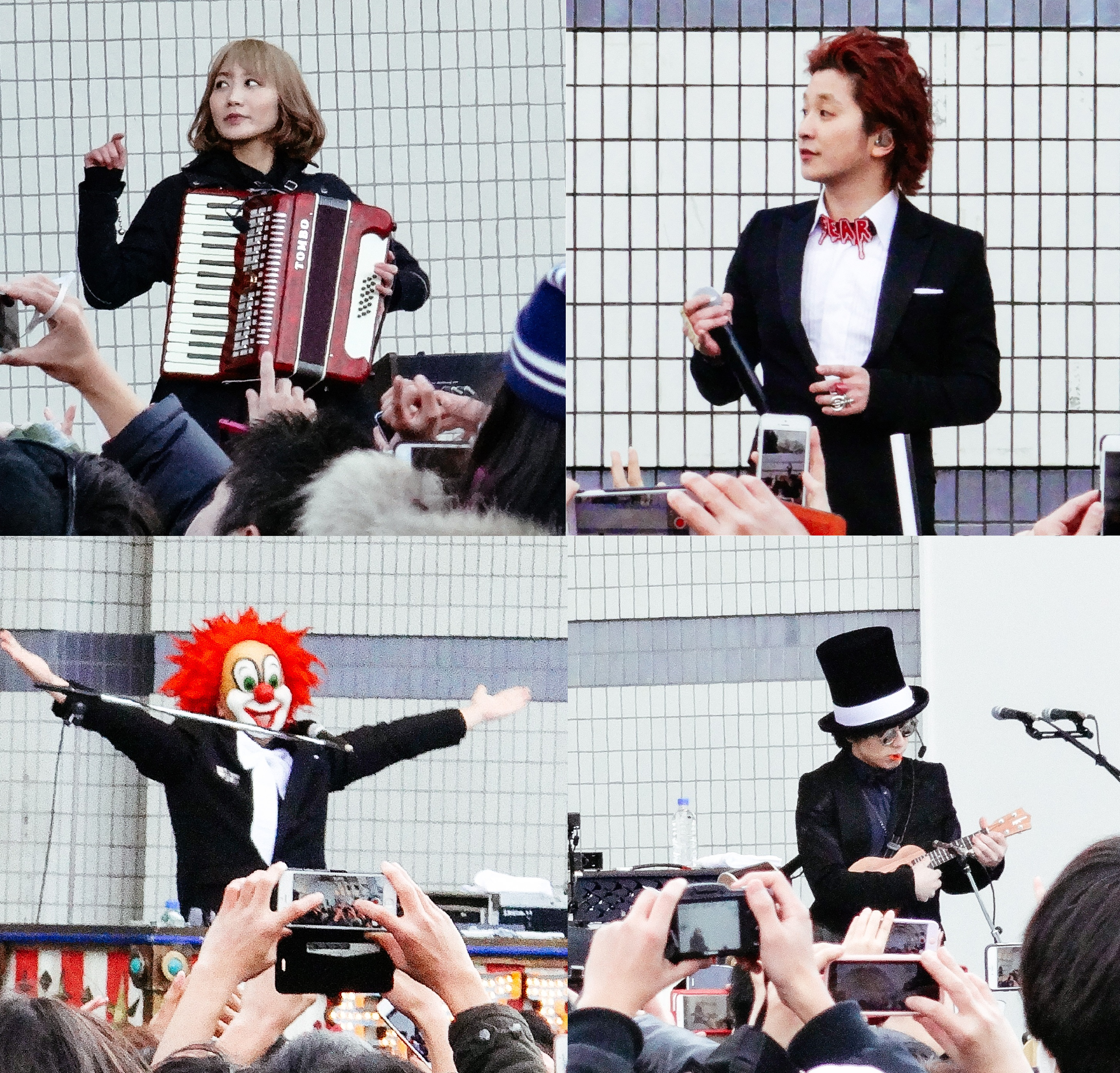
- Sekai no Owari performing a free concert to promote their album Tree in 2015. (from top left clockwise: Saori, Fukase, Nakajin and DJ Love)
- Studio albums: 8
- EPs: 1
- Compilation albums: 1
- Singles: 36
- Video albums: 9

The discography of Japanese rock band Sekai no Owari consists of eight studio albums, two extended play, four video albums and twelve singles. After self-releasing their first extended play in 2009, Sekai no Owari debuted as an independent artist in 2010 under Lastrum Music Entertainment with the album Earth. After releasing a double A-side single "Tenshi to Akuma" / "Fantasy" at the end of 2010, Sekai no Owari parted with their previous label, signing with major label Toy's Factory. The group released their second album Entertainment in 2012, immediately after "Nemurihime", the band's first top five single on the Oricon singles charts.

The band's 2013 single "RPG" became widely successful, reaching number one on the Billboard Japan Hot 100, and later becoming certified double platinum by the RIAJ. Following this with the also successful singles "Snow Magic Fantasy" (2014), "Honō to Mori no Carnival" (2014) and the Nicky Romero-produced "Dragon Night" (2014). These releases culminated in the group's third album, Tree, which debuted at number one in Japan.

In addition to the band's main releases, the band has collaborated with American electronic act Owl City for the single "Tokyo" (2014), and vocalist Fukase with dōjin music project Livetune for the single "Take Your Way" (2013). The band members wrote the Johnny & Associates boyband Kanjani Eight's single "Namida no Kotae" (2013), the theme song for the drama Hyakkai Naku Koto.

Though primarily singing in Japanese, Sekai no Owari released an English language version of "Dragon Night" in June 2015. For the release of the films Attack on Titan and Attack on Titan: End of the World (2015), Sekai no Owari released two entirely English language singles for the theme songs, "Anti-Hero" and "SOS".

== Albums ==
=== Studio albums ===
List of studio albums, with selected chart positions, sales and certification
Title	Details	Peak chart positions	Sales	Certifications
Title	Details	JPN	Sales	Certifications
Sekai no Owari
Earth	Released: April 7, 2010 (JPN); Label: Lastrum; Formats: CD, digital download	15		
Entertainment	Released: July 18, 2012 (JPN); Label: Toy's Factory; Formats: CD, CD+DVD, digital download	2		RIAJ: Platinum
Tree	Released: January 14, 2015 (JPN); Label: Toy's Factory; Formats: CD, CD+DVD, digital download	1	JPN: 499,290	RIAJ: 2× Platinum
Lip	Released: February 27, 2019 (JPN); Label: Toy's Factory; Formats: CD, CD+DVD, digital download	1	JPN: 88,967	RIAJ: Gold
Eye	Released: February 27, 2019 (JPN); Label: Toy's Factory; Formats: CD, CD+DVD, digital download	2	JPN: 85,165	RIAJ: Gold
Scent of Memory	Released: July 7, 2021 (JPN); Label: Virgin Music; Formats: CD, CD+DVD, digital download	3		
Nautilus	Released: March 13, 2024 (JPN); Label: Universal Music; Formats: CD, CD+DVD, digital download	2	JPN: 53,828	
End of the World
Chameleon	Released: November 27, 2020 (JPN); Label: Land Music; Formats: CD, LP, digital download	6	JPN: 18,751	

=== Compilation albums ===
List compilation of albums, with selected chart positions, sales and certification
Title	Details	Peak chart positions	Sales	Certifications
Title	Details	JPN	Sales	Certifications
Sekai no Owari 2010–2019	Released: February 10, 2021 (JPN); Label: Toy's Factory; Formats: CD, CD+DVD, digital download	1	JPN: 101,833	RIAJ: Gold

== Extended plays ==
List of Extended plays
Title	Details
Sekai no Owari	Released: 2009 (JPN); Label: Self-released; Formats: CD

== Singles ==
=== As lead artist ===
==== Sekai no Owari ====
List of singles, with selected chart positions, showing year released, certification and album name
Title	Year	Peak chart positions			Certifications	Album
Title	Year	JPN	JPN Hot	WW	Certifications	Album
"Maboroshi no Inochi" (幻の命)	2010	—	67 (Note: Charted during the release of Earth.)	—		Earth
"Tenshi to Akuma" (天使と悪魔)	2010	8	5	—		Entertainment
"Fantasy" (ファンタジー)	2010	8	71	—		Entertainment
"Kachōfūgetsu" (花鳥風月) (Note: "Kachōfūgetsu", "Fushichō" and "Never Ending World" were released as a triple A-side under title Inori.)	2011	13	5 (Note: As a single not directly titled after a song, Inori did not chart on the Billboard Japan Hot 100, however peaked at number 11 on the Hot Single Sales sub-chart.)	—		Entertainment
"Fushichō" (不死鳥)	2011	13	33	—		Entertainment
"Never Ending World"	2011	13	— (Note: Charted at number 91 on the Radio Songs sub-chart.)	—		Entertainment
"Starlight Parade" (スターライトパレード)	2011	16	10	—	RIAJ: Platinum (st.)	Entertainment
"Nemuri Hime" (眠り姫)	2012	4	5	—	RIAJ: Platinum (st.)	Entertainment
"RPG"	2013	2	1	—	RIAJ: Gold (phy.); 2× Platinum (dig.); 2× Platinum (st.)	Tree
"Snow Magic Fantasy" (スノーマジックファンタジー)	2014	1	1	—	RIAJ: Gold (phy.); Gold (dig.)	Tree
"Honō to Mori no Carnival" (炎と森のカーニバル)	2014	2	1	—	RIAJ: Gold (phy.); Gold (dig.); Gold (st.)	Tree
"Dragon Night"	2014	4	2	—	RIAJ: Gold (phy.); 2× Platinum (dig.); Platinum (st.)	Tree
"Anti-Hero"	2015	2	2	—	RIAJ: Gold (phy.); Gold (dig.)	Eye
"SOS"	2015	1	1	—	RIAJ: Gold (phy.)	Eye
"Present" (プレゼント)	2015	1	52	—	RIAJ: Gold (phy.)	Sekai no Owari 2010–2019
"Hey Ho"	2016	3	5	—	RIAJ: Gold (phy.)	Lip
"Rain"	2017	2	2	—	RIAJ: Gold (phy.); Platinum (dig.); Platinum (st.)	Lip
"Sasanqua" (サザンカ)	2018	4	4	—	RIAJ: Gold (dig.); Platinum (st.)	Lip
"Umbrella"	2020	3	10	—		Scent of Memory
"Dropout"	2020	3	36	—		Scent of Memory
"Silent"	2020	4	4	— (Note: "Silent" did not enter the Billboard Global 200, but peaked at number 88 on the Global Excl. US.)	RIAJ: Gold (dig.); 2× Platinum (st.)	Scent of Memory
"Diary"	2021	3	39	—		Nautilus
"Habit"	2022	4	1	90	RIAJ: Platinum (dig.); 3× Platinum (st.)	Nautilus
"Saraba" (サラバ)	2023	3	64	—		Nautilus
"Turquoise" (ターコイズ)	2023	3	20	—		Nautilus
"Butterfly Effect" (バタフライエフェクト)	2023	3	—	—		Nautilus
"Robo"	2023	—	85	—		Nautilus
"The Peak" (最高到達点)	2023	—	13	—	RIAJ: Gold (dig.); 2× Platinum (st.)	Nautilus
"Time Machine" (タイムマシン)	2024	—	21	—		Nautilus
"Romantic"	2024	—	35	—	RIAJ: Gold (st.)	Non-album singles
"Kohaku" (琥珀)	2025	5	42	—		Non-album singles
"Zukan" (図鑑)	2025	5	71	—		Non-album singles
"Stella"	2026	6	30	—		Non-album singles
"—" denotes items that did not chart or items that were ineligible to chart because no physical edition was released.

==== End of the World ====
List of singles, with selected chart positions, showing year released and album name
Title	Year	Album
"One More Night"	2016	Non-album singles
"Stargazer"	2018	Non-album singles
"Lost" (featuring Clean Bandit)	2019	Chameleon
"Over" (featuring Gabrielle Aplin)	2020	Chameleon
"Forever" (featuring Niki)	2020	Chameleon
"Silver Lining" (with Tokyo Machine)	2021	Non-album singles
"In My Dream"	2021	Non-album singles
"End of the World" (with Steve Aoki)	2021	Non-album singles

=== As featured artist ===
List of singles as featured artist, with selected chart positions, showing year released and album name
Title	Year	Peak chart positions	Album
Title	Year	JPN Hot	Album
"Tokyo" (Owl City featuring Sekai no Owari)	2014	25	Mobile Orchestra

=== Promotional singles ===
List of promotional single, with selected chart positions, showing year released and album name
Title	Year	Peak chart positions	Certifications	Album
Title	Year	JPN Hot	Certifications	Album
Sekai no Owari
"Nijiiro no Sensō" (虹色の戦争)	2010	36	RIAJ: Platinum (st.)	Earth
"Tonight"	2010	—		Entertainment
"Death Disco"	2013	20		Tree
"Mermaid Rhapsody" (マーメイドラプソディー)	2015	18		Tree
"Mr. Heartache"	2015	—		Lip
"Illumination" (イルミネーション)	2019	7		Lip
"Yokohama Blues"	2019	39		Lip
"Love Song"	2019	41		Eye
"Food"	2019	—		Eye
"Mitsu no Tsuki (For the Film)" (蜜の月 -for the film-)	2019	44		Non-album single
"Birdman" (バードマン)	2021	44		Scent of Memory
End of the World
"Rollerskates"	2020	—		Chameleon
"—" denotes items that did not chart.

== Collaborations ==
List of collaborations, with selected chart positions, showing year released and album name
Title	Year	Peak chart positions		Album
Title	Year	JPN	JPN Hot	Album
Sekai no Owari
"Kanashimi no Kasa" (悲しみの傘) (with Yuzu)	2017	—	—	Yuzu Iroha 1997-2007
"Fukurō no Koe ga Kikoeru" (フクロウの声が聞こえる) (with Kenji Ozawa)	2017	6	8	So kakkoii Pluriverse
End of the World
"Sleeping Beauty" (with Epik High)	2018	—	—	Non-album single
"—" denotes items that did not chart or items that were ineligible to chart because no physical edition was released.

== Other charted songs ==
List of other charted songs, with selected chart positions, showing year released and album name
Title	Year	Peak chart positions	Certifications	Album
Title	Year	JPN Hot	Certifications	Album
"Pierrot" (ピエロ)	2014	74		"Honō to Mori no Carnival"
"Magic"	2014	43	RIAJ: Gold (st.)	"Dragon Night"
"Error"	2016	95		"Hey Ho"
"Shiori" (栞)	2024	32		Moshimo Umarekawattanara Sotto Konna Koe ni Natte
"Saidai Kōyakusū" (最大公約数)	2025	11		Dear Jubilee: Radwimps Tribute

== Video albums ==
List of video albums, with selected chart positions
Title	Details	Peak chart positions	
Title	Details	JPN DVD	JPN BD
2010.12.23 Shibuya C.C. Lemon Hall	Released: June 15, 2011 (JPN); Label: Lastrum; Formats: DVD	16	—
Arena Tour 2013 Entertainment in Kokuritsu Yoyogi Daiichi Taiikukan (ARENA TOUR 2013 ENTERTAINMENT in 国立代々木第一体育館)	Released: July 17, 2013 (JPN); Label: Toy's Factory; Formats: DVD	2	—
Honō to Mori no Carnival in 2013 (炎と森のカーニバル in 2013)	Released: April 9, 2014 (JPN); Label: Toy's Factory; Formats: DVD	1	—
Tokyo Fantasy Sekai no Owari	Released: April 15, 2015 (JPN); Label: Toy's Factory; Formats: DVD, Blu-ray	6	3
Twilight City at Nissan Stadium	Released: February 17, 2016 (JPN); Label: Toy's Factory; Formats: DVD, Blu-ray	2	2
The Dinner	Released: January 17, 2017 (JPN); Label: Toy's Factory; Formats: DVD, Blu-ray	2	4
Tarkus	Released: March 7, 2018 (JPN); Label: Toy's Factory; Formats: DVD, Blu-ray	2	3
Colors	Released: February 5, 2020 (JPN); Label: Toy's Factory; Formats: DVD, Blu-ray	1	6
"—" denotes items that were not released in Blu-ray format.
