= List of Oricon number-one singles of 2014 =

The highest-selling singles in Japan are ranked in the weekly Oricon Singles Chart, which is published by Oricon Style magazine. The data are compiled by Oricon based on each singles' weekly physical sales. This list includes the singles that reached the number one place on that chart in 2014.

== Chart history ==
Issue date	Song	Artist(s)	Sales	Ref.
January 6	"Ride With Me"	Hey! Say! JUMP	190,000	
January 13	"101-Kai-me no noroi" (１０１回目の呪い)	Golden Bomber		
January 20	"Tomonoura Bojō"	Misaki Iwasa	20,139	
January 27	"Hibiki"	Kanjani Eight	263,553	
February 3	"Snow Magic Fantasy"	Sekai no Owari	100,000	
February 10	"Egao no Kimi wa Taiyō sa / Kimi no Kawari wa Iyashinai / What is Love?"	Morning Musume '14	149,361	
February 17	"AinoArika/Aisureba Motto Happy Life"	Hey! Say! JUMP	236,027	
February 24	"Bittersweet"	Arashi	591,847	
March 3	"King of Otoko"	Kanjani Eight	389,313	
March 10	"Mae shika Mukanee"	AKB48	1,153,906	
March 17	"Hikari no Signal"	Kis-My-Ft2	244,808	
March 24	"Sakura, Minnade Tabeta"	HKT48	327,815	
March 31	"Mirai to wa?"	SKE48	503,917	
April 7	"Takane no Ringo"	NMB48	451,335	
April 14	"Kizuitara Kataomoi"	Nogizaka46	546,832	
April 21	"Yes We Are" / "Koko Kara"	SMAP	168,000	
April 28	"Toki o Koe Sora o Koe / Password is 0"	Morning Musume '14	119,409	
May 5	"Eejanaika"	Johnny's WEST	307,948	
May 12	"Guts!"	Arashi	604,654	
May 19	"Naite mo Iin Da yo"	Momoiro Clover Z	86,880	
May 26	"Labrador Retriever"	AKB48	1,786,825	
June 2	"Daremo Shiranai"	Arashi	525,055	
June 9	"In Fact"	KAT-TUN	160,192	
June 16	"One (For the Win)"	News	199,007	
June 23	"Hot Sun"	Kim Hyun-joong		
June 30	"Ryusei"	Sandaime J Soul Brothers from Exile Tribe	100,000	
July 7	"Omoidama"	Kanjani Eight	207,240	
July 14	"Natsu no Free & Easy"	Nogizaka46	526,564	
July 21	"Top of the World" / "Amazing Discovery"	SMAP	167,000	
July 28	"New Horizon"	Exile	147,572	
August 4	"Bukiyō Taiyō"	SKE48	461,539	
August 11	"ER2"	Eightranger	241,824	
August 18	"Another Future"	Kis-My-Ft2	263,615	
August 25	"The Revolution"	Exile Tribe	573,268	
September 1	"Kokoro no Placard"	AKB48	1,058,059	
September 8	"Weekender"	Hey! Say! JUMP	214,581	
September 15	"Tokyo Victory"	Southern All Stars		
September 22	"The Revolution"	Exile Tribe	(See Above)	
September 29	"Hikaeme I Love You!"	HKT48	308,251	
October 6	"Never Give Up"	Sexy Zone	347,737	
October 13	"Nandome no Aozora ka?"	Nogizaka46	578,174	
October 20	"Ittajanaika/CloveR"	Kanjani Eight	308,369	
October 27	"Sky's the Limit"	V6		
November 10	"Rashikunai"	NMB48	449,983	
November 17	"Key with No Box"	KinKi Kids	173,000	
November 24	"Kimi ni Hitomebore"	Sexy Zone	347,747	
December 1	"Kibōteki Refrain"	AKB48	1,156,706	
December 8	"Gamushara Kōshinkyoku"	Kanjani Eight	201,022	
December 22	"12 Gatsu no Kangarū"	SKE48	386,495	
December 29	"Mamacita (Ayaya)"	Super Junior	67,721	

== See also ==
- 2014 in Japanese music
