= List of Hot 100 number-one singles of 2014 (Japan) =

This is a list of number one singles on the Billboard Japan Hot 100 chart in Japan in 2014. The week's most popular songs in Japan, ranked by the Hanshin Corporation and based on radio airplay measured by Plantech and sales data as compiled by SoundScan Japan.

== Chart history ==
Issue date	Song	Artist(s)	Ref.
January 13	"Ride with Me"	Hey! Say! JUMP	
January 20	"Ichi, Ni, San de Janpu" (イチ、ニッ、サンでジャンプ)	Good Morning America	
January 27	"Hibiki"	Kanjani Eight	
February 3	"Snow Magic Fantasy" (スノーマジックファンタジ)	Sekai no Owari	
February 10	"Snow Magic Fantasy" (スノーマジックファンタジ)	Sekai no Owari	
February 17	"AinoArika"	Hey! Say! JUMP	
February 24	"Bittersweet"	Arashi	
March 3	"King of Otoko" (キングオブ男!)	Kanjani Eight	
March 10	"Mae shika Mukanee"	AKB48	
March 17	"Hikari no Signal"	Kis-My-Ft2	
March 24	"Sakura, Minnade Tabeta"	HKT48	
March 31	"Mirai to wa?"	SKE48	
April 7	"Takane no Ringo"	NMB48	
April 14	"Kizuitara Kataomoi"	Nogizaka46	
April 21	"Yes we are"	SMAP	
April 28	"Honō to Mori no Carnival"	Sekai no Owari	
May 5	"Eejanaika"	Johnny's West	
May 12	"Guts"	Arashi	
May 19	"Guts"	Arashi	
May 26	"King & Queen & Joker"	Sexy Zone	
June 2	"Labrador Retriever"	AKB48	
June 9	"Daremo Shiranai"	Arashi	
June 16	"In Fact"	KAT-TUN	
June 23	"Sweat"	TVXQ	
June 30	"Nanokame no ketsui (7日目の決意)"	Uverworld	
July 7	"R.Y.U.S.E.I."	Sandaime J Soul Brothers from Exile Tribe	
July 14	"Omoidama"	Kanjani Eight	
July 21	"Natsu no Free & Easy"	Nogizaka46	
July 28	"Top of the World"	SMAP	
August 4	""New Horizon""	Exile	
August 11	"Bukiyō Taiyō"	SKE48	
August 18	"ER2"	Eightranger	
August 25	"Another Future"	Kis-My-Ft2	
September 1	"Ignite"	Eir Aoi	
September 8	"Kokoro no Placard"	AKB48	
September 15	"Weekender"	Hey! Say! Jump	
September 22	"Tokyo Victory"	Southern All Stars	
September 29	"Midaretemina"	2PM	
October 6	"Hikaeme I Love You!"	HKT48	
October 13	"Never Give Up"	Sexy Zone	
October 20	"Nandome no Aozora ka?"	Nogizaka46	
October 27	"Ittajanaika/CloveR"	Kanjani Eight	
November 3	"Sky's the Limit"	V6	
November 10	"Geragerapo in Festival"	Music	
November 17	"Time Works Wonders"	TVXQ	
November 24	"Key with No Box"	KinKi Kids	
December 1	"Footsteps Be Strong"	Mr. Children	
December 8	"Kibōteki Refrain"	AKB48	
December 15	"Gamushara Kōshinkyoku"	Kanjani Eight	
December 22	"O.R.I.O.N."	Sandaime J Soul Brothers from Exile Tribe	
December 29	"O.R.I.O.N."	Sandaime J Soul Brothers from Exile Tribe	
