= Tsuyoku Tsuyoku Tsuyoku =

2015 single by Kanjani Eight

Song by Kanjani Eight

from the album Kanjani8 no Genki ga deru CD
- Released: June 3, 2015
- Genre: J-pop
- Length: 2:09
- Label: Infinity Records
- Songwriter: Toshitsugu Maehara

Tsuyoku Tsuyoku Tsuyoku (強く 強く 強く) is the 32nd single released by Japanese boy band Kanjani Eight. It was released on 3 June 2015 on the band's Infinity Records label. It was number 1 on the weekly Oricon chart for the week of 1–7 June 2015. The song spent a total of 11 weeks in the Oricon chart and was the second-best selling single of June 2015 with 169,881 copies. It also reached number one on the Billboard Japan Hot 100. The song was used as the opening theme song on the Nippon Television drama series Do S Deka. The song was also included in the band's November 2015 album Kanjani no Genki ga Deru CD (関ジャニ∞の元気が出るCD‼).

== Track listing ==
Standard release

1. Tsuyoku Tsuyoku Tsuyoku
2. Extend!
3. Can't U See?
4. Gamushara Kōshinkyoku "Kanjanism" Remix (がむしゃら行進曲“関ジャニズム”Remix)

Limited release version (including DVD)

1. Tsuyoku Tsuyoku Tsuyoku
2. Extend!
3. Omoidama "Kanjanism" Remix (オモイダマ“関ジャニズム”Remix)
