= Christofer Erixon =

Swedish songwriter, composer and music producer

- Also known as: Chris Hope
- Born: 9 October 1987 (age 39); Trollhättan
- Genre: Pop
- Occupations: Composer, Songwriter, Music producer
- Years active: 2012–present

Christofer Erixon, also known as Chris Hope, is a multi million selling Swedish songwriter, composer and music producer based in Trollhättan, Sweden. Erixon has written songs for Asian artists like Arashi, Sandaime J Soul Brothers, Kis-My-Ft2, Generations and Hey! Say! JUMP In 2013 he contributed with four songs to the Arashi album Love, which won album of the year in Japan and became the number one selling album in the world when released.

== Selected discography ==
| TITLE | ARTIST | FROM |
|---|---|---|
| Breathless | Arashi | Love A-side single |
| Dance In The Dark | Arashi | Love |
| Hit The Floor | Arashi | Love |
| FUNKY | Arashi | Love |
| Daremo Shiranai | Arashi | The Digitalian A-side single |
| Mircale Summer | Arashi | B-side single |
| Make A Wish | Arashi | Japonism |
| Up to you | Arashi | Popcorn |
| I Say | Arashi | B-side single |
| STORM RIDERS feat. SLASH | J Soul Brothers | The JSB Legacy A-side single |
| BREAK OF DAWN | J Soul Brothers | The JSB Legacy |
| Waking Me Up | J Soul Brothers | Blue Impact B-side single |
| S.O.S | Kis-My-Ft2 | Hit! Hit! Hit! A-side single |
| Eternal Mind | Kis-My-Ft2 | YOSHIO - New Member |
| Jet! Set!! Go!!! | Kis-My-Ft2 | Good Ikuze! |
| Perfect World | Kis-My-Ft2 | Another Future B-side single |
| Gravity | Kis-My-Ft2 | I SCREAM A-side single |
| Welcome | Kis-My-Ft2 | B-side single |
| L.O.V.E. | Kis-My-Ft2 | A-side single |
| Higher Ground | Exile Tribe | HIGH&LOW Original Best Album |
| Run This Town | Generations from Exile Tribe | HIGH&LOW Original Best Album |
| WARNING | RAMPAGE from Exile Tribe | HIGH&LOW Original Best Album |
| LIGHTNING | RAMPAGE from Exile Tribe | A-side single |
| AGEHA | Generations from Exile Tribe | Speedster A-side single |
| All For You | Generations from Exile Tribe | Speedster A-side single |
| Evergreen | Generations from Exile Tribe | Speedster A-side single |
| Transform | Generations from Exile Tribe | Speedster |
| Sing It Loud | Generations from Exile Tribe | Generation Ex A-side single |
| Higher | Generations from Exile Tribe | Generation Ex |
| Pump It | Generations from Exile Tribe | Generation Ex |
| Revolver | Generations from Exile Tribe | Generation Ex |
| Never Let You Go | Generations from Exile Tribe | Generation Ex A-side single |
| Make It Real | Generations from Exile Tribe | Generation Ex |
| I Remember | Generations from Exile Tribe | Generation Ex |
| Go On | Generations from Exile Tribe | Generations |
| Into You | Generations from Exile Tribe | Generations |
| Love You More | Generations from Exile Tribe | Generations A-side single |
| Fallin' | Generations from Exile Tribe | Generations |
| Silver Moon | Sexy Zone | One Sexy Zone |
| Onaji Sora No Shita | Sexy Zone | B-side single |
| Celebration! | Sexy Zone | Welcome To Sexy Zone |
| Sweety Girl | Sexy Zone | Welcome To Sexy Zone |
| Make My Day | Sexy Zone | Welcome To Sexy Zone |
| But... | Sexy Zone | Welcome To Sexy Zone |
| Otoko never give up | Sexy Zone | Sexy Power3 A-side single |
| Ippozutsu 〜Walk On The Wild Side〜 | Sexy Zone | Sexy Power3 |
| King & Queen & Joker | Sexy Zone | Sexy Power3 A-side single |
| Butsukacchauyo | Sexy Zone | Sexy Second |
| ROCK THA TOWN | Sexy Zone | A-side single |
| Forever Gold | Sexy Zone | The・highlight |
| Crazy Girl | Tackey & Tsubasa | TEN |
| Setsunasa Hikikaeni | Hey Say JUMP! | S3ART |
| Compass Rose | Hey Say JUMP! | S3ART |
| Reload | Hey Say JUMP! | S3ART |
| Kimi Attraction | Hey Say JUMP! | A-side single |
| Give Me Love | Hey Say JUMP! | A-side single |
| Beginning Of The Second Age | Exile The Second | The II Age |
| SUPER FLY | Exile The Second | A-side single |
| Angel Eyes | A1B4 | B-side single |
| Greedier | NEWS | NEWS |
| Boku Tachi No Asu | V6 | B-side single |
| FIRST CHRISTMAS | EXILE ATSUSHI | Love Ballade |
| Cannonball | Kanjani Eight | B-side single |
| Boku Tachi No Birthday | Yuma Nakayama | Chapter 1 |
| In The Name Of Love | Yuma Nakayama | Chapter 1 |
| Rock Your World | ABC-Z | Moonlight walker B-side single |
| Great5 | ABC-Z | Hanakotoba Limited First Edition with CD |
| Triple Lucky!!! | ABC-Z | VS 5 |
| Get up! | Hashimoto VS Goseki(ABC-Z) | VS 5 |
| Crush On You | ABC-Z | Going with Zephyr |
| Only You | Johnny's West | B-side single |
| LOVE YOU DOWN | Shokichi / Doberman Infinity | Doberman Infinity #PRLG |
| 王様 KING | Mr KING | Album |
| REWIND | Happiness | A-side single |
