= EIIR =

EIIR or variation, may refer to:

- EIIR, royal cypher of Elizabeth II derived from Latin "Elizabeth II Regina"
- European Institute for International Law and International Relations
- Inisheer Aerodrome (ICAO airport code: EIIR), Inisheer Island, Ireland

== See also ==
- Elizabeth II (disambiguation)
- ER2 (disambiguation)
- EIR (disambiguation)
