= Japonism (album) =

Studio album by Arashi
- Released: October 21, 2015
- Recorded: 2014–2015
- Genres: Pop; R&B
- Length: 86:37 (Regular Edition); 69:39 (Limited Edition); 121:10 (Yoitoko Limited Edition)
- Languages: Japanese; English
- Label: J Storm
- Producer: Julie K.

Arashi chronology
The Digitalian (2014)	Japonism (2015)	Are You Happy? (2016)

Singles from Japonism
- 1. "Sakura" Released: February 25, 2015; 2. "Aozora no Shita, Kimi no Tonari" Released: May 13, 2015

Japonism is the fourteenth studio album of the Japanese idol group Arashi. The album was released on October 21, 2015 under their record label J Storm in three editions: a first press/limited edition, a Yoitoko limited edition, and a regular edition. The first press edition comes with an 84-page photo lyrics booklet and bonus DVD with the music video and making-of for the album's lead track, "Kokoro no Sora". The Yoitoko limited edition comes with a 32-page lyrics booklet, and the regular edition comes with a 36-page lyrics booklet. The album sold over 820,000 copies in its first week and topped the Oricon charts for two consecutive weeks. With more than 1,000,000 copies sold, the album was certified for Million by the Recording Industry Association of Japan (RIAJ). On December 23, 2015, Oricon ranked Japonism as the best-selling album of 2015 in Japan. On February 27, 2016, Japonism was awarded Album of the Year in the 2016 Japan Gold Disc Awards.

It was released digitally on February 7, 2020.

== Album information ==
The first press edition contains a CD with sixteen tracks and the Yoitoko edition contains a CD with seventeen tracks. The regular edition contains a CD with twenty tracks. The first press edition comes with an 84-page photo lyrics booklet and a bonus DVD with the music video and making of for "Kokoro no Sora", while the Yoitoko limited edition comes with a 32-page lyrics booklet, a bonus track, and an original talk track "Arajapo Talk". The regular edition comes with a 36-page lyrics booklet and four bonus tracks. The album jacket cover for the Yoitoko and regular editions are the same. The first press edition has a different jacket cover.

=== Songs ===
In Japonism, Arashi expresses their interpretations of the "wonderfulness of Japan". The album showcases Arashi's ambitious challenging spirit and continuous evolution. The lead track "Kokoro no Sora" was composed by Tomoyasu Hotei, who is based in London, with the theme "Japan seen from the outside" in mind. Described as a "passionate and manly song", Arashi sings to a fast-paced Hotei sound, where a battle between Arashi, Hotei, and Japanese instruments take place. The album includes a cover of Shonentai's "Nihon Yoitoko Maka Fushigi".

Japonism includes two of the group's previously released singles: "Sakura" and "Aozora no Shita, Kimi no Tonari". This album also includes fourteen new songs plus five of each member's solo songs. It also includes their previously unreleased song "Furusato" which they have sung regularly since 2010.

"Sakura" was used as the theme song for the drama Ouroborous, starring actors Toma Ikuta and Shun Oguri. This is the first time Arashi has provided a theme song for a drama that did not star one of its members. "Aozora no Shita, Kimi no Tonari" was used as the theme song for the drama Yokoso, Wagaya E, which stars Arashi member Masaki Aiba.

== Promotion ==
To support their new album, Arashi performed a live tour, ARASHI LIVE TOUR 2015 Japonism, performing at all the major dome stadiums in Japan. They had 17 performances beginning on November 6 at the Nagoya Dome, followed by Sapporo Dome on November 8, Kyocera Osaka Dome on November 26, Fukuoka Dome on December 17, and Tokyo Dome on December 23, 2015.

== Track listing ==
CD 1
No.	Title	Lyrics	Music	Arrangement	Length
1.	"Sakura"	eltvo	eltvo	Hirofumi Sasaki	4:39
2.	"Kokoro no Sora" (心の空)	Tomoyasu Hotei; Sho Sakurai	Hotei	Hotei	4:33
3.	"Kimi e no Omoi" (君への想い)	wonder note; Macoto56; Sakurai	wonder note	Tomoki Ishizuka	4:53
4.	"Don't You Love Me?" (Jun Matsumoto solo)	wonder note; paddy	wonder note; takarot	Ishizuka	4:00
5.	"Miyabi-night"	Macoto56; AKJ & ASIL	AKJ & ASIL	A.K.Janeway	4:37
6.	"Mikazuki" (三日月)	youth case	A-bee	A-bee	4:30
7.	"Bolero!"	Sakra	Sakra	Slice of Life	3:38
8.	"Mr. Funk" (Masaki Aiba solo)	youth case; Shigeo	Ricky Hanley; Daniel Sherman	metropolitan digital clique	4:45
9.	"Akatsuki" (暁, Satoshi Ohno solo)	s-Tnk	Kazumi Mitome	Mitome	4:13
10.	"Aozora no Shita, Kimi no Tonari" (青空の下、キミのとなり)	wonder note; s-Tnk	Gigi; wonder note	metropolitan digital clique	4:04
11.	"Rolling Days" (Sho Sakurai solo)	Octobar; Sakurai	Octobar	pieni tonttu	5:05
12.	"In the Room" (イン・ザ・ルーム)	Takashi Ogawa; Sakurai	Jeremy Hammond	Hammond	3:18
13.	"Masquerade" (マスカレード)	Hydrant	Hydrant	Motoki Funayama	4:50
14.	"Music" (Kazunari Ninomiya solo)	Akira	Takahiro Furukawa	Taku Yoshioka	3:38
15.	"Tsutaetai Koto" (伝えたいこと)	ASIL; s-Tnk	Figge Boström; Susumu Kawaguchi	pieni tonttu	4:39
16.	"Japonesque"	MiNE; R.P.P.	sk-etch; MiNE	ha-j; sk-etch	4:11

CD 2: Regular edition
No.	Title	Lyrics	Music	Arrangement	Length
1.	"Bokura ga Tsunaideiku" (僕らがつないでいく)	SQUAREF; John World	Pippi Svensson; Josef Melin	BJ Khan	4:25
2.	"The Deep End"	100+	Steven Lee; Drew Ryan Scott; Andreas Oberg	A.K.Janeway	3:27
3.	"Make a Wish"	Sachiko Inamura	sk-etch; Shu Kanematsu; BEAT; ROLF	Sasaki	4:24
4.	"Furusato" (ふるさと)	Kundō Koyama	youth case	Sachiko Miyano	4:41
Total length:					86:37

CD 2 Yoitoko limited edition
No.	Title	Lyrics	Music	Arrangement	Length
1.	"Nihon Yoitoko Makafushigi" (日本よいとこ摩訶不思議, Shonentai cover)	Yoshio Nomura	Nomura	Sasaki	2:55
2.	"Arajapo Talk" (アラジャポ・トーク, Original Talk Track)				48:36
Total length:					121:10

DVD limited edition
No.	Title	Length
1.	"Kokoro no Sora (video clip + making)" (心の空（ビデオ・クリップ＋メイキング）)

== Chart performance ==
The album debuted at number one on the Oricon daily album chart selling 412,826 copies upon its release and selling over 820,000 copies by the end of the week, topping the Oricon weekly album chart. The album maintained its number-one spot on the Oricon weekly album chart selling 56,890 copies in its second week and stayed in the top ten for six consecutive weeks. The album placed second on Billboard Japan's yearly top albums list and first on Oricon's yearly album chart, making it the best-selling album of 2015 in Japan. This makes Arashi the first and only solo or group artist to reach number one five times on the yearly charts, beating Hikaru Utada's 2004 record of four number one albums on the yearly charts.

"Japonism" sold 3,513 copies in its twelfth week which pushed the overall sales for the album past the one million mark, making "Japonism" Arashi's third million-selling album after All the Best! 1999–2009 and Boku no Miteiru Fūkei. It also marks the first time in three years and seven months a male artist has sold over one million copies of their album (since Mr Children's Mr. Children 2001–2005 ＜micro＞ in 2012). With more than 1,000,000 copies sold, "Japonism" was certified for Million by the Recording Industry Association of Japan (RIAJ).

== Charts and certifications ==
=== Weekly charts ===
Chart (2015)	Peak position
Japan (Oricon Albums Chart)	1
Japan (Billboard Japan Hot Albums)	1
Japan (Billboard Japan Top Album Sales)	1
South Korea (Gaon Album Chart)	59
South Korea (Gaon International Album Chart)	10
Taiwan (G-Music East Asian Chart) (Note: Position was taken from 2015 week 47.)	2
Chart (2016)	Peak position
Japan (Oricon Albums Chart)	19
Japan (Billboard Japan Hot Albums)	11
Japan (Billboard Japan Top Album Sales)	9

=== Year-end charts ===
Chart (2016)	Peak position
Japan (Oricon Albums Chart)	1
Japan (Billboard Japan Hot Albums)	4
Japan (Billboard Japan Top Albums Sales)	2
Taiwan (G-Music East Asian Chart)	15

=== Sales and certifications ===
Region	Certification	Certified units/sales
Japan (RIAJ)	Million	1,023,278

== Awards ==
- The album won Album of the Year and was listed as one of the Best 5 Albums for the 30th Japan Gold Disc Awards.

== Release history ==
Country	Release date	Label	Format	Catalog
Japan	October 21, 2015	J Storm	CD+DVD	JACA-5480-5481
Japan	October 21, 2015	J Storm	2CD	JACA-5482-5483
Japan	October 21, 2015	J Storm	2CD	JACA-5484-5485
South Korea	November 11, 2015	S.M. Entertainment	CD+DVD	SMKJT0593/B
South Korea	November 11, 2015	S.M. Entertainment	2CD	SMKJT0594
South Korea	November 11, 2015	S.M. Entertainment	2CD	SMKJT0595
Taiwan	November 11, 2015	Avex Asia	CD+DVD	JAJCD26025/A
Taiwan	November 11, 2015	Avex Asia	2CD	JAJCD26025/B
Taiwan	November 11, 2015	Avex Asia	2CD	JAJCD26025/6
