= The Digitalian =

Studio album by Arashi
- Released: October 22, 2014
- Recorded: 2013–2014
- Genre: Pop, R&B
- Length: 72:30
- Language: Japanese, English
- Label: J Storm
- Producer: Julie K.

Arashi chronology
Love (2013)	The Digitalian (2014)	Japonism (2015)

Singles from The Digitalian
- 1. "Bittersweet" Released: February 12, 2014; 2. "Guts!" Released: April 30, 2014; 3. "Daremo Shiranai" Released: May 28, 2014

The Digitalian (stylized as THE DIGITALIAN) is the thirteenth studio album of the Japanese boy band Arashi. The album was released on October 22, 2014 under their record label J Storm in two editions: a first press/limited edition and a regular edition. The regular edition comes with a 32-page photo lyrics booklet, while the limited edition comes with a 60-page photo lyrics booklet and a bonus DVD with a music video and making-of for "Zero-G". The album sold over 660,000 copies in its first week and became the third best selling album of 2014 in Japan. With more than 780,000 units sold, the album was certified for Triple Platinum by the Recording Industry Association of Japan (RIAJ).

It was released digitally on February 7, 2020.

== Album information ==
The first press edition contains a CD with sixteen tracks and the regular edition contains a CD with seventeen tracks. The first press edition comes with a 60-page photo lyrics booklet and a bonus DVD with the music video and making of for "Zero-G", while the regular edition comes with a 32-page lyrics booklet and a bonus track. The album jacket cover for both versions are also different.

=== Songs ===
"The Digitalian" includes three of the group's previously released singles: "Bittersweet", "Guts!", and "Daremo Shiranai". This album also includes nine new songs plus five of each member's solo songs.

Three tracks of this album were used as the theme song for dramas starred by the Arashi members. These songs are "Bittersweet", "Guts!", and "Daremo Shiranai", used in dramas Shitsuren Chocolatier, Yowakutemo Katemasu, and Shinigami-kun, respectively.

== Promotion ==
To support their new album, Arashi performed a live tour, Arashi Live Tour 2014 The Digitalian, performing at all the major dome stadiums in Japan. They had 18 performances beginning on November 14 at the Fukuoka Dome, followed by Kyocera Osaka Dome on November 27, Nagoya Dome on December 5, Sapporo Dome on December 12, and Tokyo Dome on December 19, 2014.

== Track listing ==
No.	Title	Lyrics	Music	Arrangement	Length
1.	"Zero-G"	Shōta Kajigaya; Eltvo	Takuya Harada	Tomoki Ishizuka	3:57
2.	"Wonderful"	ASIL; Masa Fujise; John World; Squaref	James Winchester; Peter Boyes; Christopher Wortley	Slice of Life	3:41
3.	"Tell Me Why"	Squaref; mfmsiQ; World; Sho Sakurai	Andreas Johansson; Steven Lee	A.K.Janeway	4:30
4.	"Asterisk"	100+; Sakurai	100+	100+	4:36
5.	"Imaging Crazy" (Satoshi Ohno solo)	Curly; Furuha	Dyce Taylor; Jin Choi	Choi	3:42
6.	"Guts!"	Eltvo; s-Tnk	Sakra	Ishizuka	4:55
7.	"Disco Star" (Masaki Aiba solo)	Youth Case	Yasushi Watanabe	A.K.Janeway	3:53
8.	"Daremo Shiranai" (誰も知らない)	mfmsiQ; Squaref; World; Sakuta Masaya	Harada; Joakim Björnberg; Christofer Erixon; BJ Khan	Hirofumi Sasaki; BJ Khan	4:04
9.	"Trap"	Akira	Akira	Taku Yoshioka	3:23
10.	"Stay Gold" (Jun Matsumoto solo)	Macoto56; Jun Matsumoto	Shinnosuke	Shinnosuke; Pienu Tonttu; Captain B	4:29
11.	"Bittersweet"	100+	100+	Ishizuka	4:50
12.	"Merry Christmas" (メリークリスマス, Kazunari Ninomiya solo)	Kazunari Ninomiya; Takashi Ogawa	Ninomiya	Ha-j; Ninomiya	4:20
13.	"Kimi no Yume o Miteita" (キミの夢を見ていた)	Hydrant	Hydrant	Sasaki	4:53
14.	"One Step"	s-Tnk	Mats Tärnfors	Sasaki	4:44
15.	"Hey Yeah!" (Sho Sakurai solo)	Akira; Sakurai	Nao Tanaka	Hisashi Nawata	3:22
16.	"Hope in the Darkness"	Ogawa; Hydrant	David Keiffer Johnston; Wesley Steed; Sigurdur Kristinn Sigtryggsson pka Siggi	Metropolitan Digital Clique; A-bee
17.	"Take Off!!!!!" (Bonus track, regular edition only)	Sakurai	Stephan Elfgren	Elfgren	3:23
Total length:					71:26

== Release history ==
Country	Release date	Label
Japan	October 22, 2014	J Storm
South Korea	November 12, 2014	S.M. Entertainment
