= King of Otoko =

Single by Kanjani Eight
- Released: February 19, 2014 (Japan)

Kanjani Eight singles chronology
"Hibiki" (2014)	"King of Otoko" (2014)	"Omoidama" (2014)

"King of Otoko" (キング オブ 男！) is a single by Japanese boy band Kanjani Eight. It was released on February 19, 2014. It debuted in number one on the weekly Oricon Singles Chart and reached number one on the Billboard Japan Hot 100. It was the 17th best-selling single of the year in Japan, with 389,313 copies.
