= Tomonoura Bojō =

Single by Misaki Iwasa
- Released: January 8, 2014 (Japan)

Misaki Iwasa singles chronology
"Moshimo Watashi ga Sora ni Sundeitara" (2013)	"Tomonoura Bojō" (2014)

"Tomonoura Bojō" (鞆の浦慕情) is the 3rd single by Misaki Iwasa. It was released on January 8, 2014. It debuted in number one on the weekly Oricon Singles Chart. It has sold a total of 20,139 copies, as of July 28, 2014 (chart date).

The limited edition CD includes a cover version of the song Ihojin.
