= Eejanaika =

Ee ja nai ka was a complex of carnivalesque religious celebrations and communal activities, often understood as social/political protests, which occurred in many parts of Japan in 1867–1868.

Eejanaika or Eijanaika may refer to:

- Eijanaika (film)
- Eejanaika (roller coaster)
- "Eijanaika" (song)
