= Eye (Sekai no Owari album) =

Studio album by Sekai no Owari
- Released: February 27, 2019
- Genre: J-pop
- Language: Japanese
- Label: Toy's Factory

Sekai no Owari chronology
Lip (2019)	Eye (2019)	Chameleon (2019)

Singles from Tree
- 1. "Anti-Hero" Released: July 29, 2015; 2. "SOS" Released: September 25, 2015

Eye is the fifth studio album by Japanese rock band Sekai no Owari, released on February 27, 2019, by Toy's Factory. It was released simultaneously with the album Lip. The limited first run of the album contains a DVD with footage from the band's Insomnia Train outdoor concert tour. The band will tour in support of the albums from April 2019. It debuted at number two on the Japanese Oricon Albums Chart on March 6, behind Lip at number one.

== Background ==
The band recorded enough material across the four years from their previous album Tree (2015), so decided to release it across two separate albums, with Eye showcasing the band's "wild side", and Lip featuring the band's "signature pop" songs.

The songs "Anti-Hero", "SOS", "Stargazer" and "Re:set" were released prior to the album.

== Promotion ==
"Re:set" was used as the theme for the video game Catherine: Full Body.

== Track listing ==
No.	Title	Writer(s)	Producer(s)	Length
1.	"Love Song"	Fukase; Nakajin; Saori	Sekai no Owari; Takashi Asano	3:59
2.	"Blue Flower"	Fukase	Sekai no Owari	3:11
3.	"Anti-Hero"	Fukase; Nakajin	Sekai no Owari; Dan the Automator	3:34
4.	"Yozakura" (夜桜)	Fukase; Nakajin	Sekai no Owari; Neko Saito	3:50
5.	"Monsoon Night"	Fukase; Nakajin; Saori	Sekai no Owari; Marcel Prodan	3:38
6.	"Food"	Fukase	Sekai no Owari	2:43
7.	"SOS"	Fukase; Saori	Sekai no Owari; Ken Thomas	5:05
8.	"Re:set"	Fukase	Sekai no Owari	3:09
9.	"Doppelganger" (ドッペルゲンガー)	Nakajin	Sekai no Owari; Yuki Kishida	3:50
10.	"Eden" (エデン)	Fukase	Sekai no Owari	4:01
11.	"Subete ga Kowareta Yoru ni" (すべてが壊れた夜に)	Fukase	Sekai no Owari	4:40
12.	"Witch"	Fukase; Nakajin	Sekai no Owari	3:34
13.	"Stargazer" (スターゲイザー)	Fukase	Sekai no Owari	3:55
Total length:				49:09

Notes

- Nelson Babin-coy provided support as a consultant for English lyrics written in tracks 3, 5, and 7.

== Charts ==
=== Weekly charts ===
Chart (2019)	Peak position
Japanese Albums (Billboard Japan)	3
Japanese Albums (Oricon)	2

=== Year-end charts ===
Chart (2019)	Position
Japanese Albums (Oricon)	43
