= Snow Magic Fantasy =

Single by Sekai no Owari

from the album Tree
- Released: January 22, 2014 (Japan)
- Genre: J-pop
- Songwriter: Satoshi Fukase
- Producer: Sekai no Owari

Sekai no Owari singles chronology
"RPG" (2013)	"Snow Magic Fantasy" (2014)	"Honō to Mori no Carnival" (2014)

"Snow Magic Fantasy" (スノーマジックファンタジー) is a single by Japanese rock band Sekai no Owari. It was released on January 22, 2014. It debuted in number one on the weekly Oricon Singles Chart and also reached number one on the Billboard Japan Hot 100, where it stayed for two consecutive weeks.
