= Lip (album) =

Studio album by Sekai no Owari
- Released: February 27, 2019
- Genre: J-pop
- Language: Japanese
- Label: Toy's Factory
- Producer: Sekai no Owari; Takeshi Kobayashi; Adam Young; Udai Shika; Neko Saito; Yoichi Murata

Sekai no Owari chronology
Tree (2015)	Lip (2019)	Eye (2019)

Singles from Lip
- 1. "Mr.Heartache" Released: December 31, 2015; 2. "Hey Ho" Released: October 5, 2016; 3. "Rain" Released: July 5, 2017; 4. "Sasanqua" Released: February 28, 2018; 5. "Illumination" Released: October 11, 2018

Lip is the fourth studio album by Japanese rock band Sekai no Owari, released on February 27, 2019, by Toy's Factory. It was released simultaneously with the album Eye. The limited first run of the album contains a DVD featuring several of the band's music videos. The band will tour in support of the albums from April 2019. It debuted at number one on the Japanese Oricon Albums Chart on March 6.

== Background ==
The band recorded enough material across the four years from their previous album Tree (2015), so decided to divide the material onto two discs, with Lip featuring the band's "signature pop" songs, and Eye showcasing their "wild side".

The songs "Hey Ho", "Error", "Mr. Heartache", "Rain", "Sasanqua" and "Illumination" were released prior to the album, with music videos accompanying several of the songs.

== Promotion ==
"Illumination" was used as the theme song of the TV Asahi drama Legal V Ex-Lawyer Shoko Takanashi, while "Sasanqua" was used as the broadcast theme song of NHK's coverage of the 2018 Winter Paralympic Games.

== Track listing ==
No.	Title	Writer(s)	Producer(s)	Length
1.	"Yokohama Blues"	Fukase; Nakajin	Sekai no Owari	4:52
2.	"Rain"	Fukase; Nakajin; Saori	Sekai no Owari; Takeshi Kobayashi	5:10
3.	"Mr. Heartache"	Adam Young; Fukase; Nakajin	Sekai no Owari; Adam Young	5:09
4.	"Himawari" (向日葵)	Fukase; Nakajin	Sekai no Owari	4:27
5.	"Sasanqua" (サザンカ)	Fukase; Nakajin; Saori	Sekai no Owari; Kobayashi; Udai Shika	4:30
6.	"Senya Ichiya Monogatari" (千夜一夜物語)	Saori	Sekai no Owari; Neko Saito	5:07
7.	"Error"	Fukase; Nakajin; Saori	Sekai no Owari	3:29
8.	"Hey Ho"	Fukase; Nakajin; Saori	Sekai no Owari	5:02
9.	"Rafflesia" (ラフレシア)	Fukase; Nakajin	Sekai no Owari; Yoichi Murata	4:02
10.	"Goodbye"	Nakajin	Sekai no Owari	4:54
11.	"Missing"	Fukase; Saori	Sekai no Owari	4:13
12.	"Mitsu no Tsuki" (蜜の月)	Fukase	Sekai no Owari	4:20
13.	"Illumination" (イルミネーション)	Fukase; Nakajin; Saori	Sekai no Owari; Kobayashi; Shika	4:26
Total length:				59:41

Notes

- Nelson Babin-coy provided support as a consultant for English lyrics written in track 3.

== Charts ==
=== Weekly charts ===
Chart (2019)	Peak position
Japanese Albums (Billboard Japan)	2
Japanese Albums (Oricon)	1
South Korean Albums (Gaon)	72

=== Year-end charts ===
Chart (2019)	Position
Japanese Albums (Oricon)	39
