= Hikari no Signal =

2013 single by Kis-My-Ft2

Single by Kis-My-Ft2

from the album Kis-My-Journey
- B-side: "Zutto (You are my Everything)"; "Crush! Crush! Crush!"
- Released: March 5, 2014 (Japan)
- Genre: J-pop
- Label: Avex Trax

Kis-My-Ft2 singles chronology
"Snow Dome no Yakusoku/Luv Sick" (2013)	"Hikari no Signal" (2014)	"Another Future" (2014)

Music video
- "Hikari no Signal" on YouTube "Hikari no Signal" (animated version) on YouTube

"Hikari no Signal" (Japanese: 光のシグナル, Hepburn: Hikari no sigunaru) is the 10th single by Japanese boy band Kis-My-Ft2. It was used as a theme song for the film Doraemon: Nobita in the New Haunts of Evil ~ Peko and the Five Explorers ~, released on March 5, 2014.

The lyrics of this song were written in accordance with the film's content, and the song expresses the feelings of "the importance of friendship with friends" and "the desire to go with your friends."

On the first edition B, the members were depicted in anime on the cover jacket, and the animated version of the music video featured the animated members. This was the first attempt in the history of Doraemon animation.

== Chart performance ==
It debuted in number one on the weekly Oricon Singles Chart and reached number one on the Billboard Japan Hot 100. It was the 5th best-selling single in Japan in March 2014, with 237,696 copies. It was the 26th best-selling single of 2014 in Japan, with 244,808 copies.

== Track listing ==
=== CD ===
1. "Hikari no Signal" [4:27]
2. "Zutto (You are my Everything)" [4:30]
3. "Crush! Crush! Crush!"

=== DVD ===
- Limited First Edition A
1. "Hikari no Signal" (Music video)
2. "Hikari no Signal" (Music video Making Movie)
- Limited First Edition B
1. "Hikari no Signal" (Music video, Animated version)
2. Kis-My-Ft2 Special Interview
