= Calling / Breathless =

2013 single by Arashi

- Regular edition cover

Single by Arashi

from the album Love
- Released: March 6, 2013
- Recorded: 2013
- Genre: Pop
- Label: J Storm

Arashi singles chronology
"Your Eyes" (2012)	"Calling / Breathless" (2013)	"Endless Game" (2013)

"Calling" / "Breathless" is the 40th single released by Japanese boy band Arashi. "Calling" was used as the theme song for the drama Last Hope starring Arashi member Masaki Aiba. "Breathless" was used as the theme song for the movie Platina Data starring Arashi member Kazunari Ninomiya.

It debuted at number one on the Oricon Singles Chart. According to Oricon, this was the sixth best selling single of the year in Japan, with 881,192 copies.

== Single information ==
The single was released in three editions: a regular edition and two limited editions. The regular edition includes the two A-sides, two bonus tracks, and the karaoke version of all the songs. Limited edition A includes a bonus DVD with the music video for "Calling" while limited edition B includes a bonus DVD with the music video for "Breathless". Both limited editions also include a 12-page lyrics booklet.

== Composition ==
The music for "Calling" was written by Andreas Johansson and Youwhich. The lyrics were written by s-Tnk and Eltvo. A writer from CDJournal described "Calling" as a "rocking number". The song features edgy synths that accent a heavy band sound. "Breathless" was composed by Takuya Harada, Christofer Erixon, and Joakim Björnberg, with lyrics by Hydrant. CDJournal described it as a cool dance tune that also has hard elements.

== Track listing ==
Regular edition
No.	Title	Lyrics	Music	Arrangement	Length
1.	"Calling"	s-Tnk; Eltvo	Andreas Johansson; Youwhich	Tomoki Ishizuka	4:01
2.	"Breathless"	Hydrant	Takuya Harada; Christofer Erixon; Joakim Björnberg	Hirofumi Sasaki	4:59
3.	"Alright!!" (オーライ!!)	Soluna	Figge Boström	Trevor Ingram	3:43
4.	"Full of Love"	Shun; R.P.P	Dr. Hardcastle; Iggy Strange Dahl	Taku Yoshioka	3:51
5.	"Calling" (Instrumental)				4:01
6.	"Breathless" (Instrumental)				4:59
7.	"Alright!!" (Instrumental)				3:43
8.	"Full of Love" (Instrumental)				3:51
Total length:					33:08

Limited edition A
No.	Title	Lyrics	Music	Arrangement	Length
1.	"Calling"	s-Tnk; Eltvo	Johansson; Youwhich	Ishizuka	4:01
2.	"Breathless"	Hydrant	Harada; Erixon; Björnberg	Sasaki	4:57
Total length:					8:58

Limited edition A – DVD
No.	Title	Director	Length
1.	"Calling" (Music video)	Kensuke Kawamura

Limited edition B
No.	Title	Lyrics	Music	Arrangement	Length
1.	"Breathless"	Hydrant	Harada; Erixon; Björnberg	Sasaki	5:57
2.	"Calling"	s-Tnk; Eltvo	Johansson; Youwhich	Ishizuka	4:01
Total length:					8:58

Limited edition B – DVD
No.	Title	Director	Length
1.	"Breathless" (Music video)	Hideaki Sunaga

== See also ==
- List of Oricon number-one singles of 2013
