= Aozora no Shita, Kimi no Tonari =

- Regular edition cover

Single by Arashi

from the album Japonism
- Released: May 13, 2015
- Recorded: 2015
- Genre: Pop
- Label: J Storm
- Songwriter(s): Wonder Note; s-Tnk; Gigi; Metropolitan Digital Clique

Arashi singles chronology
"Sakura" (2015)	"Aozora no Shita, Kimi no Tonari" (2015)	"Ai o Sakebe" (2015)

"Aozora no Shita, Kimi no Tonari" (青空の下、キミのとなり) is the 46th single by Japanese boy band Arashi. It was released on May 13, 2015. The single was released in two editions: a first press/limited edition and a regular edition. The first press/limited edition contains the B-side "Dandelion" and the music video and making-of for "Aozora no Shita, Kimi no Tonari" while the regular edition contains two B-sides, the instrumental for "Aozora no Shita, Kimi no Tonari" and an original talk track. It reached number-one on the weekly Oricon Singles Chart, selling 501,010 copies. It also reached number-one on the Billboard Japan Hot 100.

== Single information ==
The first press/limited edition contains the B-side "Dandelion", the music video and making-of for "Aozora no Shita, Kimi no Tonari", and a 14-page photo lyrics booklet while the regular edition contains the B-sides "Kono Te no Hira ni" and "Nando datte", the instrumental for "Aozora no Shita, Kimi no Tonari" and an original talk track "Ura Ara Talk 2015". The album jacket covers for both versions are different.

"Aozora no Shita, Kimi no Tonari" was used as the theme song for the drama Yōkoso, Wagaya e starring Arashi member Aiba Masaki.

== Track listing ==
Regular edition
No.	Title	Lyrics	Music	Arrangement	Length
1.	"Aozora no Shita, Kimi no Tonari" (青空の下、キミのとなり)	Wonder Note; s-Tnk	Gigi; Wonder Note	Metropolitan Digital Clique	4:04
2.	"Kono Te no Hira ni" (この手のひらに)	Saeki YouthK; Squaref; John World	Supercharge; Saeki YouthK	Taku Yoshioka	3:50
3.	"Nando datte" (何度だって)	Youth Case	Youth Case	Youth Case	4:25
4.	"Aozora no Shita, Kimi no Tonari" (instrumental)				4:06
5.	"Ura Ara Talk 2015" (Original Talk Track)				39:07
Total length:					55:34

Limited edition
No.	Title	Lyrics	Music	Arrangement	Length
1.	"Aozora no Shita, Kimi no Tonari"	Wonder Note; s-Tnk	Gigi; Wonder Note	Metropolitan Digital Clique	4:04
2.	"Dandelion"	ASIL; Macoto56	AKJ; ASIL	A.K.Janeway	3:30
3.	"Aozora no Shita, Kimi no Tonari (video clip + making-of)" (DVD)
Total length:					7:34

== Charts and certifications ==
=== Charts ===
Chart (2015)	Peak position
Japan Oricon single Daily Chart	1
Japan Oricon single Weekly Chart	1
Japan Oricon single Yearly Chart	9
Billboard Japan Hot 100	1
Billboard Japan Top Single Sales Year End	1

=== Sales and certifications ===
Country	Provider	Sales	Certification
Japan	RIAJ	571,597	Double Platinum

== Release history ==
Country	Release date	Label	Format	Catalog
Japan	May 13, 2015	J Storm	CD+DVD	JACA-5464-5465
Japan	May 13, 2015	J Storm	CD	JACA-5466
Taiwan	May 29, 2015	Avex Asia	CD+DVD	JAJSG27067/A
Taiwan	May 29, 2015	Avex Asia	CD	JAJSG27067
South Korea	June 3, 2015	S.M. Entertainment	CD	SMKJT0532
