= Mujin Eki =

Single by Misaki Iwasa
- A-side: "Mujin Eki"
- Released: February 1, 2012
- Genre: Enka
- Label: Tokuma Japan
- Songwriter(s): Yasushi Akimoto (lyrics)
- Producer(s): Yasushi Akimoto

Misaki Iwasa singles chronology
"Mujin Eki" (2012)	"Moshimo Watashi ga Sora ni Sundeitara" (2013)

"Mujin Eki" (むじんえき, "Ghost Station") is Misaki Iwasa's first solo single. Iwasa is the first member from AKB48 to debut as an enka singer. The CD was released as a regular and limited edition, with the former containing a DVD.

== Track listing ==
=== Regular Edition ===
CD
No.	Title	Length
1.	"Mujin Eki" (無人駅)
2.	"Kikyou (AKB48 cover)"
3.	"Seto no Hanayome (Rumiko Koyanagi cover)" (瀬戸の花嫁)
4.	"Mujin Eki (off vocal)"
5.	"Kikyou (off vocal)"
6.	"Seto no Hanayome (off vocal)"

=== Limited Edition ===
CD
No.	Title	Length
1.	"Mujin Eki" (無人駅)
2.	"Heavy Rotation (enka ver.)"
3.	"Tsubasa wo Kudasai (Tori Akai cover)" (翼をください;)
4.	"Seto no Hanayome (Rumiko Koyanagi cover)"
5.	"Mujin Eki (off vocal)"
6.	"Heavy Rotation (enka ver.) (off vocal)"
7.	"Tsubasa wo Kudasai (off vocal)" (いつでも そばにいてあげる（Instrumental）)
8.	"Seto no Hanayome (off vocal)"
