= Ittajanaika/CloveR =

Single by Kanjani Eight
- Released: October 15, 2014 (Japan)

Kanjani Eight singles chronology
"ER2" (2014)	"Ittajanaika/CloveR" (2014)	"Gamushara Kōshinkyoku" (2014)

"Ittajanaika/CloveR" (言ったじゃないか/CloveR) is a single by Japanese boy band Kanjani Eight. It was released on October 15, 2014. It debuted in number one on the weekly Oricon Singles Chart and reached number one on the Billboard Japan Hot 100. It was the 20th best-selling single of the year in Japan, with 308,369 copies.
