= Natsu no Free & Easy =

2014 single by Nogizaka46

- Regular edition cover

Single by Nogizaka46

from the album Tōmei na Iro
- B-side: "Nani mo Dekizu ni Soba ni Iru"; "Sono Saki no Deguchi" (Type-A); "Mukuchi na Lion" (Type-B); "Koko ni Iru Riyū" (Type-C); "Boku ga Ikanakya Dare ga Ikunda?" (Regular)
- Released: July 9, 2014 (Japan)
- Genre: J-pop
- Length: 5:02
- Label: N46Div.
- Songwriters: Yasushi Akimoto; Tomonori Inoue; Kadono Toshikazu; Tomohiro Nakatsuchi
- Producer: Yasushi Akimoto

Nogizaka46 singles chronology
"Kizuitara Kataomoi" (2014)	"Natsu no Free & Easy" (2014)	"Nandome no Aozora ka?" (2014)

"Natsu no Free & Easy" (Japanese: 夏のFree&Easy; "Summer Free and Easy")) is the 9th single by Nogizaka46. It was released on July 9, 2014. It debuted in number one on the weekly Oricon Singles Chart. It was the best-selling single in July. It has sold a total of 481,533 copies, as of August 25 (chart date). It reached number one on the Billboard Japan Hot 100. It was the 11th best-selling single of the year in Japan, with 526,564 copies.

== Release ==
This single was released in 4 versions. Type-A, Type-B, Type-C and a regular edition. Type-C includes the undergroup member's song. Rena Matsui who is an exchange member from SKE48 joined this single. The center position in the choreography for the title song is held by Nanase Nishino.

== Track listing ==
=== Type-A ===
CD
No.	Title	Length
1.	"Natsu no Free & Easy" (夏のFree&Easy)	5:02
2.	"Nani mo Dekizu ni Soba ni Iru" (何もできずにそばにいる)	4:16
3.	"Sono Saki no Deguchi" (その先の出口)	4:04
4.	"Natsu no Free & Easy (off vocal ver.)" (夏のFree&Easy off vocal ver.)	5:02
5.	"Nani mo Dekizu ni Soba ni Iru (off vocal ver.)" (何もできずにそばにいる off vocal ver.)	4:16
6.	"Sono Saki no Deguchi (off vocal ver.)" (その先の出口 off vocal ver.)	4:03

DVD
No.	Title	Length
1.	"Natsu no Free & Easy Music Video"
2.	"Sono Saki no Deguchi Music Video"
3.	"Rina Ikoma × Sōhei Okano・Yuriko Taki"
4.	"Misa Etō × Wataru Yamamoto"
5.	"Kazumi Takayama × Renki Yamasaki"
6.	"Kana Nakada × Jun Nakabayashi"
7.	"Seira Nagashima × Nozomu Nakajima"
8.	"Nanase Nishino × Tarō Okagawa"
9.	"Hina Higuchi × Hideya Saishu・Teru Tsujinaka"
10.	"Mai Fukagawa × Atsuhiro Yamada"
11.	"Minami Hoshino × Keidai Miyagawa"
12.	"Rina Yamato × Junichi Harima"
13.	"Maaya Wada × Isao Taniguchi・Daisuke Wada"
14.	"Kenkyūsei × Atsuhiro Yamada Part 1"

=== Type-B ===
CD
No.	Title	Length
1.	"Natsu no Free & Easy" (夏のFree&Easy)	5:02
2.	"Nani mo Dekizu ni Soba ni Iru" (何もできずにそばにいる)	4:16
3.	"Mukuchi na Lion" (無口なライオン)	4:24
4.	"Natsu no Free & Easy (off vocal ver.)" (夏のFree&Easy off vocal ver.)	5:02
5.	"Nani mo Dekizu ni Soba ni Iru (off vocal ver.)" (何もできずにそばにいる off vocal ver.)	4:16
6.	"Mukuchi na Lion (off vocal ver.)" (無口なライオン off vocal ver.)	4:22

DVD
No.	Title	Length
1.	"Natsu no Free & Easy Music Video"
2.	"Mukuchi na Lion Music Video"
3.	"Nene Itō × tangent"
4.	"Marika Itō × Kazuaki Seki"
5.	"Hina Kawago × Yukio-Bu"
6.	"Asuka Saitō × Yūki Aoyama"
7.	"Chiharu Saitō × Den Taguchi"
8.	"Yūri Saitō × Santa Yamagishi"
9.	"Reika Sakurai × Satoshi Miki"
10.	"Mai Shiraishi × Takeshi Maruyama"
11.	"Nanami Hashimoto × Izuru Kumasaka"
12.	"Seira Hatanaka × Kentarō Shima・Satomi Takeda"
13.	"Miona Hori × Yōji Akiba"
14.	"Kenkyūsei × Atsuhiro Yamada Part 2"

=== Type-C ===
CD
No.	Title	Length
1.	"Natsu no Free & Easy" (夏のFree&Easy)	5:02
2.	"Nani mo Dekizu ni Soba ni Iru" (何もできずにそばにいる)	4:16
3.	"Koko ni Iru Riyū" (ここにいる理由)	3:55
4.	"Natsu no Free & Easy (off vocal ver.)" (夏のFree&Easy off vocal ver.)	5:02
5.	"Nani mo Dekizu ni Soba ni Iru (off vocal ver.)" (何もできずにそばにいる off vocal ver.)	4:16
6.	"Koko ni Iru Riyū (off vocal ver.)" (ここにいる理由 off vocal ver.)	3:54

DVD
No.	Title	Length
1.	"Natsu no Free & Easy Music Video"
2.	"Koko ni Iru Riyū Music Video"
3.	"Manatsu Akimoto × Nao Hirano・Naomi Izumida"
4.	"Sayuri Inoue × Yūsuke Koroyasu"
5.	"Mahiro Kawamura × Takehiro Ōishi"
6.	"Hinako Kitano × Tomohiro Kojō・Masayuki Ueda"
7.	"Mai Shinuchi × Makoto Sasagawa"
8.	"Himeka Nakamoto × Shigeru Tsukita・Atsuhiko Yamamoto・Mai Shibatani"
9.	"Ami Nōjō × Jun Okabe"
10.	"Rena Matsui × Mitsuaki Takemae"
11.	"Sayuri Matsumura × Tooru Yoshida"
12.	"Yumi Wakatsuki × Taikou Nakamura"
13.	"Kenkyūsei × Atsuhiro Yamada Part 2"

=== Regular Edition ===
CD
No.	Title	Lyrics	Music	Artist(s)	Length
1.	"Natsu no Free & Easy" (夏のFree&Easy)	Yasushi Akimoto	Tomonori Inoue	Nanase Nishino, et cetera	5:02
2.	"Nani mo Dekizu ni Soba ni Iru" (何もできずにそばにいる)	Yasushi Akimoto	Kadono Toshikazu	Nanase Nishino, et cetera	4:16
3.	"Boku ga Ikanakya Dare ga Ikunda?" (Boku ga Ikanakya Dare ga Ikunda? (僕が行かなきゃ誰が行くんだ?; If I do not go, who will?))	Yasushi Akimoto	Tomohiro Nakatsuchi		4:22
4.	"Natsu no Free & Easy (off vocal ver.)" (夏のFree&Easy off vocal ver.)		Tomonori Inoue		5:02
5.	"Nani mo Dekizu ni Soba ni Iru (off vocal ver.)" (何もできずにそばにいる off vocal ver.)		Kadono Toshikazu		4:16
6.	"Boku ga Ikanakya Dare ga Ikunda? (off vocal ver.)" (僕が行かなきゃ誰が行くんだ? off vocal ver.)		Tomohiro Nakatsuchi		4:21

== Participating members ==
Centre: Nanase Nishino

3rd Row: Misa Eto, Sayuri Inoue, Yūri Saitō, Minami Hoshino, Rina Yamato, Miona Hori, Kazumi Takayama

2nd Row: Yumi Wakatsuki, Manatsu Akimoto, Reika Sakurai, Mai Fukagawa, Rina Ikoma

1st Row: Rena Matsui, Mai Shiraishi, Nanase Nishino (centre), Nanami Hashimoto, Sayuri Matsumura

== Chart and certifications ==
=== Weekly charts ===
Chart (2014)	Peak position
Japan (Oricon Weekly Singles Chart)	1
Japan (Billboard Japan Hot 100)	1
Korea (GAON)	62
Korea Overseas (GAON)	14

=== Year-end charts ===
Chart (2014)	Peak position
Japan (Oricon Yearly Singles Chart)	11

=== Certifications ===
Region	Certification	Certified units/sales
Japan (RIAJ)	2× Platinum	500,000^{^}
^{^} Shipments figures based on certification alone.
