= Love (Arashi album) =

- Regular edition cover

Studio album by Arashi
- Released: October 23, 2013
- Studios: Victor Studio, Japan; Bunkamura Studio, Japan
- Genres: Pop, R&B
- Languages: Japanese, English
- Label: J Storm

Arashi chronology
Popcorn (2012)	Love (2013)	The Digitalian (2014)

Singles from Love
- 1. "Calling/Breathless" Released: March 18, 2013; 2. "Endless Game" Released: May 29, 2013

Love (stylized as LOVE) is the twelfth studio album of the Japanese boy band Arashi. The album was released on October 23, 2013, under their record label J Storm in two editions: a limited edition and a regular edition. The regular edition comes with a 32-page photo lyrics booklet, while the limited edition comes with a 60-page photo lyrics booklet and a bonus DVD with a music video for "P・A・R・A・D・O・X". The album sold over 670,000 copies in its first week and became the best-selling album of 2013 in Japan. It was released digitally on February 7, 2020.

== Album information ==
Both the regular edition and the limited edition contain 16 songs. The regular edition comes with a 32-page photo lyrics booklet, while the limited edition comes with a 60-page photo lyrics booklet and a bonus DVD with a music video for "P・A・R・A・D・O・X". The album jacket cover for both versions are different.

=== Songs ===
"Love" includes two of the group's previously released singles: "Calling/Breathless" and "Endless Game". This album also includes eight new songs plus five of each member's solo songs.

The limited edition comes with a bonus music video for one of the new songs on the album, "P・A・R・A・D・O・X". The members of Arashi travelled to New York City to learn the choreography for this song, which was choreographed by JaQuel Knight. Arashi has not released a music video for an album song since 2011, when they released a video for "Mada Minu Sekai e" from the album Beautiful World.

== Promotion ==
To support their new album, Arashi performed a live tour "Arashi LIVE TOUR Love" hitting all the major dome stadiums in Japan. They had 16 performances beginning on Nagoya Dome on November 8, followed by Sapporo Dome on November 15, Osaka Dome on November 22, Tokyo Dome on December 12, and Fukuoka Dome on December 20, 2013.

A video explaining the steps for the dance to their new song, "FUNKY", was uploaded onto their agency's official website. Arashi encouraged fans to learn the steps so that they could all dance together during the concert.

== Track listing ==
CD
No.	Title	Lyrics	Music	Arrangement	Length
1.	"Ai o Utaō"	Squaref; MfmsiQ; John World; Sho Sakurai	Benny Jansson	Hirofumi Sasaki	4:07
2.	"Sayonara no Ato de"	R.P.P.	MiNE; Atsushi Shimada; Fredrik Samsson	Taku Yoshioka	4:03
3.	"Confusion"	Shigeo; Macoto56	Joe Killington; Katerina Bramley; Tim Worthington; Michael Conn	Tomoki Ishizuka	3:20
4.	"Hit the Floor" (Satoshi Ohno solo)	Alleztune	Susumu Kawaguchi; Bert; Rolf	Ishizuka	4:54
5.	"P･A･R･A･D･O･X"	Akira; H&Co.; Squaref; S-Tnk; Sakurai	James Bird; Olly Goodman; Michael Duke; Emma Rohan	A.K.Janeway; Yoshioka; Bird; Goodman; Duke; Rohan	3:20
6.	"Sugar and Salt" (Sho Sakurai solo)	100+; Sakurai	Insist	Insist	4:31
7.	"Breathless"	Hydrant	Takuya Harada; Christofer Erixon; Joakim Björnberg	Sasaki	4:59
8.	"20825-Nichi-me no Kyoku" (Kazunari Ninomiya solo)	Kazunari Ninomiya	Ninomiya	Ha-j; Ninomiya	4:19
9.	"Rock Tonight"	100+	100+	BJ Khan
10.	"Endless Game"	100+	Chris Janey; Dyce Taylor	2H; Janey	3:58
11.	"Calling"	S-Tnk; Eltvo	Andreas Johansson; Youwhich	Ishizuka	4:01
12.	"Yozora e no Tegami" (Masaki Aiba solo)	Yuya Abe	Nihonjin	Bigshooter Boys	4:48
13.	"Dance in the Dark" (Jun Matsumoto solo)	Hydrant	Harada; SkyLine; Erixon	Pieni Tonttu	3:49
14.	"Starlight Kiss"	Akira; S-Tnk; Sakurai	Figge Boström; Kawaguchi	Kawaguchi	3:59
15.	"Funky"	MfmsiQ; S-Tnk	BJ Khan; Björnberg; Erixon	BJ Khan	4:02
16.	"Tears"	Takashi Ogawa; Squaref	Yūsuke Katō	BJ Khan	4:34
Total length:					67:01

DVD
No.	Title	Director	Length
1.	"P･A･R･A･D･O･X" (Music video)	Shūichi Banba

== Personnel ==
Credits adapted from liner notes.

=== Musicians ===
- Arashi
  - Aiba Masaki – lead vocals
  - Jun Matsumoto – lead vocals
  - Kazunari Ninomiya – lead vocals
  - Satoshi Ohno – lead vocals
  - Sho Sakurai – lead vocals
- Kumi Sasaki – chorus arrangement (tracks 1, 6), chorus (track 1)
- ko-saku – chorus arrangement (tracks 2, 3, 7, 8, 9, 10, 11, 12, 13, 14, 15, 16)
- Shotaro – chorus arrangement (tracks 4, 11)
- Akira – chorus arrangement (track 5)
- ha-j – chorus arrangement (track 8)
- Taeko Saito – chorus (track 1)
- Saeko Suzuki – chorus (track 1)
- Naoki Takao – chorus (track 1)
- Yoshito Fuchigami – chorus (track 1)
- Yutaka Odawara – drums (track 3)
- TARROW-ONE – drums (track 6)
- Toru Kawamura – drums (track 8)
- Chiharu Mikuzuki – bass guitar (track 3)
- SHIYOU a.k.a. Pit Bulldog – bass guitar (track 6)
- Takeshi Taneda – bass guitar (tracks 8, 9, 15, 16)
- Yuzo Shibata – bass guitar (track 11)
- Hiroomi Shitara – electric guitar (tracks 1, 7, 8), acoustic guitar (track 8), electric mandolin (track 8), mandolin (track 8)
- Sho Horisaki – electric guitar (track 3)
- TAKU a.k.a. K-CITY PRINCE – electric guitar (track 6), programming (track 6)
- Horikazu Ogura – electric guitar (track 10), acoustic guitar (track 10)
- Genta Fukue – electric guitar (track 11)
- Akitoshi Kuroda – electric guitar (track 13), acoustic guitar (track 13), mandolin (track 13), ukulele (track 13)
- Gen ittetsu Strings – strings (tracks 1, 7, 10, 11, 15, 16)
- the Gaya-xy – gaya (tracks 5, 9)
- MITCH – trumpet (track 6)
- KenT – tenor saxophone (track 6)
- DJ O.H.B.A – turntable (track 6)

=== Production ===
- Johnny H. Kitagawa – executive producer
- Julie K. – producer
- Jin Kano – musician co-ordinator
- Shigeru Tanida – recording, mixing
- Mikiro Yamda – recording
- Akitomu Takakuwa – recording
- Yohei Takita – recording
- Hideyuki Matsuhashi – recording
- Masahito Komori – recording
- Shohei Kojima – 2nd engineer
- Hiroaki Notoya – 2nd engineer
- Masayuki Tsuruta – 2nd engineer
- Ryota Hattanda – 2nd engineer
- Hiroshi Kawasaki – mastering
- Takayuki Nakazawa – art direction & design
- Hiroshi Manaka – photography
- Takafumi Kawasaki – wardrobe stylist
- MAKE-UP ROOM – hair & make-up
- Masato Kawai – props
- JaQuel Knight – choreographer (DVD)

== Release history ==
Country	Release date	Label	Format	Catalog
Japan	October 21, 2013	J Storm	CD+DVD	JACA-5373-5374
Japan	October 21, 2013	J Storm	CD	JACA-5482-5483
Taiwan	November 8, 2013	Avex Asia	CD+DVD	JAJCD26018/A
Taiwan	November 8, 2013	Avex Asia	CD	JAJCD26018
South Korea	November 11, 2013	S.M. Entertainment	CD+DVD	SMKJT0302/B
South Korea	November 11, 2013	S.M. Entertainment	CD	SMKJT0303
