= Nandome no Aozora ka? =

2014 single by Nogizaka46

- Regular edition cover

Single by Nogizaka46

from the album Tōmei na Iro
- B-side: "Tōmawari no Aijō"; "Korogatta Kane o Narase!" (Type-A); "Watashi, Okiru." (Type-B); "Ano Hi Boku wa Tossa ni Uso o Tsuita" (Type-C); "Tender days" (Regular)
- Released: October 8, 2014 (Japan)
- Genre: J-pop
- Length: 4:49
- Label: N46Div.
- Songwriters: Yasushi Akimoto, Masahiro Kawaura
- Producer: Yasushi Akimoto

Nogizaka46 singles chronology
| "Natsu no Free & Easy" (2014) | "Nandome no Aozora ka?" (2014) | "Inochi wa Utsukushii" (2015) |

"Nandome no Aozora ka?" (Japanese: 何度目の青空か?; "How many blue skies have there been?") is the 10th single by Japanese idol girl group Nogizaka46. It was released on October 8, 2014. It debuted in number one on the weekly Oricon Singles Chart and, as of October 20, 2014 (issue date), has sold 478,888 copies. It also reached number one on the Billboard Japan Hot 100. It was the 8th best-selling single of the year in Japan, with 578,174 copies.

== Release ==
This single was released in 4 versions. Type-A, Type-B, Type-C, and a regular edition. The center position in the choreography for the title song is held by Erika Ikuta. She temporally suspended her activities to prepare for college and resumed from this single.

== Track listing ==
=== Type-A ===
CD
| No. | Title | Length |
|---|---|---|
| 1. | "Nandome no Aozora ka?" (何度目の青空か?) | 4:49 |
| 2. | "Tōmawari no Aijō" (遠回りの愛情) | 4:16 |
| 3. | "Korogatta Kane o Narase!" (転がった鐘を鳴らせ!) | 4:15 |
| 4. | "Nandome no Aozora ka? -off vocal ver.-" (何度目の青空か? -off vocal ver.-) | 4:49 |
| 5. | "Tōmawari no Aijō -off vocal ver.-" (遠回りの愛情 -off vocal ver.-) | 4:16 |
| 6. | "Korogatta Kane o Narase! -off vocal ver.-" (転がった鐘を鳴らせ! -off vocal ver.-) | 4:14 |

DVD
| No. | Title | Length |
|---|---|---|
| 1. | "Nandome no Aozora ka? Music Video" |
| 2. | "Korogatta Kane o Narase! Music Video" |
| 3. | "Manatsu Akimoto" |
| 4. | "Erika Ikuta" |
| 5. | "Chiharu Saitō" |
| 6. | "Mai Shinuchi" |
| 7. | "Himeka Nakamoto" |
| 8. | "Seira Nagashima" |
| 9. | "Ami Nōjō" |
| 10. | "Nanami Hashimoto" |
| 11. | "Hina Higuchi" |
| 12. | "Minami Hoshino" |
| 13. | "Rena Matsui" |
| 14. | "Kenkyūsei Part 1" |

=== Type-B ===
CD
| No. | Title | Length |
|---|---|---|
| 1. | "Nandome no Aozora ka?" (何度目の青空か?) | 4:49 |
| 2. | "Tōmawari no Aijō" (遠回りの愛情) | 4:16 |
| 3. | "Watashi, Okiru." (私、起きる。) | 3:52 |
| 4. | "Nandome no Aozora ka? -off vocal ver.-" (何度目の青空か? -off vocal ver.-) | 4:49 |
| 5. | "Tōmawari no Aijō -off vocal ver.-" (遠回りの愛情 -off vocal ver.-) | 4:16 |
| 6. | "Watashi, Okiru. -off vocal ver.-" (私、起きる。 -off vocal ver.-) | 3:51 |

DVD
| No. | Title | Length |
|---|---|---|
| 1. | "Nandome no Aozora ka? Music Video" |
| 2. | "Watashi, Okiru. Music Video" |
| 3. | "Karin Itō" |
| 4. | "Marika Itō" |
| 5. | "Hina Kawago" |
| 6. | "Mahiro Kawamura" |
| 7. | "Hinako Kitano" |
| 8. | "Asuka Saitō" |
| 9. | "Reika Sakurai" |
| 10. | "Mai Shiraishi" |
| 11. | "Sayuri Matsumura" |
| 12. | "Yumi Wakatsuki" |
| 13. | "Maaya Wada" |
| 14. | "Kenkyūsei Part 2" |

=== Type-C ===
CD
| No. | Title | Length |
|---|---|---|
| 1. | "Nandome no Aozora ka?" (何度目の青空か?) | 4:49 |
| 2. | "Tōmawari no Aijō" (遠回りの愛情) | 4:16 |
| 3. | "Ano Hi Boku wa Tossa ni Uso o Tsuita" (あの日 僕は咄嗟に嘘をついた) | 4:13 |
| 4. | "Nandome no Aozora ka? -off vocal ver.-" (何度目の青空か? -off vocal ver.-) | 4:49 |
| 5. | "Tōmawari no Aijō -off vocal ver.-" (遠回りの愛情 -off vocal ver.-) | 4:16 |
| 6. | "Ano Hi Boku wa Tossa ni Uso o Tsuita -off vocal ver.-" (あの日 僕は咄嗟に嘘をついた -off vocal ver.-) | 4:12 |

DVD
| No. | Title | Length |
|---|---|---|
| 1. | "Nandome no Aozora ka? Music Video" |
| 2. | "Ano Hi Boku wa Tossa ni Uso o Tsuita Music Video" |
| 3. | "Rina Ikoma" |
| 4. | "Sayuri Inoue" |
| 5. | "Misa Etō" |
| 6. | "Yūri Saitō" |
| 7. | "Kazumi Takayama" |
| 8. | "Kana Nakada" |
| 9. | "Nanase Nishino" |
| 10. | "Seira Hatanaka" |
| 11. | "Mai Fukagawa" |
| 12. | "Miona Hori" |
| 13. | "Rina Yamato" |
| 14. | "Kenkyūsei Part 3" |

=== Regular Edition ===
CD
| No. | Title | Lyrics | Music | Artist(s) | Length |
|---|---|---|---|---|---|
| 1. | "Nandome no Aozora ka?" (何度目の青空か?) | Yasushi Akimoto | Masahiro Kawaura | Erika Ikuta, et cetera | 4:49 |
| 2. | "Tōmawari no Aijō" (遠回りの愛情) | Yasushi Akimoto | Noda Akiko | Reika Sakurai, Seira Nagashima, et cetera | 4:16 |
| 3. | "Tender days" | Yasushi Akimoto | SoichiroK, Nozomu.S | Nanami Hashimoto, et cetera | 4:42 |
| 4. | "Nandome no Aozora ka? -off vocal ver.-" (何度目の青空か? -off vocal ver.-) | | Tomonori Inoue | | 4:49 |
| 5. | "Tōmawari no Aijō -off vocal ver.-" (遠回りの愛情 -off vocal ver.-) | | Kadono Toshikazu | | 4:16 |
| 6. | "Tender days -off vocal ver.-" | | Tomohiro Nakatsuchi | | 4:41 |

== Participating members ==
Centre: Erika Ikuta

3rd Row: Misa Etō, Yumi Wakatsuki, Miona Hori, Minami Hoshino, Kazumi Takayama, Chiharu Saitō

2nd Row: Sayuri Matsumura, Manatsu Akimoto, Rina Ikoma, Reika Sakurai, Mai Fukagawa

1st Row: Rena Matsui, Mai Shiraishi, Erika Ikuta (centre), Nanase Nishino, Nanami Hashimoto

== Chart and certifications ==
=== Weekly charts ===
| Chart (2014) | Peak position |
|---|---|
| Japan (Oricon Weekly Singles Chart) | 1 |
| Japan (Billboard Japan Hot 100) | 1 |

=== Year-end charts ===
| Chart (2014) | Peak position |
|---|---|
| Japan (Oricon Yearly Singles Chart) | 8 |

=== Certifications ===
| Region | Certification | Certified units/sales |
|---|---|---|
| Japan (RIAJ) | 3× Platinum | 750,000^{^} |
^{^} Shipments figures based on certification alone.
