= ER2 =

ER2, ER-2, ER II etc. may refer to:

- Elizabeth II's royal cypher E II R (sometimes written as ER II) for Elizabeth II Regina (Elizabeth II, Queen)
- "ER2" (Kanjani Eight song), a single by Japanese boy band Kanjani Eight
- ER2 electric trainset, an electric passenger railcar built in Latvia and Russia from 1962 to 1984
- NASA ER-2, "Earth Resources 2", an American very high-altitude civilian atmospheric research fixed-wing aircraft based on the Lockheed U-2 reconnaissance aircraft in which only 2 were made.
