= Endless Game =

- Regular edition cover

Single by Arashi

from the album Love
- B-side: "Intergalactic"; "Monochrome"; "Magic Hour"
- Released: May 29, 2013
- Recorded: 2013
- Label: J Storm
- Songwriters: 100+; Chris Janey; Dyce Taylor

Arashi singles chronology
"Calling / Breathless" (2013)	"Endless Game" (2013)	"Bittersweet" (2014)

"Endless Game" is the 41st single released by Japanese boy band Arashi. "Endless Game" was used as the theme song for the drama Kazoku Game starring Arashi member Sho Sakurai. It reached number one on the Oricon Singles Chart and was the 10th best-selling single in Japan in 2013, with 557,217 copies.

== Single information ==
The single was released in two editions: a limited edition including a bonus DVD with a music video for "Endless Game", and a regular CD only edition including two bonus tracks and karaoke tracks for all the songs. The limited edition also contains a 16-page booklet.

== Chart performance ==
"Endless Game" debuted at the top of the Oricon Singles Chart with opening sales of 478,000 copies, becoming the group's 30th consecutive number-one single in Japan. It was certified Double Platinum by the Recording Industry Association of Japan (RIAJ) for shipments of 500,000 units.

== Track listing ==
Regular edition
No.	Title	Lyrics	Music	Arrangement	Length
1.	"Endless Game"	100+	Chris Janey; Dyce Taylor	2H; Janey	3:58
2.	"Intergalactic"	Octobar	Stephan Elfgren; Eltvo	Elfgren	4:52
3.	"Monochrome" (モノクロ)	Tomokazu Miura	GK	GK; Hirofumi Sasaki	4:18
4.	"Endless Game" (instrumental)				3:58
5.	"Intergalactic" (instrumental)				4:52
6.	"Monochrome" (instrumental)				4:14
Total length:					26:14

Limited edition
No.	Title	Lyrics	Music	Arrangement	Length
1.	"Endless Game"	100+	Janey; Taylor	2H; Janey	3:58
2.	"Magic Hour"	S-Tnk	HJ & Co.; Ryumei Odagi	Taku Yoshioka	4:04
3.	"Magic Hour" (instrumental)				4:04
Total length:					12:06

Limited edition – DVD
No.	Title	Length
1.	"Endless Game" (Music video)

== See also ==
- List of Oricon number-one singles of 2013
