= Daremo Shiranai =

"Daremo Shiranai (誰も知らない)"
- Regular edition cover

Single by Arashi

from the album The Digitalian
- B-side: "Okaeri (おかえり)"; "Keep on Tryin'"; "Miracle Summer (ミラクル・サマー)"
- Released: May 28, 2014
- Recorded: 2014
- Genre: Pop
- Label: J Storm
- Songwriter(s): mfmsiQ, SQUAREF, John World, 作田雅弥 TAKUYA HARADA, Joakim Bjornberg, Christofer Erixon, BJ khan

Arashi singles chronology
"Guts!" (2014)	"Daremo Shiranai (誰も知らない)" (2014)	"Sakura" (2015)

"Daremo Shiranai" (誰も知らない, "Nobody Knows") is a Japanese-language song and the 44th single released by Japanese boy band Arashi. "Daremo Shiranai" was used as the theme song for the drama Shinigami-kun starring Arashi member Satoshi Ohno. It reached number one on the Oricon Singles Chart and was the 12th best-selling single of the year in Japan, with 525,055 copies sold.

== Single information ==
The single was released in two editions: a limited edition including a bonus track and a bonus DVD with a music video for "Daremo Shiranai", and a regular CD only edition including two bonus tracks and karaoke tracks for all the songs. The limited edition also contains a 16-page booklet.

== Track listing ==
Regular edition
No.	Title	Lyrics	Music	Arrangement	Length
1.	"Daremo Shiranai" (誰も知らない)	mfmsiQ; Squaref; John World; Sakuta Masaya	Takuya Harada; Joakim Björnberg; Christofer Erixon; BJ Khan	Hirofumi Sasaki; BJ Khan	4:04
2.	"Keep on Tryin'"	GK; Tom	GK; Tom	GK	4:21
3.	"Miracle Summer" (ミラクル・サマー)	Macoto56	Erixon; Björnberg; Susumu Kawaguchi	Metropolitan Digital Clique	4:23
4.	"Daremo Shiranai" (instrumental)				4:04
5.	"Keep on Tryin'" (instrumental)				4:21
6.	"Miracle Summer" (instrumental)				4:19
Total length:					25:34

Limited edition
No.	Title	Lyrics	Music	Arrangement	Length
1.	"Daremo Shiranai" (誰も知らない)	mfmsiQ; Squaref; World; Masaya	Harada; Björnberg; Erixon; BJ Khan	Sasaki; BJ Khan	4:04
2.	"Okaeri" (おかえり)	Katsuhiko Sugiyama	Sugiyama	Tomoki Ishizuka	4:46
3.	"Okaeri" (instrumental)				4:42
Total length:					13:33

Limited edition DVD
No.	Title	Length
1.	"Daremo Shiranai" (Music video)

== See also ==
- List of Oricon number-one singles of 2014
