= Sakura (Arashi song) =

- Regular edition cover

Single by Arashi
- B-side: "Rise and Shine"; "Onaji Sora no Shita de"; "More and More"
- Released: February 25, 2015
- Recorded: 2015
- Genre: Pop; rock
- Label: J Storm
- Songwriter: eltvo

Arashi singles chronology
"Daremo Shiranai" (2014)	"Sakura" (2015)	"Aozora no Shita, Kimi no Tonari" (2015)

"Sakura" is the 45th single by Japanese boy band Arashi. It was released on February 25, 2015 under their record label J Storm. "Sakura" was used as the theme song for the television drama Ouroborous, starring actors Toma Ikuta and Shun Oguri. The single was released in two editions: a first press/limited edition and a regular edition. The first press/limited edition contains the B-side "Rise and Shine" and the music video and making-of for "Sakura" while the regular edition contains two B-sides. The single sold 465,381 copies in its first week and topped the weekly Oricon Singles Chart. With over 520,000 copies sold, the single was certified Double Platinum by the Recording Industry Association of Japan (RIAJ). The single placed 11th on Oricon's 2015 yearly singles ranking.

== Single information ==
The first press/limited edition contains the music video and making-of for "Sakura", the B-side "Rise and Shine" and its instrumental, and a 16-page lyrics booklet while the regular edition contains the B-sides "Onaji Sora no Shita de" and "more and more", and the instrumentals for all three tracks. The album jacket covers for both versions are different.

"Sakura" was used as the theme song for the television drama Ouroborous, starring actors Toma Ikuta and Shun Oguri. This marks the first time Arashi has provided a theme song for a drama that did not star one of its members.

== Track listing ==
Regular edition
No.	Title	Lyrics	Music	Arrangement	Length
1.	"Sakura"	eltvo	eltvo	Hirofumi Sasaki	4:40
2.	"Onaji Sora no Shita de" (同じ空の下で)	Trevor Ingram	Ingram	Ingram	4:35
3.	"more and more"	HYDRANT	Daniel Sherman; Katerina Bramley; Robert Hanna	Taku Yoshioka	4:03
4.	"Sakura (instrumental)"				4:40
5.	"Onaji Sora no Shita de" (instrumental)				4:35
6.	"More and More" (instrumental)				3:59
Total length:					26:35

Limited edition CD
No.	Title	Lyrics	Music	Arrangement	Length
1.	"Sakura"	eltvo	eltvo	Sasaki	4:39
2.	"Rise and Shine"	100+; mfmsiQ; John World	Erik Lidbom; youwhich	Tomoki Ishizuka	4:33
3.	"Rise and Shine" (instrumental)				4:29
Total length:					13:42

Limited edition DVD
No.	Title	Length
1.	"Sakura (video clip + making-of)" (Sakura（ビデオ・クリップ＋メイキング）)

== Chart performance ==
The single debuted at number one on the Oricon daily singles chart selling 239,867 copies upon its release and selling 465,381 copies by the end of the week, topping the Oricon and Billboard Japan weekly singles charts. The single sold 30,490 copies in its second week and stayed in the top ten for three consecutive weeks. With 521,067 copies sold, the single placed 11th on Oricon's 2015 yearly singles ranking and third on Billboard Japan's top singles year-end list.

== Charts and certifications ==
=== Charts ===
Chart (2015)	Peak position
Japan Oricon single Daily Chart	1
Japan Oricon single Weekly Chart	1
Japan Oricon single Yearly Chart	11
Billboard Japan Hot 100	1
Billboard Japan Top Single Sales Year End	3

=== Sales and certifications ===
Country	Provider	Sales	Certification
Japan	RIAJ	521,067	Double Platinum

== Release history ==
Country	Release date	Label	Format	Catalog
Japan	February 25, 2015	J Storm	CD+DVD	JACA-5451-5452
Japan	February 25, 2015	J Storm	CD	JACA-5453
South Korea	March 18, 2015	S.M. Entertainment	CD	SMKJT0505
Taiwan	March 20, 2015	Avex Asia	CD+DVD	JAJSG27064/A
Taiwan	March 20, 2015	Avex Asia	CD	JAJSG27064
