= ER2 (Kanjani Eight song) =

"Omoidama"

Single by Kanjani Eight
- Released: August 6, 2014 (Japan)

Kanjani Eight singles chronology
"Omoidama" (2014)	"Omoidama" (2014)	"Ittajanaika/CloveR" (2014)

"ER2" is a single by Japanese boy band Kanjani Eight as Eight Ranger. It was released on August 6, 2014. It debuted in number one on the weekly Oricon Singles Chart and reached number one on the Billboard Japan Hot 100. It was the 27th best-selling single of 2014 in Japan, with 241,824 copies.
