= Hibiki (Kanjani Eight song) =

Single by Kanjani Eight
- Released: January 15, 2014 (Japan)

Kanjani Eight singles chronology
"Kokoro Sora Moyou" (2013)	"Hibiki" (2014)	"King of Otoko" (2014)

"Hibiki" (ひびき) is a single by Japanese boy band Kanjani Eight. It was released on January 15, 2014. It debuted in number one on the weekly Oricon Singles Chart and reached number one on the Billboard Japan Hot 100. It was the 24th best-selling single of the year in Japan, with 263,553 copies.
