= Gamushara Kōshinkyoku =

Single by Kanjani Eight
- Released: December 3, 2014 (Japan)

Kanjani Eight singles chronology
| "Ittajanaika/CloveR" (2014) | "Gamushara Kōshinkyoku" (2014) |

"Gamushara Kōshinkyoku" (がむしゃら行進曲) is a single by Japanese boy band Kanjani Eight. It was released on December 3, 2014. It debuted in number one on the weekly Oricon Singles Chart with 201,022 copies sold. It also reached number one on the Billboard Japan Hot 100.
