= Concrete & Grass =

The Concrete & Grass Music Festival (Chinese: 混凝草音乐节; pinyin: Hùn Níng Cǎo Yīnyuè Jié), commonly abbreviated to 'Concrete & Grass', is an outdoor music festival held in Shanghai, China. It showcases the independent music scene in China, and features a mix of international and regional bands. The festival was founded in 2015 by the promoter Split Works, and has featured artists like Gerard Way, RADWIMPS, A$AP Ferg, Carsick Cars, Stephen Malkmus, Princess Nokia, Thurston Moore,among others. The festival is spread over two days and is hosted by the Shanghai Rugby Football Club.
