= Moshimo Watashi ga Sora ni Sundeitara =

Single by Misaki Iwasa
- Released: January 9, 2013
- Genre: Enka
- Label: Tokuma Japan
- Songwriter: Akimoto, Yasushi
- Producer: Akimoto

Misaki Iwasa singles chronology
"Mujin Eki" (2012)	"Moshimo Watashi ga Sora ni Sundeitara" (2013)

"Moshimo Watashi ga Sora ni Sundeitara" (もしも私が空に住んでいたら) is the second solo single by Misaki Iwasa. It was released on January 9, 2013 and reached the fifth place on the Oricon weekly singles chart.
