= Another Future =

Single by Kis-My-Ft2

from the album Kis-My-World / Best of Kis-My-Ft2
- B-side: "Perfect World"; "Shine as you feel"
- Released: August 13, 2014 (Japan)
- Genre: J-pop
- Length: 3:56
- Label: Avex Trax

Kis-My-Ft2 singles chronology
"Hikari no Signal" (2014)	"Another Future" (2014)	"Thank you!" (2014)

Music video
- "Another Future" on YouTube "Perfect World" on YouTube

"Another Future" is the 11th single by Japanese boy band Kis-My-Ft2. It was the theme song of the second season of A Chef of Nobunaga starred Yuta Tamamori which was released on August 13, 2014.

The song "Perfect World" on the B-side is a commercial song for DHC Corporation "Medicated Acne Control Series" featuring Kis-My-Ft2.

Since this song is the theme song for jidaigeki drama A Chef of Nobunaga, the music video also has a Japanese modern theme, with Japanese umbrellas and Japanese lanterns. The music video for "Perfect World" was created with the theme of "a summer where the seven members live in a house together", features all the members in a brightly lit garden, splashing water on each other and having fun.

== Chart performance ==
It debuted in number one on the weekly Oricon Singles Chart and reached number one on the Billboard Japan Hot 100. It was the 3rd best-selling single in Japan in August 2014, with 250,473 copies. It was the 23rd best-selling single of the year in Japan, with 263,615 copies.

== Track listing ==
=== CD ===
1."Another Future" [3:56]

Theme song for television series of A Chef of Nobunaga starring Yuta Tamamori

2."Perfect World" [4:19]

DHC Corporation “Medicated Acne Control Series” Commercial song featuring Kis-My-Ft2

3."Shine as you feel" [4:46]

Included only on the 3rd Anniversary disc.

=== DVD ===
- First Edition A
1. "Another Future"（Music Video)
2. "Another Future"（Music Video Making Movie)
- First Edition B
1. "Perfect World"（Music Video)
2. "Perfect World"（Music Video Making Movie)
