= EIR =

EIR may refer to:

- Effective interest rate, a banking term
- Entrepreneur In Residence or Executive In Residence, a term in venture capital and business education
- Environmental Information Regulations 2004, a UK Statutory Instrument
- Equipment Identity Register, in a Network Switching Subsystem
- Extended information rate, burstable bandwidth in a Frame Relay network
- Establishment Inspection Report, the result of an investigation by the US FDA.
- Environmental Impact Report, see Environmental impact assessment
- Executive Intelligence Review, the flagship publication of the LaRouche movement
- Kodak Ektachrome Professional Infrared/EIR film, a type of Color Infrared film
- Ethniko Idryma Radiofonias, the National Radio Foundation of Greece
- East Indian Railway Company, introduced railways to eastern and northern India, later known as East Indian Railway (EIR)
- East Indian rosewood, one of the common names for Dalbergia latifolia and its hardwood

Eir may refer to

- Eir, a goddess in Norse mythology
- Eir (telecommunications), a major provider of telecommunications in Ireland
- Eir, a Spivak pronoun
- Eir, a character from the mobile video game Fire Emblem Heroes
- Eir Aoi, Japanese singer

== See also ==
- Eire
- EIRS
