= Omoidama =

Single by Kanjani Eight
- Released: July 2, 2014 (Japan)

Kanjani Eight singles chronology
"King of Otoko" (2014)	"Omoidama" (2014)	"ER2" (2014)

"Omoidama" (オモイダマ) is a single by Japanese boy band Kanjani Eight. It was released on July 2, 2014 as their 28th single. It debuted at number one on the weekly Oricon Singles Chart and reached number one on the Billboard Japan Hot 100.
