= Misaki Iwasa =

Japanese singer (born 1995)

- Also known as: Wasamin (わさみん)
- Born: January 30, 1995 (age 31); Chiba Prefecture, Japan
- Genres: Enka, Pop
- Occupation: Singer
- Years active: 2009–present
- Labels: Tokuma Japan; King Records; Pony Canyon
- Website: Official Site (in Japanese); Tokuma Japan Profile

Misaki Iwasa (岩佐 美咲, Iwasa Misaki; born January 30, 1995 in Chiba Prefecture) is a Japanese idol. She is a former member of the Japanese idol group AKB48 and enka singer. Her nickname is Wasamin. Her talent agency is Nagara Productions. She was also a member of the sub-unit Watarirouka Hashiritai 7.

== Career ==
2008

- December - Passed "AKB48's 4th Trainee Audition" and started her career as AKB48's 7th generation.

2009

- August 23 - During "Sokaku Matsuri" concert, it was announced that she was chosen to be a regular member. However, it took almost a year before the new teams started their theater shows, so she only officially became a member of Team A as of 27 July 2010. During the long wait, she was quite distressed about the situation and said, "I knew I had to do something, but I didn't know what to do."
- September 27 - Participated in AKB48's first oversea solo concert in New York. She was the only trainee alongside Sumire Sato.
- October 30 - Participated in AKB48's first musical troupe "∞・Infinity".

2010

- May 17 - Moved agency from AKS to Production Ogi.
- May 18 to 23 - Starred alongside Haruka Kohara (ex-SDN48 member) and Moeno Nito in Team Imagine's theater show "Ramerame" (らめらめ). It was her first leading role in a stage show.
- June 30 - Became a member of Watarirouka Hashiritai 7, a sub-unit consisting of AKB48 members attached to Production Ogi.
- July 27 - Officially debuted as a member of Team A.

2011

- March 20 - Following the tsunami in Japan, she was one of two AKB48 members to perform at the "Japan Aid" Concert at Hilton Guam. She sang "Sakura no Ki ni Narō".
- March 29 - Announced in Team A's theater show that she is moving agency from Production Ogi to Nagara Production, a big agency handling famous enka singers such as Kiyoshi Hikawa and Yutaka Yamakawa, to pursue her singing career as an enka singer.
- April 1 - Officially joined Nagara Production, but she remained an active member of Watarirouka Hashiritai 7.

2012

- February 1 - Released her first solo debut, "Mujin Eki" (無人駅; "Ghost Station") under Tokuma Japan Communications. She was the third AKB48 member to release a solo CD after Tomomi Itano and Atsuko Maeda, and the first enka singer in AKB48. She held her first solo release event on January 31 in Shinbashi Station Square.
- April 3 - Her first solo radio show "Konbanwasamin" (こんばんわさみん) started broadcasting on TBS channel every Wednesday at 3:30 am.
- June 6 - Ranked 33rd in AKB48 27th Single Senbatsu General Election, and became the center of Next Girls.
- July 29 - Held "Singing Mujin Eki (Ghost Station) in Ghost Station" event in Kuniyoshi Station of Izumi Railroad. After the event, she assumed the role of train conductor and rode the one-day only "Wasamin Train" (わさみん号) with 40 fans chosen by lottery.
- August 24 - During AKB48 in Tokyo Dome concert, it was announced that she will be moving to New Team B.
- October 20 - During "Mujin Eki Photo Contest Awarding" event, it was announced that she will release her 2nd single on early 2013.
- November 1 - Officially became a member of Team B.
- November 3 - Participated as a starting member of Team B's Waiting Show.

2013

- January 9 - Released her second solo single, "Moshimo Watashi ga Sora ni Sundeitara" (もしも私が空に住んでいたら; "If I were Living in the Sky") under Tokuma Japan Communications. She held release events every day for a week from January 7 to 13 in various places. She debuted 6th in Oricon Daily Ranking, but successfully ranked 5th in Oricon Weekly Ranking.

2014

- January 20 - Her single "鞆の浦慕情" debuted at number one on the weekly Oricon Singles Chart.
- In AKB48 Group Daisokaku Matsuri Shuffle held at February 24, 2014, It was announced that she will be moving to Team K.
- April 22 - Officially became a member of Team K

2015

- During AKB48's Spring Concert in Saitama Super Arena, it was announced that she will be transferred back to Team B.

2016

- January 30 - Announced her Graduation from AKB48 during her 21st Birthday and her Solo Concert, Iwasa Misaki 1st Concert ~Mujineki Kara Aratanaru Shuppatsu no Koku~

(岩佐美咲ファーストコンサート～無人駅から 新たなる出発の刻～)

- March 14 - Graduated from the group.
- March 21 - Her last activity from the group.

== Discography ==
=== AKB48 singles ===
2009

- "River"
  - "Hikoukigumo" (ひこうき雲) - Theater Girls

2010

- "Ponytail to Shushu"
  - "Nusumareta Kuchibiru" (盗まれた唇) - Under Girls
- "Heavy Rotation"
  - "Lucky Seven" (ラッキーセブン) - as a substitute of Miho Miyazaki in music video
- "Beginner"
  - "Boku Dake no Value" (僕だけのvalue) - Under Girls
- "Chance no Junban"
  - "Kurumi to Dialogue" (胡桃とダイアローグ) - Team A

2011

- "Sakura no Ki ni Narō"
  - "Area K" (エリアK) - DIVA
- "Everyday, Kachusha"
  - "Hito no Chikara" (人の力) - Under Girls
- "Kaze wa Fuiteiru"
  - "Kimi no Senaka" (君の背中) - Under Girls
- "Ue kara Mariko"
  - "Rinjin wa Kizutsukanai" (隣人は傷つかない) - Team A

2012

- "Give Me Five!"
  - "Hitsujikai no Tabi" (羊飼いの旅) - Special Girls B
- "Manatsu no Sounds Good!"
  - "Mitsu no Namida" (3つの涙) - Special Girls
  - "Kimi no Tame ni Boku wa..." (君のために僕は…) - only in Theater ver. CD
- "Gingham Check"
  - "Do Re Mi Fa Onchi" (ドレミファ音痴) - Next Girls
- "Uza"
  - "Seigi no Mikata Janai Hero" (正義の味方じゃないヒーロー) - Team B
- "Eien Pressure"
  - "Watashitachi no Reason" (私たちのReason) - only in Theater ver. CD

2013

- "So Long!"
  - "Sokode inu no unchi fun jau ka ne?" (そこで犬のうんち踏んじゃうかね？) - Team B
- "Sayonara Crawl"
  - "Romance Kenjuu" (ロマンス拳銃) - Team B

=== Watarirouka Hashiritai 7 ===
- "Valentine Kiss" (バレンタイン・キッス)
- "Hetappi Wink" (へたっぴウィンク)
- "Kibō Sanmyaku" (希望山脈)
- "Shōnen yo Uso o Tsuke!" (少年よ 嘘をつけ!)

=== Unit Songs in Theater ===
Team A 5th Stage "Ren'ai Kinshi Jorei" (チームA 5th Stage「恋愛禁止条例」公演)

- Squall no Aida ni (スコールの間に) as backdancer
- Manatsu no Christmas Rose (真夏のクリスマスローズ) as backdancer
- Ren'ai Kinshi Jorei (恋愛禁止条例) as substitute of Miho Miyazaki

Team K 4th Stage "Saishu Bell ga Naru" (チームK 4th Stage「最終ベルが鳴る」公演)

- Gomenne Jewel (ごめんねジュエル) as backdancer

Team B 3rd Stage "Pajama Drive" (チームB 3rd Stage「パジャマドライブ」公演)

- Junjou Shugi (純情主義) as backdancer

Team B 4th Stage "Idol no Yoake" (チームB 4th Stage「アイドルの夜明け」公演)

Substitute of Aika Ota in all songs

- Kataomoi no Taikakusen (片思いの対角線) as backdancer
- Tengoku Yarou (天国野郎) as backdancer

Team K 5th Stage "Sakaagari" (チームK 5th Stage「逆上がり」公演)

Substitute of Rina Chikano in all songs (when Yuko Oshima was absent)

- Ai no Iro (愛の色) as a substitute of Manami Oku

Team Trainee "Idol no Yoake" (研究生「アイドルの夜明け」公演)

- Kuchiutsushi no Chocolate (口移しのチョコレート)
- Tengoku Yarou (天国野郎) as backdancer

Theater G-Rosso "Yume o Shinaseru wake ni ikanai" (夢を死なせるわけにいかない」)

- Tonari no Banana (となりのバナナ) as stand-by for Tomomi Kasai, Reina Fujie, Aki Takajo, or Haruka Nakagawa

Team A 6th Stage "Mokugekisha" (チームA 6th Stage「目撃者」公演)

- Hoshi no Mukougawa (☆の向こう側)
- Ude o Kunde (腕を組んで) as substitute of Haruka Nakagawa or Atsuko Maeda

Team B Waiting Show (チームB ウェイティング公演)

- Gomenne Jewel (ごめんね ジュエル)

== Solo discography ==
=== Singles ===
| Release | Title | Copies Sold | Chart positions | | | Album |
| Release | Title | Copies Sold | Oricon Singles Charts | Billboard Japan Hot 100 | RIAJ digital tracks* | Album |
|---|---|---|---|---|---|---|
| February 1, 2012 | "Mujin Eki" (無人駅; "Ghost Station") | 53,204+ | 5 | 12 | TBA | TBA |
| January 9, 2013 | "Moshimo Watashi ga Sora ni Sundeitara" (もしも私が空に住んでいたら; "If I were living in the sky") | 25,382+ | 5 | TBA | TBA | TBA |
| January 8, 2014 | "Tomonoura Bojō" (鞆の浦慕情) | 20,139 | 1 | | | |
| April 29, 2015 | "Hatsusake" (初酒) | - | 13 | | | |

*RIAJ Digital Tracks established April 2009.
