= Rain (Sekai no Owari song) =

2017 single by Sekai no Owari

- Jacket art for the first limited edition A

Single by Sekai no Owari

from the album Mary and the Witch's Flower Original Soundtrack
- Language: Japanese
- B-side: "Stargazer"
- Released: July 5, 2017
- Label: Toy's Factory
- Composers: Nakajin; Fukase; Saori
- Lyricists: Fukase; Saori
- Producer: Sekai no Owari

Sekai no Owari singles chronology
"Hey Ho" (2016)	"Rain" (2017)	"Fukurō no Koe ga Kikoeru" (2017)

"Rain" is a song by Japanese pop band Sekai no Owari. It was released as the band's eleventh major label single on July 5, 2017, under Toy's Factory. The song was used as the theme song for the animated film Mary and the Witch's Flower (2017).

== Background and release ==
At the end of 2014, producer Yoshiaki Nishimura left Studio Ghibli, with director Hiromasa Yonebayashi, who had directed Arrietty and When Marnie Was There, leaving soon after. Nishimura founded Studio Ponoc in April 2015. In December 2016, teasers for Mary and the Witch's Flower, Studio Ponoc's first feature-length animated film, were released. Based on the children's novel The Little Broomstick by Mary Stewart, the film follows a young girl, Mary (voiced by Hana Sugisaki), who journeys into the world of witches. Production of "Rain" began at the end of 2016 with a meeting between the Sekai no Owari members, director Yonebayashi, and producer Nishimura, where the members were shown the storyboards and background art. After watching the film, the members wrote the song through repeated discussion with the director and producer. On June 8, 2017, during a live broadcast, Sekai no Owari announced that they would be in charge of the theme song for the animated film Mary and the Witch's Flower, set to release on July 8.

== Composition ==
"Generally speaking I think the 'rain' used metaphorically has a negative image, but this time I focused on 'was the rain that was falling in my heart for a long time really a bad thing?' I was thinking, 'what did the rain that was falling in her heart create?'"

— Fukase on his thoughts while creating the song

"Rain" is a "warm and nostalgic pop tune unique to [Sekai no Owari]". The song uses the piano, guitar, bass, drums, strings, and the hammered dulcimer, which was requested by the film's producer. Initially, Nakajin began working on a demo, and Fukase created the B-melody, with the chorus created from connecting the two ideas; Saori then refined the chorus. The lyrics were written "based on the weather in the heart of Mary", the film's protagonist. The members said they wrote the song hoping to "create a theme song that would make us want to take a step forward as Mary [the protagonist of the film] grows up".

== Track listing ==
No.	Title	Lyrics	Music	Arrangement	Length
1.	"Rain"	Fukase; Saori	Nakajin; Fukase; Saori	Takeshi Kobayashi; Shike Udai	5:11
2.	"Stargazer"	Fukase	Fukase	Sekai no Owari	3:53
3.	"SOS" (Jauz Remix)	Saori; Nelson Babin-Coy	Fukase		5:39
Total length:					14:43

== Charts ==
=== Weekly charts ===
Weekly chart performance for "Rain"
Chart (2017)	Peak position
Japan Hot 100 (Billboard)	2
Japan (Oricon)	2

=== Monthly charts ===
Monthly chart performance for "Rain"
Chart (2017)	Peak position
Japan (Oricon)	9

=== Year-end charts ===
Year-end chart performance for "Rain"
Chart (2017)	Peak position
Japan (Japan Hot 100)	20
Japan (Oricon)	63
Chart (2018)	Peak position
Japan (Japan Hot 100)	77
