= Yōkoso, Wagaya e =

- Promotional poster
- Also known as: Your Story; Welcome to Our Home
- Genre: Drama
- Written by: Tsutomu Kuroiwa
- Directed by: Isamu Nakae; Masaki Tanimura; Hideyuki Aizawa
- Starring: Masaki Aiba; Erika Sawajiri; Kasumi Arimura; Kaho Minami; Akira Terao
- Narrated by: Masaki Aiba; Erika Sawajiri
- Ending theme: "Aozora no Shita, Kimi no Tonari" by Arashi
- Country of origin: Japan
- Original language: Japanese
- No. of episodes: 10

Production
- Producer: Kenichi Hatori
- Running time: 54–69 minutes

Original release
- Network: Fuji TV
- Release: 13 April – 15 June 2015

Yōkoso, Wagaya e (ようこそ、わが家へ, Your Story) is a Japanese television drama series based on the mystery novel by Jun Ikeido. The novel was previously adapted for NHK Radio 1 in 2014. It premiered on Fuji TV from 13 April 2015 on Mondays at 21:00. On average, it received a viewership rating of 12.5%, and the final episode recorded the highest rating of 15.0%.

Masaki Aiba, who is a member of the Japanese idol group Arashi played the lead role for the first time in getsuku drama. Kasumi Arimura and Erika Sawajiri also appeared in a supporting role.

== Cast ==
- Masaki Aiba as Kenta Kurata
- Erika Sawajiri as Asuka Kandori, a reporter
- Kasumi Arimura as Nana Kurata, Kenta's sister
- Kaho Minami as Keiko Kurata, Kenta and Nana's mother
- Akira Terao as Taichi Kurata, Kenta and Nana's father
- Sayaka Yamaguchi as Setsuko Nishizawa
- Naoto Takenaka as Hiroki Mase
- Junji Takada as Michiharu Yagi
- Rika Adachi as Marie Hobara

== Episodes ==
No.	Title	Directed by	Original release date	Viewers (%)
1	"恐怖のゲームが今夜始まる"	Isamu Nakae	13 April 2015	13.0
2	"混迷する犯人像と謎の動機"	Isamu Nakae	20 April 2015	11.4
3	"遂に捉えたストーカーの姿!"	Isamu Nakae	27 April 2015	12.0
4	"ストーカー最接近!遂に家族の反撃が始まる!"	Masaki Tanimura	4 May 2015	10.0
5	"犠牲者発生!最弱のヒーローが遂に動き出す!"	Isamu Nakae	11 May 2015	11.9
6	"妹は絶対に守る!卑劣なストーカーと直接対決!"	Masaki Tanimura	18 May 2015	12.3
7	"健太を刺したのは誰?遂に犯人の正体が明らかに!"	Isamu Nakae	25 May 2015	13.4
8	"ゴメン、僕は母さんを守ることが出来なかった…"	Hideyuki Aizawa	1 June 2015	13.2
9	"あなたがやったんですよね。絶対に逃しませんから!"	Masaki Tanimura	8 June 2015	12.8
10	"恐怖の日々の終焉!全ての謎の答えが明らかに?"	Isamu Nakae	15 June 2015	15.0

Preceded by Date: Koitowa Donna Mono Kashira; 19 January 2015 – 23 March 2015	Fuji TV Getsuku Drama; Mondays 21:00 – 21:54 (JST)	Succeeded by Koinaka (20 July 2015 – 14 September 2015)
