= Eejanaika (song) =

- Regular Edition cover

Single by Johnny's WEST
- Released: April 23, 2014
- Recorded: 2014
- Genre: J-pop
- Length: 4:23
- Label: Johnny & Associates
- Songwriters: Takafumi Iwasaki, mildsalt

"Eejanaika" (ええじゃないか) is the debut single of the Japanese pop group Johnny's WEST. It was released on April 23, 2014. It reached number one on the Weekly Oricon Singles Chart. It was the 22nd best-selling single of the year in Japan, with 307,948 copies. On the theater performance of Naniwa Zamurai Hello Tokyo, the fans chose songs among 10-13 different songs, and through that Eejanaika was chosen.

== Track listing ==
First (Naniwa Zamurai) edition
No.	Title	Lyrics	Music	Length
1.	"Eejanaika (ええじゃないか)"	Takafumi Iwasaki, mildsalt	Takafumi Iwasaki	4:23
2.	"Banzai yume Mansai (バンザイ夢マンサイ!)" (Theme music for the movie Ninjani sanjou! Miraihe no tatakai.)	zopp	Susumu Kawaguchi, Joakim Bjornberg, Christofer Erixon	4:55
3.	"Eejanaika (ええじゃないか)" (Instrumental)	Takafumi Iwasaki, mildsalt	Takafumi Iwasaki	4:23
4.	"Banzai yume Mansai (バンザイ夢マンサイ!)" (Instrumental)		Susumu Kawaguchi, Joakim Bjornberg, Christofer Erixon	4:55
Total length:				18:06

First (Ninjani) edition
No.	Title	Lyrics	Music	Length
1.	"Eejanaika (ええじゃないか)"	Takafumi Iwasaki, mildsalt	Takafumi Iwasaki	4:23
2.	"Banzai yume Mansai (バンザイ夢マンサイ!)" (Theme music for the movie Ninjani sanjou! Miraihe no tatakai.)	zopp	Susumu Kawaguchi, Joakim Bjornberg, Christofer Erixon	4:55
3.	"Eejanaika (ええじゃないか)" (Instrumental)	Takafumi Iwasaki, mildsalt	Takafumi Iwasaki	4:23
4.	"Banzai yume Mansai (バンザイ夢マンサイ!)" (Instrumental)		Susumu Kawaguchi, Joakim Bjornberg, Christofer Erixon	4:55
5.	"Talk, digest from Ninjani sanjou! Miraihe no tatakai, behind the scenes." (DVD)

First (WEST) edition
No.	Title	Lyrics	Music	Length
1.	"Eejanaika (ええじゃないか)"	Takafumi Iwasaki, mildsalt	Takafumi Iwasaki	4:23
2.	"Banzai yume Mansai (バンザイ夢マンサイ!)" (Theme music for the movie Ninjani sanjou! Miraihe no tatakai.)	zopp	Susumu Kawaguchi, Joakim Bjornberg, Christofer Erixon	4:55
3.	"Eejanaika (ええじゃないか)" (Instrumental)	Takafumi Iwasaki, mildsalt	Takafumi Iwasaki	4:23
4.	"Banzai yume Mansai (バンザイ夢マンサイ!)" (Instrumental)		Susumu Kawaguchi, Joakim Bjornberg, Christofer Erixon	4:55
5.	"Eejanaika (ええじゃないか)" (music video and making-of DVD)

Regular edition
No.	Title	Lyrics	Music	Length
1.	"Eejanaika (ええじゃないか)"	Takafumi Iwasaki, mildsalt	Takafumi Iwasaki	4:23
2.	"Banzai yume Mansai (バンザイ夢マンサイ!)" (Theme music for the movie Ninjani sanjou! Miraihe no tatakai.)	zopp	Susumu Kawaguchi, Joakim Bjornberg, Christofer Erixon	4:55
3.	"Sono saki e... (その先へ…)"	Shusui	Shusui, Motoyama Seiji	5:03
4.	"Naniwa Ittōshō (浪速一等賞!)"	Kelly, Shingo Asari	Shingo Asari	3:50

MY BEST CD edition
No.	Title	Lyrics	Music	Length
1.	"Eejanaika (ええじゃないか)"	Takafumi Iwasaki, mildsalt	Takafumi Iwasaki	4:23
2.	"Rainbow Dream"	Kelly	TSUKASA	4:23
3.	"My Best Friend"	Shimoji Yu	Shimizu Akio	3:10

== Chart ==
Chart (2014)	Peak position
Billboard Japan Hot 100	1
Oricon Singles Chart	1
