= Tree (Sekai no Owari album) =

Studio album by Sekai no Owari
- Released: January 14, 2015
- Recorded: 2013–2014
- Genre: J-pop, pop, rock
- Length: 56:19
- Label: Toy's Factory
- Producer: Sekai no Owari

Sekai no Owari chronology
Entertainment (2012)	Tree (2015)	Lip (2019)

Singles from Tree
- 1. "RPG" Released: May 1, 2013; 2. "Death Disco" Released: October 30, 2013; 3. "Snow Magic Fantasy" Released: January 12, 2014; 4. "Honō to Mori no Carnival" Released: April 9, 2014

Tree is the third studio album by Japanese rock band Sekai no Owari. It was released on January 14, 2015. It debuted at number one on the weekly Oricon Albums Chart, with 247,964 copies sold.

== Track listing ==
No.	Title	Lyrics	Music	Arrangement	Length
1.	"The Bell"			Sekai no Owari; Chrysanthemum Bridge	0:38
2.	"Honō to Mori no Carnival" (炎と森のカーニバル)	Fukase	Fukase	Sekai no Owari; Chrysanthemum Bridge	4:58
3.	"Snow Magic Fantasy" (スノーマジックファンタジー)	Fukase	Nakajin	Sekai no Owari; Chrysanthemum Bridge	5:16
4.	"Moonlight Station" (ムーンライトステーション)	Fukase	Fukase	Sekai no Owari; Chrysanthemum Bridge	3:52
5.	"Earth Child" (アースチャイルド)	Saori	Nakajin	Sekai no Owari; Chrysanthemum Bridge	4:23
6.	"Mermaid Rhapsody" (マーメイドラプソディー)	Saori	Nakajin	Sekai no Owari; Chrysanthemum Bridge	6:20
7.	"Pierrot" (ピエロ)	Fukase	Fukase	Sekai no Owari; Chrysanthemum Bridge	5:38
8.	"Gingagai no Akumu" (銀河街の悪夢)	Fukase	Nakajin	Sekai no Owari; Chrysanthemum Bridge	6:22
9.	"Death Disco"	Fukase	Nakajin; Fukase	Sekai no Owari; Chrysanthemum Bridge	4:15
10.	"Broken Bone"	Fukase	Fukase	Sekai no Owari; Chrysanthemum Bridge	2:53
11.	"Play"	Saori	Saori	Sekai no Owari; Chrysanthemum Bridge	2:53
12.	"RPG"	Fukase; Saori	Fukase	Sekai no Owari; Chrysanthemum Bridge	4:51
13.	"Dragon Night"	Fukase	Fukase, Nicky Romero, Marcus Van Wattum	Sekai no Owari; Nicky Romero	3:49
Total length:					56:19
