= Guts! =

Single by Arashi

from the album The Digitalian
- B-side: "Fly"; "Kimi ga Waraeru Yō ni"; "Love Wonderland"
- Released: April 30, 2014
- Recorded: 2014
- Genre: Pop
- Label: J Storm
- Songwriters: Eltvo; S-Tnk; Sakra

Arashi singles chronology
"Bittersweet" (2014)	"Guts!" (2014)	"Daremo Shiranai" (2014)

"Guts!" is the 43rd single released by Japanese boy band Arashi. It was released on April 30, 2014. "Guts!" was used as the theme song for the drama Yowakutemo Katemasu starring Arashi member Kazunari Ninomiya. It was the sixth best-selling single of the year in Japan, with 604,654 copies. It was certified Double Platinum by the Recording Industry Association of Japan.

== Single information ==
The single was released in two editions: a limited edition including a bonus track and a bonus DVD with a music video for "Guts!", and a regular CD only edition including two bonus tracks and karaoke tracks for all the songs. The limited edition also contains a 12-page booklet.

== Chart performance ==
"Guts!" debuted at number one on the Oricon Singles Chart on May 12, 2014. It sold 501,493 copies in its first week, which pushed the group's all-time single sales to 20.081 million, making them the fifth male artist (after B'z, Mr. Children, SMAP, and Glay) to sell over 20 million singles. The single dropped to number three in its second week, selling 43,778 copies. It spent a further two weeks in the top ten and altogether 44 weeks in the Top 200. "Guts!" was the sixth best-selling single of the year in Japan, with 604,654 copies sold.

"Guts!" debuted at number 23 on the Billboard Japan Hot 100 on April 28, 2014. It rose to number 15 the following week and peaked at number one on May 12, 2014. It remained at number one in its fourth week. The song charted for 20 weeks. "Guts!" placed first on the year-end Japan Hot 100 chart and placed second on the year-end Top Single Sales chart.

In Taiwan, it peaked at number seven on the G-Music Combo chart, and number one on the J-pop chart.

On May 12, 2026, Billboard reported that the song had reached 100 million streams.

== Track listing ==
Regular edition
No.	Title	Lyrics	Music	Arrangement	Length
1.	"Guts!"	Eltvo; S-Tnk	Sakra	Tomoki Ishizuka	4:56
2.	"Kimi ga Waraeru Yō ni" (君が笑えるように)	Kosh; Macoto56	Kosh	Ha-j	4:44
3.	"Love Wonderland"	Akira	Akira; U-Ta	Akira; U-Ta	4:09
4.	"Guts!" (instrumental)				4:56
5.	"Kimi ga Waraeru Yō ni" (instrumental)				4:44
6.	"Love Wonderland" (instrumental)				4:05
Total length:					27:35

Limited edition
No.	Title	Lyrics	Music	Arrangement	Length
1.	"Guts!"	Eltvo; S-Tnk	Sakra	Ishizuka	4:56
2.	"Fly"	Hydrant	Yasushi Watanabe	Taku Yoshioka	3:35
3.	"Fly" (instrumental)				3:31
Total length:					12:03

Limited edition – DVD
No.	Title	Length
1.	"Guts!" (Music video)

== Charts ==
=== Weekly charts ===
Chart (2014)	Peak position
Japan (Oricon Singles Chart)	1
Japan (Japan Hot 100)	1
Taiwan (G-Music Combo Chart)	7
Taiwan (G-Music J-pop Chart)	1
South Korea (Gaon Album Chart)	57
South Korea (Gaon International Album Chart)	12

=== Year-end charts ===
Chart (2014)	Peak position
Japan (Oricon Singles Chart)	6
Japan (Japan Hot 100)	1
Taiwan (Hito Radio)	16
