= Bittersweet (Arashi song) =

- Regular edition cover

Single by Arashi
- B-side: "Road to Glory"; "Sync"; "Motto, Ima Yori"
- Released: February 12, 2014
- Recorded: 2014
- Genre: Pop
- Label: J Storm
- Songwriter(s): 100+

Arashi singles chronology
"Endless Game" (2013)	"Bittersweet" (2014)	"Guts!" (2014)

"Bittersweet" is the 42nd single released by Japanese boyband Arashi. "Bittersweet" was used as the theme song for the drama Shitsuren Chocolatier starring Arashi member Jun Matsumoto. The B-side "Road to Glory" was used as the theme song for Nippon TV's broadcast of the 2014 Winter Olympics. It was the 7th best-selling single of the year in Japan, with 591,847 copies.

== Single information ==
The single was released in two editions: a limited edition including Road to Glory and a bonus DVD with a music video for "Bittersweet", and a regular CD only edition including Road to Glory, two bonus tracks, and karaoke tracks for all the songs. The limited edition also contains a 16-page booklet.

It was announced on a music talk show that Arashi member Satoshi Ohno choreographed the dance for the live performance of "Bittersweet".

== Track listing ==
Regular edition
No.	Title	Lyrics	Music	Arrangement	Length
1.	"Bittersweet"	100+	100+	Tomoki Ishizuka	4:50
2.	"Road to Glory"	S-Tnk	Susumu Kawaguchi	Ha-j	3:59
3.	"Sync"	Takashi Ogawa; Sho Sakurai	U-Key Zone	Taku Yoshioka	4:47
4.	"Motto, Ima Yori" (もっと、いまより)	Youth Case	Youth Case	BJ Khan	3:47
5.	"Bittersweet" (instrumental)				4:50
6.	"Road to Glory" (instrumental)				3:59
7.	"Sync" (instrumental)				4:47
8.	"Motto, Ima Yori" (instrumental)				3:47

Limited edition
No.	Title	Lyrics	Music	Arrangement	Length
1.	"Bittersweet"	100+	100+	Ishizuka	4:50
2.	"Road to Glory"	S-Tnk	Kawaguchi	Ha-j	3:59

Limited edition – DVD
No.	Title	Length
1.	"Bittersweet" (Music video)	4:50

== Charts ==
Chart (2014)	Peak position
Japan (Oricon Singles Chart)	1
Japan (Billboard Japan Hot 100)	1
