= Sekai no Owari =

Japanese pop band

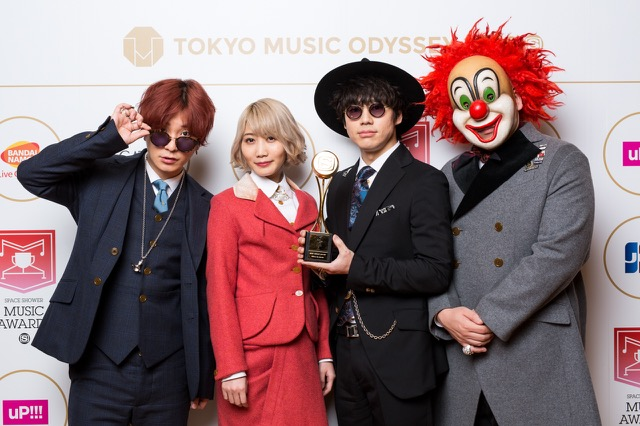
- SEKAI NO OWARI at Space Shower Music Awards in 2016. From left to right: Fukase, Saori, Nakajin and DJ Love.

Background information
- Also known as: End of the World
- Origin: Tokyo, Japan
- Genres: J-pop; experimental; indie pop; rock; jazz
- Years active: 2005–present
- Labels: Lastrum (2009–2010); Toy's Factory (2011–2020); Virgin Music (2020–present); Insanity Records (as End of the World, 2019–2020); Land Music (as End of the World, 2020-2023)
- Members: Nakajin; Fukase; Saori; DJ LOVE
- Website: sekainoowari.jp

Sekai no Owari (literally translated, "End of the World"; stylized in all caps) is a Japanese pop band from Tokyo. The band was formed in 2005 and has four members: Nakajin, Fukase, Saori, and DJ Love.

Since their debut, they have released 7 albums and various singles as well as featuring in their own documentary film Tokyo Fantasy. The band has performed at Nissan Stadium, Japan's largest concert venue, and are currently considered to be one of the biggest music acts from Japan. The band members have also produced and written content for several Japanese singers and groups, and lead vocalist Fukase has inspired a synthesized Vocaloid character of himself, known as Fukase.

The band has collaborated with other artists such as DNCE, Owl City, Nicky Romero, Epik High, Steve Aoki, Marieme, Niki, Clean Bandit, Gabrielle Aplin, Haywyre and Aloe Blacc.

== History ==
=== 2007–2009: Formation and indie debut ===
Fukase and Saori knew each other since kindergarten and met Nakajin in primary school. Together the three began a cover band at an early age while still in high school inspired by senior professional bands such as Bump of Chicken. Later, they met DJ Love who was added to original line-up as a DJ, replacing Fukase who was meant to take on the concept of a clown, and Fukase became the lead vocalist while Nakajin and Saori became the guitarist and pianist of the band, respectively. Starting out as an indie band, they performed their first live concert at their own-made live house "Club Earth" with 15 people attending. The band self-produced their first demo, Sekai no Owari, with a limited edition of 1,000 copies. Fukase, vocalist, named the band Sekai no Owari because "Once you've experienced the bottom, you have to find a way to go up. So I named my band End of the World to create the strength [I needed] through the music."

=== 2010–2011: First album, Nippon Budokan and major label debut ===
Sekai no Owari released their first album Earth under the independent label Lastrum in 2010. The album reached number 15 in the Oricon Weekly Album charts and the band started to become popular in the Japanese indie scene.

The band started touring Japan with their first two tours "Heart the Earth Tour" and "One-Man fall tour" while simultaneously releasing their first double A-side single "Tenshi to Akuma/Fantasy", which peaked at number 8 on the Oricon Single charts. In August 2011, Sekai no Owari performed a solo concert at the Nippon Budokan and signed to the major label Toy's Factory.

The band changed their original name '世界の終わり(Sekai no Owari)' to the romanized version Sekai no Owari.

=== 2012–2014: Entertainment, nationwide tours and increasing popularity ===
After signing to Toy's Factory, Sekai no Owari released two singles in 2011. The singles titled "Inori" and "Starlight Parade" reached number 13 and 16 respectively. The band embarked in their next tour "Sekai no Owari Tour 2011". The next year they released their next single "Nemurihime" (眠り姫, "Sleeping Beauty") which reached number 4 in the Oricon Single charts and was set to be included in the new album the band was working on.

In July 2012, the band released their second album and first major studio album Entertainment which reached number 2 in the Oricon charts. To support the album release, the band also toured "Arena Tour 2013 Entertainment in Kokuritsu Yoyogi Daiichi Taiikukan" and "Arena Tour 2013 Entertainment". The band went on to release two more singles in 2013, the first 'RPG' reached number 2 in the Oricon charts and number 1 on the Billboard Japan Hot 100 and was later given the double platinum certification by RIAJ for over 250,000 copies sold. The second single "Death Disco" was released as a digital single only and reached number 20 in the Billboard Japan Hot 100.

In 2013, they performed their first-ever outdoor-live-event, "Fire and Forest Carnival", gathering a total of 60,000 people, their largest audience at that moment.

After finishing their tour activities, Sekai no Owari resumed recording activities releasing three different singles during 2014. The first single "Snow Magic Fantasy" reached number 1 and was certified gold by the RIAJ. The next single "Honou to Mori no Carnival" (炎と森のカーニバル, "The Flame and Forest Carnival") was released almost three months after and reached number 2 in the Oricon charts being certified gold once again by the RIAJ. In October 2014, the band collaborated with Owl City on a new song, titled "Tokyo". It was released on Republic Records, a division of UMG Recordings, Inc. The song was later put on Owl City's fifth studio album, Mobile Orchestra, in Japan. In November, they released a single "Dragon Night", which was produced by Dutch DJ Nicky Romero.

On August 15, 2014, Tokyo Fantasy, a 90-minute film featuring the band members was released nationwide in Japan. It was directed by French filmmaker Raphaël Frydman and later made available on DVD.

=== 2015–present: Tree, overseas activities and international debut ===
In January 2015, Sekai no Owari released their third album, Tree 2 years and 7 months after their previous album. The album topped the chart at No. 1, and reached 1 million sales in total of physical sales and digital downloads.

In June 2015, an English version of their hit song "Dragon Night" was released in their YouTube channel in June. In July 2015, Sekai no Owari held a two-day show, "Twilight City", at Nissan Stadium. "Twilight City" was a two-day event with attendance of 140,000 and is to date their biggest audience received. American pop-star Austin Mahone joined the show as a guest act.

Their following singles "Anti-Hero" and "SOS" were used as the theme songs of the movies Attack on Titan and Attack on Titan: End of the World, respectively and they both sold 100,000 copies with 'SOS' reaching again number one in the Oricon album charts being the third time the band achieves so. Both songs are performed fully in English.

In August 2015, it was announced that a Vocaloid vocal for the Vocaloid 4 engine based on Fukase would be produced.

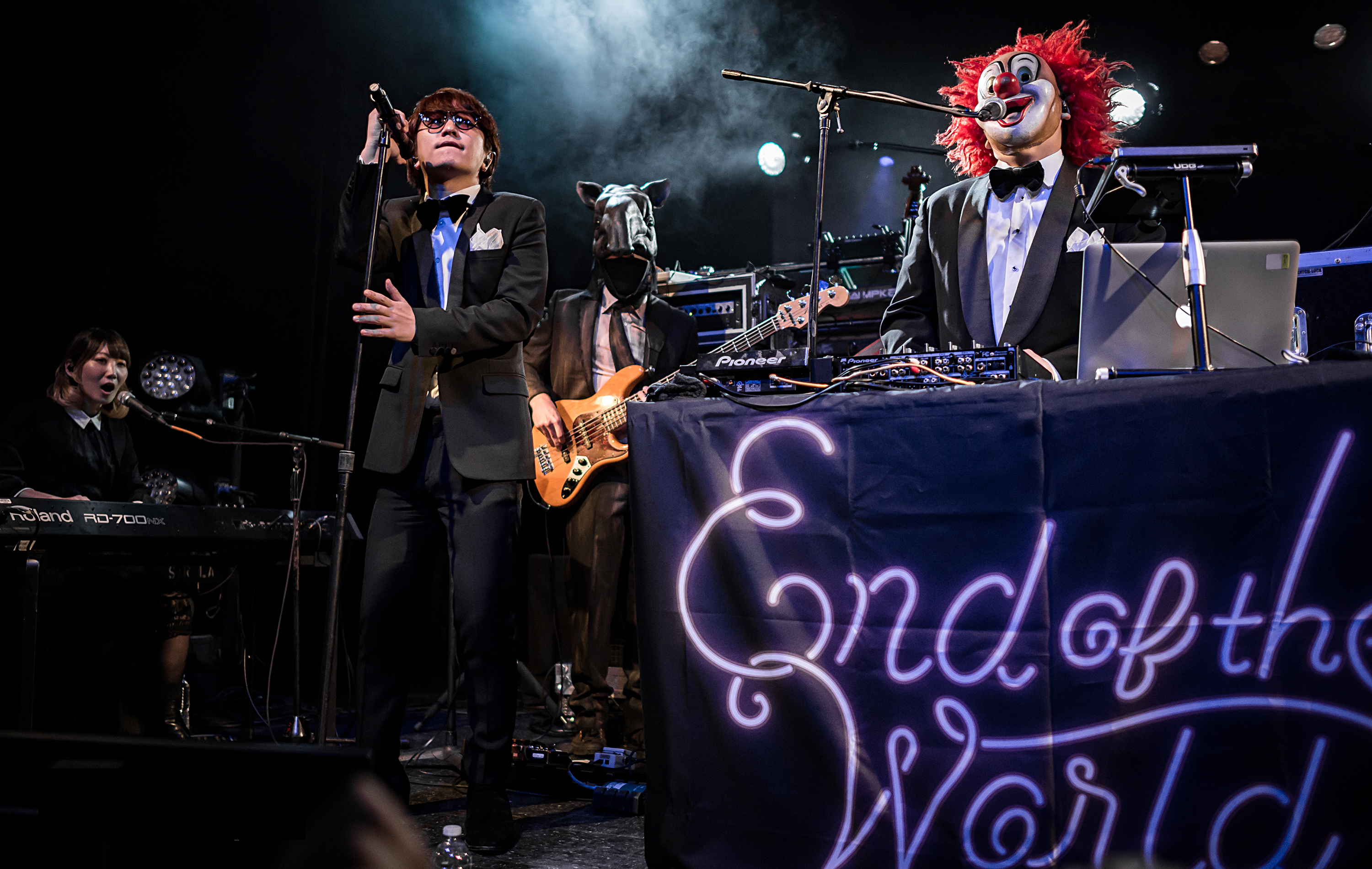
Sekai no Owari performing as support act to Clean Bandit in 2016.

In September 2015, Sekai no Owari became the first Japanese act to perform for MTV World Stage Malaysia 2015 in front of 20,000 people. They performed 5 songs: Anti-Hero, Death Disco, SOS, Mr. Heartache and Dragon Night. Later on Sekai no Owari held a special live event in Taiwan supported by KKBOX and was also invited to perform at Taiwan's prestigious 'KKBOX Music Awards' representing Japan.

In March 2016, Sekai no Owari announced their plans to debut in the United States and work on an English language album that was initially planned for 2017. In December 2018, the members announced on social media that their English album, Chameleon, would be released in spring 2019 using the English version of their name "End of the World", working with famous producers Nicky Romero, Clean Bandit, and Owl City. The band released two Japanese albums on February 27, 2019: Eye (showcasing the band's wild side) and Lip (featuring their signature pop sound). Chameleon was released on November 27, 2020.

On December 30, 2022, "Habit" earned Sekai no Owari the Grand Prix at the 64th Japan Record Awards.

Their song "Present" was in the Japanese dub of Inside Out 2.

== Musical style ==
Sekai no Owari started as an alternative rock band but later adopted concepts of J-pop and experimented with other genres. The band expressed their wish "not to be thrown into any particular box..." and attempted to develop a diverse style. The band's music ranges from electro-pop to jazz, rock and classical music, merging them into a fantasy-inspired concept.

Sekai no Owari performs internationally as "End of the World". They have a number of songs which are in English, in order to better reach an international audience. The band has stated in interviews that they feel a non-Japanese audience will not connect as well with Japanese (language) music, and so they try to write English language music from a different perspective.

Guitarist and sound producer Nakajin has also contributed vocals. He wrote and performed "Tonight" and "Honou no Senshi" (lit. "warrior of flame"), from Sekai no Owari's second album, Entertainment, as well as "Goodbye," from their album Lip, and "Doppelganger," from their album Eye. Nakajin also performed vocals on and wrote the lyrics for "Kaleidoscope," a B-side track from the 2020 single "silent." Sekai no Owari's 2021 album scent of memory also features a solo song from Nakajin, titled "Masayume."

== Band members ==
- Nakajin – Shinichi Nakashima (中島 真一, Nakashima Shinichi) – leader, vocals, chorus (backing vocals), sound production, guitar, stringed instruments
- Fukase – Satoshi Fukase (深瀬 慧, Fukase Satoshi) – lead vocals, group conceptor, guitar, bass
- Saori – Saori Ikeda (池田 彩織, Ikeda Saori) piano, accordion, stage production, vocals, chorus (backing vocals)
- DJ LOVE – real name unknown – DJ, drums, sound choice, comedic talk, bass

== Discography ==
=== Album ===
- Earth (2010)
- Entertainment (2012)
- Tree (2015)
- Lip (2019)
- Eye (2019)
- Chameleon [End of the World] (2020)
- scent of memory (2021)
- Nautilus (2024)

== Tours ==
=== Japan tours ===
- Heart the eartH Tour (2010)
- One-Man Fall Tour (2010)
- Sekai No Owari at Nippon Budokan!!! (2011)
- Sekai no Owari Tour 2011 (2011)
- Sekai no Owari Zepp Tour 2012 "Entertainment" (2012)
- Sekai no Owari Hall Tour 2012 "Entertainment" (2012)
- Sekai no Owari Arena Tour 2013 "Entertainment" (2013)
- Fire and Forest Carnival (2013)
- Arena Tour "Fire and Forest Carnival: Starland Edition" (2014)
- Tokyo Fantasy [with Owl City] (2014)
- Twilight City [with Austin Mahone] (2015)
- The Dinner Tour (2016)
- Tarkus Tour (2017)
- INSOMNIA TRAIN Tour (2018)
- The Colors Tour (2019)
- ~~Dome Tour 2020 "Du Gara Di Du" (2020)~~ → Cancelled (due to COVID-19)
- Tour 2021-2022 "Blue Planet Orchestra" (2021)
- Dome Tour 2022 "Du Gara Di Du" (2022)
- Fanclub Tour 2023 "Fafrotskies ~The Fan~" (2023)
- Zepp Tour 2023 "Terminal" (2023)
- Arena Tour 2024 "Shinkai (Deep sea in Japanese)" (2024)
- "Instant Radio" Fanclub Tour 2025 (2025)
- "THE CINEMA" Dome Tour 2026 (2025)

=== World tours ===
- Sekai no Owari U.S Tour (2016)
- The Colors Asia Tour 2019 (2019)
- "Phoenix" Asia Tour 2025 (2025)

== Festivals and events ==
- Summer Sonic Festival (2014)
- MTV World Stage Malaysia (2015)
- Sekai no Owari Special Live Show in Taiwan (2015)
- KKBOX Music Awards (2016)
- Jisan Valley Rock Festival South Korea (2016)
- Concrete & Grass Music Festival in Shanghai (2016)
- Clockenflap Music and Arts Festival Hong Kong (2016)

== Awards ==
Year	Ceremony	Award	Nominee/Work	Result
2011	3rd CD Shop Awards	Sub Grand Prix	"EARTH"	Won
2012	54th Japan Record Awards	Excellent Album Award	"ENTERTAINMENT"	Won
2013	5th CD Shop Awards	Finalist Award	"ENTERTAINMENT"	Won
2014	56th Japan Record Awards	Excellent Work Award	"炎と森のカーニバル, "The Flame and Forest Carnival""	Won
2014	MTV VMAJ	Best Karaokee! Song	"RPG"	Nominated
2015	57th Japan Record Awards	Excellent Album Award	"Tree"	Won
2015	MTV VMAJ	Best Group Video	"ANTI-HERO"	Nominated
2015	Space Shower Music Video Awards	Best Artist of the Year		Won
2015	MTV Europe Music Award	Best Japanese Act		Nominated
2016	58th Japan Record Awards	Best Arranger Award	"Hey Ho"	Won
2016	Space Shower Music Video Awards	Best Group Artist		Won
2016	2016 Mnet Asian Music Awards	Best Asian Artist Japan		Won
2017	59th Japan Record Awards	Excellent Work Award	"Rain"	Won
2017	Space Shower Music Video Awards	Best Live Production		Won
2017	Space Shower Music Video Awards	Best Pop Artist		Nominated
2018	60th Japan Record Awards	Excellent Work Award	"Sazanka"	Won
2019	Space Shower Music Video Awards	Best Live Production		Won
2019	Space Shower Music Video Awards	Best Pop Artist		Nominated
2022	Space Shower Music Video Awards	Best Pop Artist		Nominated
2022	64th Japan Record Awards	Grand Prix	"Habit"	Won
