= 41st Yokohama Film Festival =

Art event in Japan

- Location: Yokohama, Kanagawa, Japan
- Founded: 1980
- Festival date: 2 February 2020

The 41st Yokohama Film Festival (第４１回ヨコハマ映画祭) was held on 2 February 2020 at Yokohama, Kanagawa, Japan. The awards ceremony was held in the city's Kannai Hall, the results having been announced on 30 November 2019.

== Awards ==
- Best Film: - It Feels So Good
- Best Director:
  - Kei Ishikawa - Listen to the Universe
  - Rikiya Imaizumi - Just Only Love, Little Nights, Little Love
- Yoshimitsu Morita Memorial Best New Director: Shinzo Katayama - Siblings of the Cape
- Best Screenplay: Junji Sakamoto - Another World
- Best Cinematographer: Hidetoshi Shinomiya - From Miyamoto to You, Farewell Song
- Best Actor: Sosuke Ikematsu - From Miyamoto to You
- Best Actress:
  - Mugi Kadowaki - Farewell Song
  - Nana Komatsu - Farewell Song
- Best Supporting Actor: Ryo Narita - Just Only Love, Farewell Song
- Best Supporting Actress: Chizuru Ikewaki - Another World
- Best Newcomer:
  - Kumi Takiuchi - It Feels So Good
  - Ouji Suzuka - Listen to the Universe
  - Rairu Sugita - Another World
  - Anna Yamada - Little Love Song
- Special Grand Prize: Haruhiko Arai

== Top 10 ==
1. It Feels So Good'
2. Listen to the Universe
3. Just Only Love
4. From Miyamoto to You
5. Another World
6. The Journalist
7. One Night
8. Siblings of the Cape
9. A Girl Missing
10. Farewell Song

runner-up: Sea of Revival
