= Oreskaband =

Japanese ska band

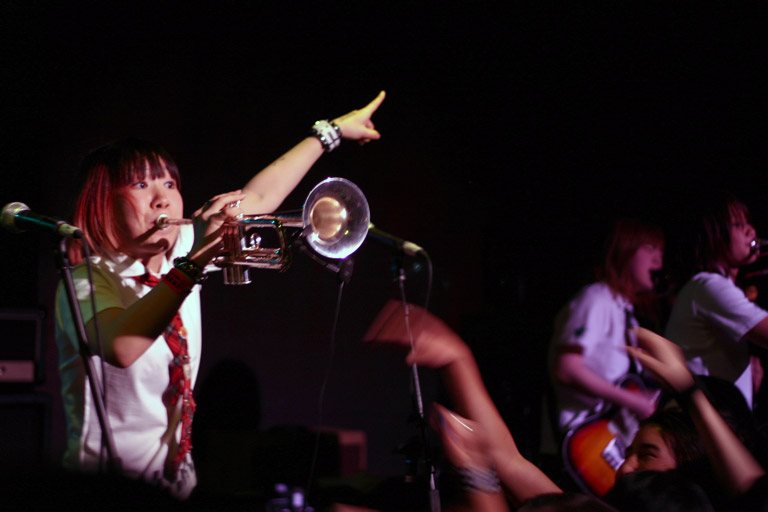
- Oreskaband in Austin, Texas, during SXSW Asia's JapanNite US tour.

Background information
- Origin: Sakai, Japan
- Genres: Ska punk; 2-tone
- Years active: 2003-present
- Label: Sony Music Japan
- Members: iCas; Tae; Hayami; Add
- Past members: Morico; Saki; Tomi; CC; Yume
- Website: oreskaband.com

Oreskaband (Japanese: オレスカバンド, Hepburn: Oresukabando; stylized as ORESKABAND) is a Japanese all-female ska band from Sakai. As well as performing regularly within Japan, they have toured in North and South America, as well as Europe.

== History ==
=== Origins (2003–2006) ===
Oreskaband began in 2003 when the members were still in middle school. Ikasu saw Tae playing in a local band and asked her to form a new one with her and some of their other friends. The band initially performed as Oretachi Kasukasu Lawson Ska Band with Cutter Shirts (俺たちカスカスローソンスカバンドウィズカッターシャツ), which was abbreviated to its current form by the time of their first release. They self-produced their first album, Penpal, in 2005 and were signed by Sony Music in 2006 while they were still in high school.

=== Major label years and international success (2006–2014) ===
The band received media attention from their appearance in a commercial advertising the popular Japanese snack Pocky. In July 2006, their major debut EP Ore was released and a month later, they appeared at the Fuji Rock Festival attracting 1,000 attendees, a record for a new artist. In March 2007, the band members graduated from high school and toured in the United States appearing in Austin, Los Angeles, and San Francisco as part of the Japan Nite tour. In April 2007, their song, "Tsumasaki" (爪先, Tiptoe), was featured as the 11th ending for the anime Bleach. In May, they released their first full-length album, WAO!!. They performed at Anime Expo in Long Beach, California in July 2007 and participated in the 2008 Vans Warped Tour. Oreskaband starred in the film Lock and Roll Forever, which was set for a 2008 release in Japan. Despite the involvement of several individuals associated with the High School Musical franchise, including producers Bill Borden and Barry Rosenbush, screenwriter Peter Barsocchini and actor Lucas Grabeel in a starring role, as well as a cameo appearance from Joan Jett, the film's Japanese release never materialised, and following the US premiere it did not resurface until 2013 as a direct-to-DVD release in Scandinavia. The band released their second full-length album, Color in 2010, and the single "Jitensha" (自転車, Bicycle) was featured as the 13th ending song of Naruto: Shippuden. In 2013 the band were featured on AKB48 member Mayu Watanabe's fourth solo single, "Rappa Renshūchū". The band's final release on the Sony label would be their 2014 compilation, Oreskaband Best [2003-2013], compiling songs from the band's first decade.

=== Victor signing and lineup changes (2014–present) ===
In 2014, Oreskaband signed to Victor Music Arts, the mini album Carry On! being the band's first release on the label. Their international activities continued, with a US performance at Otakon in 2015, as well as an appearance on BBC Radio in the UK and the band's first independent US performance at the Gramercy Theater in New York City. In 2015, long-time saxophonist and keyboardist Morico began a hiatus from the band in anticipation of getting married and giving birth; she later announced her official departure in January 2016. Saxophonist ADD served as a support member following Morico's departure, and would become a full member of the band in June 2016, in time to participate in the writing and recording of the band's third full-length studio album, Slogan, which was released in November 2016. This configuration of the band's horn section made a guest appearance on The Autocratics' 2017 self-titled album, including the duet "On the Rainy Night", which featured vocals from iCas. The band also made their first European tour in 2017, performing in the Czech Republic, Germany, Austria, Italy, Switzerland and at the Rencontres Trans Musicales in France.

In December 2018 it was announced that trumpeter Saki would be taking time off from Oreskaband to pursue a songwriting career, subsequently joining Tokyo-based skacore band Mayson's Party in February 2021. Trumpeter Hisae Ōtomari took her place as a support member from January until October 2019. At the band's Stay Irie, Go Rudy event in October 2019, they announced the new addition of keyboardist CC to their lineup as a full member. This lineup would prove short-lived, as bassist Tomi announced in February 2020 that she would be leaving to pursue other musical endeavors, following a final pair of performances with the band in Tokyo and their hometown of Sakai, Osaka Prefecture scheduled for that April. The COVID-19 pandemic led to the postponement of both concerts until August. Owing to the continued impact of the pandemic, the performances were ultimately livestreamed without an audience present, with Luck Life appearing as the support band for the Tokyo concert, while Gelugugu were scheduled to support Oreskaband at the Sakai concert, but cancelled their appearance due to the pandemic.

Tomi played her final show as a member of Oreskaband on 16 August 2020, and her role was filled in subsequent performances by support member Aki Kawano, with additional support member Natsuka Emi on trumpet from December 2020, bringing the band's onstage lineup to seven members for the first time and ending the trumpet's brief absence from their instrumentation. At a Shinjuku performance on 1 July 2021, the band announced their new full-time bassist, Yume. This lineup, however, would only last for two months, as the band announced on 31 August that CC's two-year tenure with the band had come to an end, with CC and the band citing the prolonged impact of the COVID-19 pandemic on their ability to coordinate and work as a band throughout much of this period as a key reason, as well as CC's ambitions as a solo artist. In the same announcement, the band also mentioned that they were preparing to release an album, featuring songs written with CC.

Between November 2021 and January 2022, the band released the singles "I'll Be There", "She" and "Stormy", the last of these three releases on 12 January 2022 accompanied by the official announcement of the band's fourth full-length album, titled Bohemia, which was released on 2 March 2022.

In August 2022, bassist Yume announced that she would be taking time away from the band after being diagnosed with an adjustment disorder. This ultimately culminated in her departure from the band in January 2023. She explained that it would still be some time before she could resume her role in the band, and she did not wish to make fans await her return indefinitely.

== Members ==
- iCas - vocals and guitar (2003-, credited as "Ikasu" on releases prior to Hot Number)
- Hayami - trombone and MC (2003-, credited as "Leader" on releases prior to "Jitensha")
- Tae - drums (2003-, credited as "Tae-san" on releases prior to Color)
- ADD - tenor saxophone (2016-)

Former Members

- Morico - tenor saxophone and keyboard (2003-2016)
- Saki - trumpet (2003-2018)
- Tomi - bass and vocals (2003-2020)
- CC - keyboard (2019-2021)
- Yume - bass (2021-2023)

Support Members

- Hisae Ōtomari - trumpet (2019)
- Aki Kawano - bass (2020-2021)
- Natsuka Emi - trumpet (2020-)
- Miru Yamamoto - trumpet (2021)

== Discography ==
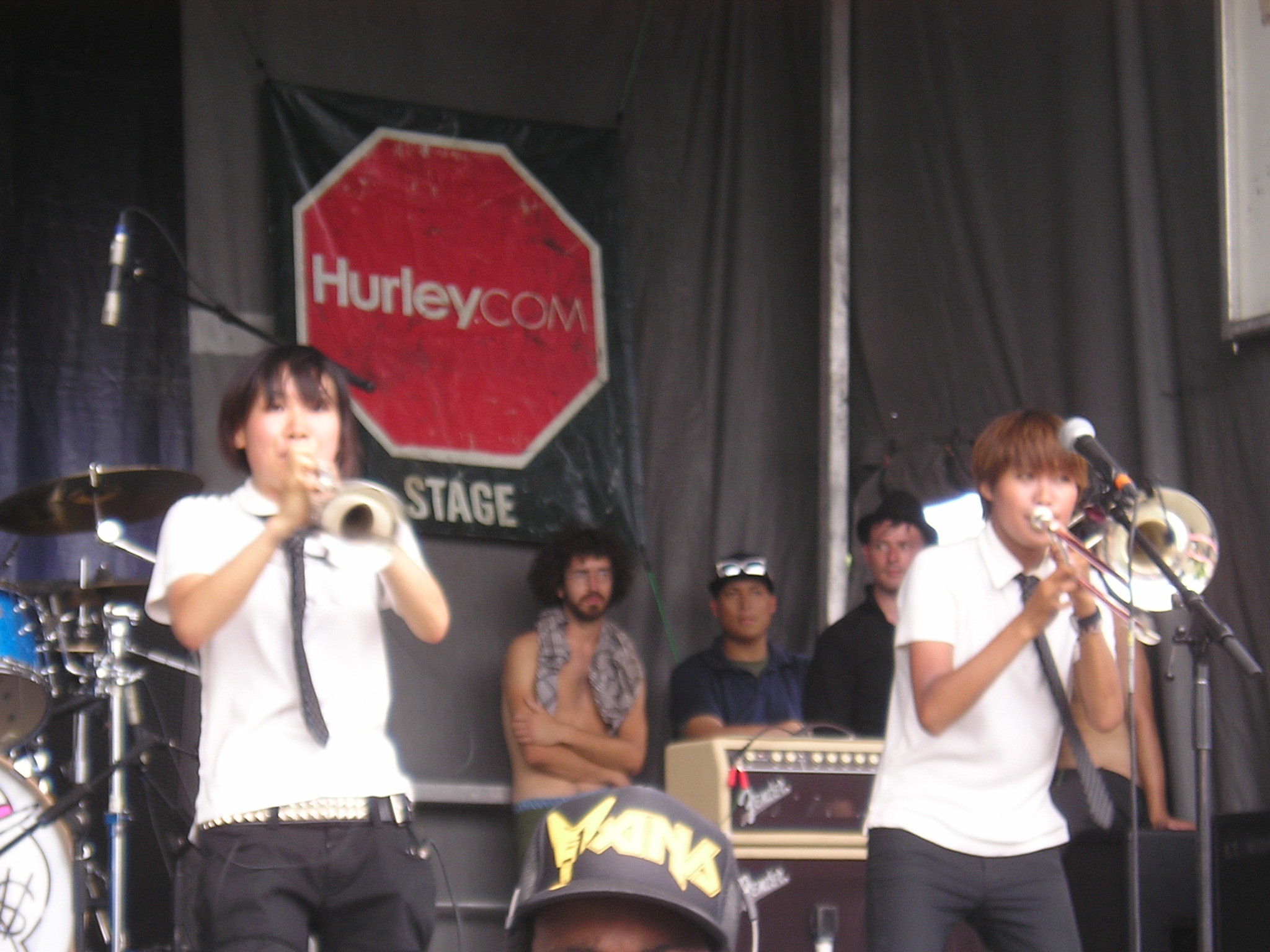
Oreskaband performing on Vans Warped Tour in 2008

=== Singles ===
- ''Almond'' (November 1, 2006)
- ''Wasuremono" / "Chuck'' (March 7, 2007)
- ''Tsumasaki'' (May 9, 2007)
- ''Jitensha'' (April 27, 2010)
- "NEXSPOT" / "¡Fiebre!" (March 9, 2016)
- "Groovin' Work Stylee" (November 3, 2017)
- ''Itokashi'' (October 10, 2018)
- ''Egao no Manma'' (April 17, 2019) (Begin cover)
- ''I'll Be There'' (November 10, 2021)
- ''She'' (December 1, 2021)
- ''Stormy'' (January 12, 2022)
- ''Wonder Neighbor'' (February 2, 2022)
- ''Wacha'' (April 19, 2023)
- ''Rollin' Rollin''' (June 21, 2023)

=== Albums and EPs ===
- Penpal (ペンパル) (independent) (2005)
- Ore (俺) (July 19, 2006)
- WAO!! (May 23, 2007)
- What a Wonderful World Vol.1 (October 22, 2008)
- What a Wonderful World Vol.2 (April 15, 2009)
- Color (November 24, 2010)
- Hot Number (February 27, 2013)
- Oreskaband Best [2003-2013] (February 26, 2014)
- Carry On! (Independent) (September 10, 2014)
- Slogan (November 23, 2016)
- Bohemia (March 2, 2022)

=== Collaborations ===
- "Rappa Renshūchū" (ラッパ練習中) (July 10, 2013) (Mayu Watanabe featuring Oreskaband)
- "SURVIVOR" / "up&down my heart" (July 6, 2022) (Rioka Kanda x Oreskaband)
