= Setona Mizushiro =

Japanese comic artist

- Born: 23 October 1971 (age 54); Fujisawa, Kanagawa
- Occupation: Manga artist
- Website: www.page.sannet.ne.jp/setona

Setona Mizushiro (Japanese: 水城 せとな, Hepburn: Mizushiro Setona) is a Japanese manga artist. In 1985 she participated in the publication of a dōjinshi. She remained active in that world until her debut in 1993 with the short story Fuyu ga Owarou Toshiteita (Winter Was Ending) that ran in Shogakukan's magazine, Puchi Comic.

In 2008, her gender bender psychological thriller After School Nightmare won her some of the acclaim she has back home after the Young Adult Library Services Association named it one of the best graphic novels for teenagers. The same work was also nominated for the 2007 Eisner Award for Best U.S. Edition of International Material (Japan).

Though her current drawing style is high in aesthetic value, her earlier works had less finesse. Regardless, her popularity grew largely due to her storytelling. Her works are noted for their slightly askew plots and exploration of the human psyche. Even her lighthearted Shōjo works usually have darker underlying elements. X-Day follows a group of teens whose mounting stress during senior year finals culminates in a plan to blow up their high school; the author has indicated that the series was written in response to the Columbine High School massacre. In her After School Nightmare series, she explores both sexual and gender identity issues. After was so successful in France that the French publisher released an exact replica of the key in the series as a limited edition gift. This led to a fierce online bidding war amongst Japanese fans, with the keys selling for outrageous prices.

In 2006 she released The Cornered Mouse Dreams of Cheese. Keiko Takemiya, professor of Kyoto Seika University and one of the members of the Year 24 Group, called it one of the best work published of the BL genre, despite the S&M theme. Widespread success has also followed critical acclaim with many readers rating the work five stars out of a possible 5 on Amazon.jp.

Her series Shitsuren Shokoratie (失恋ショコラティエ, Heartbroken Chocolatier) was awarded in May 2012 with the 36th Kodansha Manga Award in the category Shōjo.

Her works largely involve the individual's search for authenticity, self-knowledge and personal identity, themes that mirror her favourite author Hermann Hesse's works. Her works include shōjo, josei, and yaoi, and have been translated into many languages, including Chinese, English, French and German.

== Works ==
- Higan Sugi Made (彼岸過迄) (1994)
- Sleeping Beauty (スリーピングビューティー) (1994)
- Itsuka Suki da to itte (いつか好きだと言って, Someday Tell Me You Love Me) (1995)
- Violinist (ヴァイオリニスト) 2 volumes (1995)
- Mister Mermaid (ミスター マーメイド) (1996)
- 1999 Nen Shichi no Gatsu ~ Shanghai (1999年七の月〜上海, The Seventh Month in 1999 – Shanghai) 4 volumes (1998)
- Dōsei Ai Drama CD (同棲愛 ドラマ CD) (1999)
- Dōsei Ai (同棲愛) 11 volumes (2001) (2010 reprint)
- 100 Man Doru no Onna (100万ドルの女) (1997)
- Futari no Tame ni Sekai wa Aru no。 (ふたりのために世界はあるの。, The World Exists for Just Us Two) (1998)
- Soko wa Nemuri no Mori (そこは眠りの森, There Lies the Sleeping Forest) (1998)
- Shōjo Ningyo (少女人形, Doll Girl) (1999)
- Allegro Agitato (アレグロ・アジタート) 2 volumes (2000)
- Automatic Angel (オートマチック・エンジェル) 2 volumes (2000)
- TWINS (2000)
- Maison de Beauties (メゾン・ド・ビューティーズ) 3 volumes (2002)
- Kanojo tachi no X Day (彼女達のエクス・デイ) 2 volumes (2003)
- Shokubutsu Zukan (植物図鑑) (2004)
- Shōjo Mangaka-san Chino Neko (少女漫画家さんちの猫) (2004)
- Diamond Head (ダイアモンド・ヘッド) 5 volumes (2004)
- S (エス) 3 volumes (2004)
- Kyūso wa Chiizu no Yume o Miru (窮鼠はチーズの夢を見る, The Cornered Mouse Dreams of Cheese) (2006)
- Hōka-go Hokenshitsu (放課後保健室, After School Clinic) 10 volumes (2008)
- Shitsuren Shokoratie (失恋ショコラティエ, Heartbroken Chocolatier) 6 volumes (ongoing) (2008)

Licensed in French as Heartbroken Chocolatier by Asuka

- Kuro Bara Alice (黒薔薇アリス, Black Rose Alice) 6 volumes (on hold) (2008)
- Sojou no Koi wa Nido Haneru (俎上の鯉は二度跳ねる, The Carp on the Chopping Block Jumps Twice) 1 volume (2009) – sequel to Kyūso wa Chiizu no Yume wo Miru
- Nōnai Poizun Berii (脳内ポイズンベリー, Cerebral Poison Berry) 4 volumes (ongoing) (2011)
