= Shitsuren Chocolatier =

Japanese manga series by Setona Mizushiro

- Cover of the first volume of Shitsuren Chocolatier as published by Shogakukan

失恋ショコラティエ (Shitsuren Shokoratie)
- Genre: Romance, slice-of-life
- Manga
- Written by: Setona Mizushiro
- Published by: Shogakukan
- Imprint: Flower Comics Alpha
- Magazine: Rinka (2008–2010); Monthly Flowers (2010–2014)
- Original run: February 14, 2008 – December 27, 2014
- Volumes: 9
- Television drama
- Directed by: Hiroaki Matsuyama; Shōgo Miyaki; Munenori Sekino; Shunsuke Shinada; Kazutaka Ohara
- Written by: Naoko Adachi; Miyako Koshikawa
- Music by: Ken Arai
- Original network: Fuji TV
- Original run: January 13, 2014 – March 24, 2014
- Episodes: 11

Shitsuren Chocolatier (Japanese: 失恋ショコラティエ, Hepburn: Shitsuren Shokoratie; lit. "Heartbroken Chocolatier"), also known by its French subtitle Un chocolatier de l'amour perdu, is a Japanese manga series written and illustrated by Setona Mizushiro. It was serialized in Shogakukan's Rinka magazine starting in 2008, moving to Monthly Flowers magazine in 2010 where it completed its serialization in 2014. Shogakukan collected the individual chapters into nine bound volumes published from January 2009 to February 2015. The manga was also adapted into a live-action Japanese television drama starring Arashi's Jun Matsumoto in the lead role. It aired for eleven episodes on Fuji TV from January to March 2014.

== Plot ==
Sōta Koyurugi is the son of a baker who owns a cake shop. While a high school student, he fell in love with Saeko Takahashi, the most popular and beautiful girl in school and one year his senior. Saeko only dates handsome men with power, position, and popularity in their school; therefore Sōta, being rather quiet and pale, chased after her from afar like a butterfly. He confesses to her one Christmas after she broke up with her boyfriend and they begin their relationship. Saeko has a burning passion for chocolate and gives a box of famous French chocolates to Sōta. Thus he decides to learn how to make smooth and delicious chocolate especially for her. However, the day before Valentine's Day, she refuses his box of home-made chocolates, saying that she has reconciled with her boyfriend and that they are now together once more. Heavy-hearted, Sōta asks Saeko to get rid of his chocolate for him, since it is painful to throw away something he made for someone special, to which she agrees and bids him farewell on a snowy evening. After the loss, Sōta travels to France to be employed by a renowned brand of chocolate and continues chasing his "fairy". Five years later, he returns to Japan, now having made a name for himself as a "Chocolate Prince". He takes over his family business and transforms it into an elegant chocolate shop. Saeko visits him again and he is determined to pursue her for many years to come, irrespective of her superficial marriage to a powerful man and the many opinions from his peers and coworkers about his obsession and whether or not Saeko is just playing around with Sōta.

== Characters ==
Sōta Koyurugi (小動 爽太, Koyurugi Sōta)
Voiced by: Hiro Shimono (drama CD, movie comic)
Live-action actor: Jun Matsumoto
Sōta Koyurugi is the main character in the story. After six years of training in France, Sōta Koyurugi comes back to Japan, and becomes the chef for his own chocolate store Choco La Vie. As he has not stopped loving Saeko, he still wants to get her attention with what he achieved, but Sōta Koyurugi never expected to find that Saeko Takahashi is getting married.
Saeko Takahashi (高橋 紗絵子, Takahashi Saeko)
Voiced by: Erino Hazuki (drama CD), M·A·O (movie comic)
Live-action actor: Satomi Ishihara
Saeko Takahashi is the second main character, and she is the love interest of Sōta Koyurugi. When she was a senior student in the same high school as Sōta Koyurugi, she used to date only the handsome boys. Saeko Takahashi is interested in fashion, makeup, and chocolate. When she meets Sōta Koyurugi again, she breaks his heart by telling him that she is marrying an older man who works for a publishing company. She asks Sōta to make her wedding cake and desserts because she wants to sound out Sōta's love for her. Despite not displaying any romantic love towards him, she seems to continue to encourage Sōta's desire and obsession, taking his unconditional love for granted and remains possessive of him.
Kaoruko Inoue (井上 薫子, Inoue Kaoruko)
Voiced by: Hitomi Nabatame (drama CD), Chika Anzai (movie comic)
Live-action actor: Asami Mizukawa
Kaoruko Inoue is a member of the staff and the manager at the Choco La Vie. She has been working in the store since Sōta Koyurugi's father was selling French pastries and cakes before Sōta changed it into a chocolate store. When Sōta Koyurugi opens the store Choco La Vie, she gives a lot of advice and starts to develop an unrequited love to him.
Erena Kato (加藤 えれな, Katō Erena)
Voiced by: Ami Koshimizu (drama CD), Eriko Matsui (movie comic)
Live-action actor: Kiko Mizuhara
Erena Kato is a fashion model. She meets Sōta Koyurugi at a party and they develop a strong friendship. They both relate to each other as Erena Kato also has an unrequited love.
Olivier Tréluyer (オリヴィエ・トレルイエ, Orivie Toreruie)
Voiced by: Hiroshi Kamiya (drama CD), Yugo Sato (movie comic)
Live-action actor: Junpei Mizobata
Olivier Tréluyer is the son of the owner of Patisserie Tréluyer, a famous long-established store in France. He is Sōta's good friend and is a member of the staff at Choco La Vie.
Matsuri Koyurugi (小動 まつり, Koyurugi Matsuri)
Voiced by: Akeno Watanabe (drama CD), Aina Suzuki (movie comic)
Live-action actor: Kasumi Arimura
Matsuri Koyurugi is Sōta Koyurugi's younger sister, and she is a university student and a part-timer at Choco La Vie. Although she is a modest and cheerful person, she is dating her friend's boyfriend. When Olivier Treluyer tells her about his feelings for her, she gets really surprised.
Seinosuke Rikudo (六道 誠之助, Rikudō Seinosuke)
Voiced by: Junichi Suwabe (drama CD), Ryō Horikawa (movie comic)
Live-action actor: Ryuta Sato
Seinosuke Rikudo owns the store Chocolatier Ricdor, and it is known to be the Chocolate Nobel. He is Sōta Koyurugi's business rival, but at the same time is secretly in love with him.
Makoto Koyurugi (小動 誠, Koyurugi Makoto)
Live-action actor: Naoto Takenaka
Makoto Koyurugi is Sōta Koyurugi's and Matsuri Koyurugi's father, and he is the original owner of his son's store. He used to sell pastries in his store Tokio, but after Sōta returns from France to Japan, he gives him all the support by allowing him to redesign the store Tokio into Choco La Vie.

== Media ==
=== Manga ===
Written and illustrated by Setona Mizushiro, Shitsuren Chocolatier was serialized in Shogakukan's josei manga magazine Rinka starting on February 14, 2008. It transferred to Monthly Flowers in the November 2010 issue (released on September 28, 2010) and completed its serialization in the February 2015 issue (released on December 27, 2014). Shogakukan collected the individual chapters into nine tankōbon volumes published from January 2009 to February 2015. Internationally, Shitsuren Chocolatier is licensed in France by Kazé Manga and in Taiwan by Ever Glory Publishing.

==== List of volumes ====
No.	Japanese release date	Japanese ISBN
1	January 9, 2009	978-4-09-132260-9
2	December 10, 2009	978-4-09-132824-3
3	December 10, 2010	978-4-09-133464-0
4	November 10, 2011	978-4-09-134114-3
5	May 10, 2012	978-4-09-134469-4
6	January 10, 2013	978-4-09-135055-8
7	September 10, 2013	978-4-09-135465-5
8	May 9, 2014	978-4-09-136114-1
9	February 10, 2015	978-4-09-136804-1

=== Live-action ===
In October 2013, Shogakukan was announced that Shitsuren Chocolatier would receive a live-action television series adaptation starring Arashi's Jun Matsumoto as Sōta Koyurugi. The series premiered on Fuji TV on January 13, 2014, running for eleven episodes until March 24, 2014.

==== Episode ratings ====
Episode	Original broadcast date	Ratings (Kanto Region)
01	January 13, 2014	14.4%
02	January 20, 2014	12.7%
03	January 27, 2014	13.3%
04	February 3, 2014	11.8%
05	February 10, 2014	10.5%
06	February 17, 2014	12.0%
07	February 24, 2014	11.7%
08	March 3, 2014	11.4%
09	March 10, 2014	11.2%
10	March 17, 2014	11.4%
11	March 24, 2014	13.7%
Average		12.3%

== Reception ==
Shitsuren Chocolatier won the 36th Kodansha Manga Award in the shōjo category in 2012. It was nominated for the Tezuka Osamu Cultural Prize in 2014.

Volume 5 of the manga sold 44,458 copies by May 13, 2012; volume 6 sold 70,521 copies by January 20, 2013; and volume 7 sold 58,118 copies by September 15, 2013. The manga had 2.7 million copies in print in Japan as of May 2014.
