= X-Day (manga) =

Japanese manga series by Setona Mizushiro

- Cover of the first volume of X-Day as published by Akita Shoten

彼女達のエクス・デイ (Kanojo-tachi no Ekusu-Dei)
- Genre: Drama, romance
- Manga
- Written by: Setona Mizushiro
- Published by: Akita Shoten
- English publisher: NA: Tokyopop; (expired)
- Imprint: Princess Comics
- Magazine: Princess
- Original run: March 6, 2002 – November 6, 2002
- Volumes: 2

X-Day (Japanese: 彼女達のエクス・デイ, Hepburn: Kanojo-tachi no Ekusu-Dei; lit. "Their X-Day" or "The Girls' X-Day") is a Japanese manga series written and illustrated by Setona Mizushiro. It was serialized in Princess magazine from March to November 2002 and published in two tankōbon volumes by Akita Shoten. Written in response to the Columbine High School massacre, the story follows three high school students and a teacher who meet online and plot to blow up their school.

== Plot ==
Rika Saginuma, Nanaka Shimada, Yumihiko Tsukumura, and biology teacher Reiichi Katano meet in a chatroom, where they go by the screennames 11, Polaris, Mr. Money, and Jangalian, respectively. While online, they discuss their frustrations and form a plan to blow up their school, which they see as the source of all their problems. As the characters get to know each other, they begin to realize that their problems are situated in other aspects of life, as well, not just from the school.

The characters find solace in each other; a major topic of the manga is loneliness. All of the characters implode inside as their problems condense. Jangalian is stalked by his boss's daughter, 11 can't deal with a younger girl's presumed superiority, Mr. Money has an abusive mother, and Polaris is crippled by shyness when she is not dressed as a Gothic Lolita. They deal with their problems through helping each other.

== Release ==
X-Day was written and illustrated by Setona Mizushiro in response to the Columbine High School massacre. It was serialized in the monthly shōjo manga magazine Princess, beginning in the April 2002 issue, released on March 6, 2002, and concluding in the December 2002 issue, released on November 6, 2002. Its nine chapters were collected into two tankōbon volumes published by Akita Shoten under the Princess Comics imprint; an unrelated short story, "The Last Supper", was also included in the second volume.

Tokyopop licensed the series for an English-language release in North America, publishing both volumes in 2003; the company closed its North American publishing division in 2011. The series was also licensed in Germany by Tokyopop Germany and in France by Asuka.

No.	Original release date	Original ISBN	English release date	English ISBN
1	October 10, 2002	4-253-19265-3	August 12, 2003	1-59182-379-X
Chapters 1–5
2	January 23, 2003	4-253-19266-1	October 14, 2003	1-59182-380-3
Chapters 6–9; Short story: "The Last Supper" (最後の晩餐, Saigo no Bansan)

== Reception ==
In Manga: The Complete Guide, writer Shaenon K. Garrity praised X-Day for its accurate depiction of "the power and fragility of online connections", noting that the series' "moments of beauty and keen observation ... have earned it a devoted fan base in Japan." However, Garrity felt that the first volume is stronger than the second volume, "in which more predictably shōjo-manga relationship clichés rear their pretty heads."
