= Black Rose Alice =

Japanese manga series by Setona Mizushiro

- Cover of the first Japanese volume as published by Akita Shoten

黒薔薇アリス (Kuro Bara Arisu)
- Genre: Fantasy, romance, supernatural
- Manga
- Written by: Setona Mizushiro
- Published by: Akita Shoten (former); Shogakukan (current)
- English publisher: NA: Viz Media
- Imprint: Princess Comics (former); Flower Comics Alpha (current)
- Magazine: Princess
- Original run: March 6, 2008 – August 6, 2011
- Volumes: 6
- Manga

Black Rose Alice: D.C. al fine
- Written by: Setona Mizushiro
- Published by: Shogakukan
- Imprint: Flower Comics Alpha
- Magazine: Flowers
- Original run: April 28, 2020 – present
- Volumes: 6

Black Rose Alice (Japanese: 黒薔薇アリス, Hepburn: Kuro Bara Arisu) is a Japanese fantasy romance manga series written and illustrated by Setona Mizushiro. It was serialized in Akita Shoten's Princess magazine from 2008 to 2011, after which the manga was put on hold for eight years. Mizushiro resumed serialization under the title Black Rose Alice: D.C. al fine (黒薔薇アリス D.C. al fine, Kuro Bara Arisu D.C. al fine) in Shogakukan's Flowers magazine in April 2020. The original Black Rose Alice manga was published as six tankōbon volumes by Akita Shoten and licensed in English by Viz Media. Centered on Dimitri, a vampire, and his relationship with Azusa, the woman inhabiting the body of his lost love, Black Rose Alice has also been adapted into an audio drama and a stage play in Japan.

== Plot ==
In 1908, Dimitri, a famous singer in Vienna, is killed and turned into a vampire. In 2008, Azuza Kikukawa, a Japanese high school teacher, is hospitalized after a car accident with her boyfriend Kouya. Dimitri approaches Azuza and tells her he will heal Kouya so long as she sacrifices herself to him. She agrees, and her soul is implanted into the body of a young girl, Dimitri's childhood friend and love, Agnieszka. Azuza learns that the various men living in Dimitri's house are vampires, and she must choose one of them as her mate so she can give birth to that vampire's seed. Azuza is renamed Alice, as she accepts her role and grows closer to the men in order to choose.

== Characters ==
Dimitri Lewandowski (ディミトリ・レヴァンドフスキ, Dimitori Revandofusuki)
Voiced by: Yuichi Nakamura (drama CD); portrayed by: Hideo Ishiguro (stage play)
The child of an aristocrat and a Roma woman. Born with a talent for singing, Dimitri was sold to an aristocrat, the father of Theodore, who raised him and sent him to school. He met and fell in love with Agnieszka, who was the fiancé of Theodore, who first saw him as an angel when she heard him sing. He fell in love with her beauty and her innocence. After Agnieszka's sixteenth birthday, he is killed by a horse and later wakes up perfectly fine, but that evening, after a singing performance, everyone who attended mysteriously commits suicide. He is found my Maximilian, who tells him that he is now a vampire and has received the seed of his master, who had a power to control others to sacrifice themselves to him. Maximilian also informs him that vampires will die after they breed, which will then become seeds for future vampires. Dimitri does not believe this at first, but after using his voice to test it, he finds it is true. After a fight with Theodore, where he asks for Agnieszka, he uses his voice to kill Theodore. In a fit of guilt, he attempts to rape Agnieszka in order to end his life (as he will die after); Agnieszka stabs herself to prevent the rape, and Dimitri brings her dying body to Maximilian, who then uses a special rod to keep her alive and tied to Dimitri. Later, Dimitri becomes the head of a small clan of vampires and find the school teacher Azuza, who had been in a car accident. He saves the life of her boyfriend in exchange for her soul. She agrees, and he takes her soul and implants it into the body of Agnieszka, whose soul has long since left her body. He tells her to choose one of the vampires to become her breeding partner. When he and Maximilian come to Japan in 1923, the twelfth year of Taishō, and met the father of Akiko who took them in and later adopted Dimitri as he was dying.
Theodore (テオドール, Teodōru)
Voiced by: Takuma Terashima (drama CD)
The adopted brother of Dimitri, and his closest friend. He saved Dimitri from being raped by Dimitri's singing instructor and forces him to give the leading role to Dimitri, making Dimitri famous. He had been engaged to Agnieszka since they were small children, but does not have feelings for her beyond a sibling-like love. Despite this, he plans to marry her and sleeps with her after her sixteenth birthday party, causing a rift between him and Dimitri, who was in love with her and felt that Theodore had corrupted her purity. Dimitri is further upset by Theodore's continuing affairs and later asks for him to give her to Dimitri. Despite knowing their feelings for each other, he tells Dimitri that their difference in social standings, due to the nature of his birth, would mean that they could never have a future together. This causes Dimitri to use his power to kill Theodore. Dimitri immediately regrets this, remembering his love for Theodore and what he had done for Dimitri, so he decides to end his life by forcefully sleeping with Agnieszka.
Agnieszka von Rosenfelt (アニエスカ・フォン・ローゼンフェルト, Aniesuka fon Rōzenferuto)
Voiced by: Yukana (drama CD); portrayed by: Mari Iriki (stage play)
An aristocrat and the fiancé of Theodore since they were small children. She was beautiful and innocent and falls in love with Dimitri after hearing him sing. On her birthday, she is given a necklace with a hidden knife, which she uses to stab herself when Dimitri tries to rape her. Her soul leaves her body, but her body is later preserved.
Azusa Kikukawa (菊川 梓, Kikukawa Azusa) / Alice (アリス, Arisu)
Voiced by: Yukana (drama CD); portrayed by: Mari Iriki (stage play)
Begins the story as a high school teacher who is dating her student Kouya. Azuza attempts to end her relationship with him because she feels that their age difference will cause him to change his mind about her later. He follows her into a cab as she tries to leave, but they are hit by a semi-truck. She is then visited by Dimitri, who tells her that Kouya is dying but can be saved in exchange for her life. She agrees to anything so long as Kouya is saved. Dimitri saves Kouya with his familiars and takes her soul, implanting it into the body of Agnieszka. They explain to her that she is to pick the best one of them to become her mate in order to breed. As she comes to term with this, and to being in the body of a sixteen-year-old girl, she asks them to rename her in order for her to start her new life. They name her Alice, in reference to the book Alice's Adventures in Wonderland (as her cat's name was Cheshire). She gets close to Leo, and they bond, but she cannot bring herself to choose him. His death greatly affects her, and she becomes hesitant in getting closer to others, despite her growing attraction to Dimitri who keeps her at arm's length. She later runs into Kouya again, who has become depressed after her death. After interacting a few times, he starts to realize that Alice, despite the new body, is Azuza. She sleeps with him, but afterwards feels she has made a mistake; she realizes that while Kouya has not moved on, she has, and that she is no longer the same person. She also begins to develop feelings for Dimitri, becoming upset after reading the diary of Akiko, the daughter of the man who took him in when he first came to Japan.
Kouya Ikushima (生島 光哉, Ikushima Kōya)
Voiced by: Hiro Shimono (drama CD); portrayed by: Yutaka Nozaki (stage play)
The student who was dating Azuza. She sacrifices herself in order for Dimitri to save Kouya. Kouya later becomes depressed when he encounters Azuza as Alice. He eventually recognizes her and hopes to begin their relationship again.
Reiji (玲二)
Portrayed by: Yūsuke Kashiwagi (stage play)
Kai's twin brother. Originally, he did not remember his past, but he eventually begins to remember. He was sickly and was often tended to by his brother and his girlfriend Akane. After Akane was raped by Kai, he shoots her.
Kai (櫂)
Portrayed by: Taishi Sugie (stage play)
Reiji's twin brother. Kai tries to hide his feelings for Alice, pushing for her to choose Reiji, despite his own love for her. When Alice first wakes up, while dreaming about Kouya, she kisses Kai. While Reiji does not remember his past, it is shown that Kai does and feels guilty over their past. Kai was always in love with Reiji's girlfriend Akane. She comes to check on Reiji during a storm, and Kai confesses his feelings and that Reiji is not getting better. When she tries to leave, he forces himself on her. Reiji comes in after and sees her crying, assuming that they had been having an affair. She tells them that she wants to die and Reiji shoots her. As Reiji begins to remember, Kai confesses that Akane had never betrayed him, that it was only Kai.
Leo (レオ, Reo) / Taichirou Kusonose (楠瀬 太一郎, Kusunose Taichirō)
Voiced by: Takashi Kondō (drama CD); portrayed by: Ryutarou Akimoto (stage play)
Becomes the main companion to Alice and the most aggressive in competing for her affection. He received the seed of Maximilian. Prior to his death, he was a model where he received the nickname "Leo". He tries to get closer to Alice and to persuade her to pick him, but in the end, she is unable to decide. He refuses to tell her that he is dying and sleeps with Akari instead, prolonging her life long enough for her to finish her book and leaving a message for Alice and Dimitri.
Maximillian (マクシミリアン, Makushimirian)
Voiced by: Junichi Suwabe (drama CD)
He fell in love with the girl who was found to be his mater's mate. He offered his beloved to his mater and later began the search for their seeds. Finding Dimitri, he swears loyalty, saving the body of Agnieszka and helping Dimitri as they relocated to Japan. As he nears the end of his lifespan, he tries to find a mate that loves Dimitri, as he is worried that the part of him that hates Dimitri (for being the one that took the life of his beloved) will spread into his seeds. He asks Akiko, who was in love with Dimitri, to become his mate. She agrees, telling Maximilian that she also loves him because of his honesty and sincerity.
Akari
An author who is already dying when she meets Leo. He explains that he can prolong her life briefly, but the woman who becomes the mate of a vampire will die once she births the seeds. She accepts since she is already dying and it will allow for her to finish her work. Her death later greatly affects Alice, who also becomes jealous of her receiving sap from Dimitri (bodily fluids that she needs to sustain her life and the seeds, obtained through kissing).

== Media ==
=== Manga ===
Black Rose Alice was launched in the April 2008 issue of Akita Shoten's Princess magazine on March 6, 2008. The first part of the manga concluded in the magazine's September 2011 issue on August 6, 2011, after which author Setona Mizushiro announced she was putting the series on hold. Akita Shoten collected the chapters into six tankōbon volumes published under the Princess Comics imprint from November 2008 to October 2011. Shogakukan re-released the manga in six shinsōban volumes published under the Flower Comics Alpha imprint from August to October 2016. Internationally, Black Rose Alice is licensed in English by Viz Media, in French by Kazé, and in German by Carlsen Comics.

On January 28, 2020, after an eight-year hiatus, Mizushiro announced that the manga would resume serialization in Shogakukan's Flowers magazine under the title Black Rose Alice: D.C. al fine (黒薔薇アリス D.C. al fine, Kuro Bara Arisu D.C. al fine). The series, featuring new central characters and perspectives, was launched in the June 2020 issue of Flowers on April 28, 2020. Shogakukan published Black Rose Alice: D.C. al fine's first tankōbon volume under the Flower Comics Alpha imprint on March 10, 2021. Six volumes have been released as of May 2026.

List of Black Rose Alice volumes
| No. | Original release date | Original ISBN | English release date | English ISBN |
|---|---|---|---|---|
| 1 | November 14, 2008 (Akita Shoten); August 10, 2016 (Shogakukan) | 978-4-253-19191-3 (Akita Shoten); 978-4-09-138638-0 (Shogakukan) | August 5, 2014 | 978-1-4215-7160-7 |
| 2 | May 15, 2009 (Akita Shoten); August 10, 2016 (Shogakukan) | 978-4-253-19192-0 (Akita Shoten); 978-4-09-138639-7 (Shogakukan) | November 4, 2014 | 978-1-4215-7161-4 |
| 3 | December 16, 2009 (Akita Shoten); September 9, 2016 (Shogakukan) | 978-4-253-19193-7 (Akita Shoten); 978-4-09-138648-9 (Shogakukan) | February 3, 2015 | 978-1-4215-7162-1 |
| 4 | September 16, 2010 (Akita Shoten); September 9, 2016 (Shogakukan) | 978-4-253-19194-4 (Akita Shoten); 978-4-09-138649-6 (Shogakukan) | May 5, 2015 | 978-1-4215-7163-8 |
| 5 | January 14, 2011 (Akita Shoten); October 7, 2016 (Shogakukan) | 978-4-253-19195-1 (Akita Shoten); 978-4-09-138678-6 (Shogakukan) | August 4, 2015 | 978-1-4215-7164-5 |
| 6 | October 14, 2011 (Akita Shoten); October 7, 2016 (Shogakukan) | 978-4-253-19196-8 (Akita Shoten); 978-4-09-138679-3 (Shogakukan) | November 3, 2015 | 978-1-4215-7165-2 |

List of Black Rose Alice: D.C. al fine volumes
| No. | Japanese release date | Japanese ISBN |
|---|---|---|
| 1 | March 10, 2021 | 978-4-09-871278-6 |
| 2 | December 10, 2021 | 978-4-09-871496-4 |
| 3 | November 10, 2022 | 978-4-09-871765-1 |
| 4 | November 9, 2023 | 978-4-09-872363-8 |
| 5 | October 9, 2025 | 978-4-09-873067-4 |
| 6 | May 8, 2026 | 978-4-09-8734160 |

=== Other media ===
A drama CD adaptation of the manga's first volume was released in Japan on December 25, 2009.

A stage play adaptation of the manga ran at the Zepp Blue Theater Roppongi in Tokyo from May 12 to May 21, 2017. It starred Hideo Ishiguro as Dimitri and Mari Iriki as Azusa or Alice. A filmed performance was released on DVD in Japan in October 2017.

== Reception ==
Rebecca Silverman of Anime News Network gave Black Rose Alice's first volume an overall grade of A−. The staff at Manga News gave the series a grade of 16.67 out of 20, and three of the staff at Manga Sanctuary gave it a 7.67 out of 10.
