= The Cornered Mouse Dreams of Cheese =

Japanese manga series

- Cover of the Japanese version's first edition, released on January 26, 2006

窮鼠はチーズの夢を見る (Kyūso wa Chīzu no Yume o Miru)
- Genre: Boys' love (Note: The Cornered Mouse Dreams of Cheese is a josei manga series, but has since been considered boys' love by industry professionals and marketing.)
- Manga
- Written by: Setona Mizushiro
- Published by: Shogakukan
- English publisher: NA: Seven Seas Entertainment
- Imprint: Judy Comics; Flower Comics Alpha (re-release)
- Magazine: Nightly Judy
- Original run: 2004 – 2006
- Volumes: 1
- Manga

The Carp on the Chopping Block Jumps Twice 俎上の鯉は二度跳ねる
- Written by: Setona Mizushiro
- Published by: Shogakukan
- English publisher: NA: Seven Seas Entertainment
- Imprint: Flower Comics Alpha
- Magazine: Judy (2006); Mobile Flower (2007–2009)
- Original run: 2006 – 2009
- Volumes: 1
- Live-action film
- Directed by: Isao Yukisada
- Written by: Anne Horiizumi
- Music by: Yoshihiro Hanno
- Studio: Phantom Film
- Released: September 11, 2020

The Cornered Mouse Dreams of Cheese (Japanese: 窮鼠はチーズの夢を見る, Hepburn: Kyūso wa Chīzu no Yume o Miru) is a Japanese manga series written and illustrated by Setona Mizushiro. The Cornered Mouse Dreams of Cheese was serialized in the josei manga magazine Judy from 2005 to 2006. The book was followed up with a one-volume sequel titled The Carp on the Chopping Block Jumps Twice (俎上の鯉は二度跳ねる, Sōjo no Koi wa Nido Haneru).

A live-action film adapting both The Cornered Mouse Dreams of Cheese and The Carp on the Chopping Block Jumps Twice was released on September 11, 2020.

== Plot ==
=== The Cornered Mouse Dreams of Cheese ===
Kyouichi Ootomo, an indecisive and passive office worker, runs into his college underclassmen, Wataru Imagase. Imagase reveals that he was hired by Kyouichi's wife, Chikako, to investigate his infidelity, but he also confesses that he is gay and has been in love with Kyouichi for a long time. He promises not to reveal anything in exchange for a kiss. Kyouichi agrees to the tryst, hoping it will save his marriage, but their secret relationship begins to escalate and eventually becomes sexual. Eventually, Chikako reveals to Kyouichi that she planned on divorcing him and only hired Imagase to get a higher settlement. Kyouichi also learns that Imagase had kept his promise not to reveal his cheating on her.

Shortly after Kyouichi and Chikako separate, Imagase breaks up with his boyfriend and begins living in Kyouichi's apartment. As the two grow closer, Kyouichi begins spending less time with women and realizes he is becoming attracted to Imagase. At his university reunion party, Kyouichi reconnects with his ex-girlfriend, Natsuki, who becomes interested in renewing their relationship. While Kyouichi remains unsure as to whether he wants a life with Imagase or return to dating women, Natsuki, however, discovers his relationship with Imagase when she takes him home after a night of drinking. To settle their confrontation, Imagase and Natsuki force him to choose. Kyouichi picks Natsuki, believing he could never be in a relationship with a man. After the two sleep together, both Kyouichi and Natsuki realize that Kyouichi's feelings for Imagase remain strong and they break up. Two months later, Kyouichi finds Imagase in town and the two reconcile.

=== The Carp on the Chopping Block Jumps Twice ===
Kyouichi is promoted to section manager at his job, and he learns that his assistant, Tamaki Okamura, is interested in him. He later learns that Tamaki is the daughter of his superior, Yanagida, and is offered to be set up in a relationship with her. As Kyouichi and Tamaki become more deeply acquainted, especially after Yanagida's death, Imagase becomes increasingly insecure and decides to end the relationship himself. After Imagase moves out of Kyouichi's apartment, Kyouichi and Tamaki begin dating.

Later, while on an assignment, Imagase spots Tamaki going to a gynecologist and notices that she is being stalked by his target, but he is too late in stopping him, resulting in Tamaki falling down a flight of stairs. At the hospital, Kyouichi reunites with Imagase, and Imagase begs him to let him be in his life, to which he rejects. Before Imagase leaves, Kyouichi confesses about his frustrations with him and admits their relationship has been dysfunctional. The two make up, and Kyouichi ends his relationship with Tamaki, to which he is met with scorn from their co-worker. After he turns to Imagase, the two decide to live together again, uncertain about what their future may bring.

== Characters ==
Kyouichi Ootomo (大伴恭一, Ōtomo Kyōichi)
Voiced by: Yuichi Nakamura (drama CD); portrayed by: Tadayoshi Okura (film)
Kyouichi is an indecisive office worker who is 29 years old.
Wataru Imagase (今ヶ瀬渉, Imagase Wataru)
Voiced by: Koji Yusa (drama CD); portrayed by: Ryo Narita (film)
Imagase is a 27-year-old private investigator who attended the same college as Kyouichi. He has been in love with him for years, and, when assigned to investigate him, takes the opportunity to act out on his feelings.
Chikako Ootomo (大伴知佳子, Ōtomo Chikako)
Voiced by: Hitomi Nabatame (drama CD); portrayed by: Miyu Sakihi (film)
Chikako is Kyouichi's wife who has long been dissatisfied with their marriage and uses Kyouichi's earnings to buy new things. After years of a troubled marriage, she leaves him and initially hires Imagase to investigate Kyouichi's infidelity to secure a higher settlement from their divorce.
Natsuki (夏生, Natsuki)
Voiced by: Rei Igarashi (drama CD); portrayed by: Honami Satō (film)
Natsuki is Kyouichi's ex-girlfriend from college.
Tamaki Okamura (岡村たまき, Okamura Tamaki)
Voiced by: Chiwa Saito (drama CD); portrayed by: Shiori Yoshida (film)
Tamaki is a kind-hearted office worker and the daughter of Kyouichi's boss, who falls in love with Kyouichi.

== Media ==
=== Manga ===
The Cornered Mouse Dreams of Cheese is written and illustrated by Setona Mizushiro. It was serialized in the manga magazine Judy from 2005 to 2006. The chapters were later released in one bound volume by Shogakukan under the Judy Comics imprint.

The series was followed up with a one-volume sequel titled The Carp on the Chopping Block Jumps Twice (俎上の鯉は二度跳ねる, Sōjo no Koi wa Nido Haneru), which was published in Judy in 2006 and was later transferred to Mobile Flowers after Judy became defunct. To coincide with the bound volume release of The Carp on the Chopping Block Jumps Twice, The Cornered Mouse Dreams of Cheese was re-released on May 8, 2009, with a new illustrated cover and under the Flower Comics Alpha imprint after the Judy Comics imprint became defunct. A drama CD adaptation was released on February 27, 2008.

Reprintings of The Cornered Mouse Dreams of Cheese and The Carp on the Chopping Block Jumps Twice removed explicit sexual content beginning January 28, 2020 in order to appeal to a younger demographic with the release of the 2020 live-action film adaptation. The cover of the volumes will remain the same, making them indistinguishable from previous printings. Edited versions of the first and bonus chapters of The Cornered Mouse Dreams of Cheese, "Kissing Gourami" and "Hummingbird Rhapsody", were reprinted in the March 2020 issue of Flowers. An omnibus volume of the edited versions was released on April 10, 2020.

In January 2019, Seven Seas Entertainment announced that they were distributing both books in English.

No.	Title	Original release date	English release date
1	The Cornered Mouse Dreams of Cheese; Kyūso wa Chīzu no Yume o Miru (窮鼠はチーズの夢を見る)	January 26, 2006 (original release); May 8, 2009 (re-release); 4-7780-1001-9 (original release); ISBN 978-4-09-132514-3 (re-release)	November 5, 2019; 978-1-64-275759-0
2	The Carp on the Chopping Block Jumps Twice; Sōjo no Koi wa Nido Haneru (俎上の鯉は二度跳ねる)	May 9, 2009; 978-4-09-132515-0	February 11, 2020; 978-1-64-275760-6
Omnibus	The Cornered Mouse Dreams of Cheese; Kyūso wa Chīzu no Yume o Miru (窮鼠はチーズの夢を見る)	April 10, 2020	—

=== Film ===
In February 2019, a live-action film adaptation for The Cornered Mouse Dreams of Cheese, also covering the story for The Carp on the Chopping Block Jumps Twice, was announced and slated for a release on June 5, 2020, but was postponed to September 11, 2020, due to the COVID-19 pandemic. The film is directed by Isao Yukisada with screenplay by Anne Horiizumi. It stars Tadayoshi Okura as Kyouichi and Ryo Narita as Imagase.

== Reception ==
Keiko Takemiya praised the series for being an "amazing boys' love [story]", particularly in The Carp on the Chopping Block Jumps Twice. Shigeko Matsuo from Asahi Shimbun also praised it for exploring Kyouichi's inner conflict on love through shoulder angel and devil versions of himself, White Kyouichi and Black Kyouichi. The Carp on the Chopping Block Jumps Twice also received many 5-star reviews on Amazon Japan upon release. Rebecca Silverman of Anime News Network noted that there was a "harshness" and "anger" in the explicit scenes that were "interesting", and that there was an "overall turbulent tone" that keeps the story "uncomfortable." Upon revisiting the manga, columnists at both Anime News Network and The Japan Times criticized its use outdated tropes, particularly in regards to how Kyouichi and Imagase's relationship was founded on blackmail, as well as views on homosexuality and bisexuality.

The live-action film adaptation debuted at #5 on its opening week. James Hadfield gave the film 2 out of 5 stars, praising Anne Horiizumi's script for removing the homophobic slurs found in the original manga; however, he criticized the film for removing some of the characters' internal dialogue, making the characters' intentions hard to understand as a result, as well as the new "ambivalent" ending created specifically for the film. James Marsh from the South China Morning Post gave the film 1 out of 5 stars, citing the performances as "awkward actors going through the motions" and that neither Kyouichi nor Imagase were "remotely sympathetic." Ryo Narita won the Best Male Supporting Actor at the 62nd Blue Ribbon Awards for his portrayal of Imagase in 2020. He was also nominated at the 75th Mainichi Film Awards and the 44th Japan Academy Film Prize.
