= Hikaru Monotachi =

Single by Mayu Watanabe
- B-side: "Chihēsen no Kanata wa Doko ni Aru? -Beyond the Horizon-"(Type-A); "Heart no Soup" (Type-B); "Futari no Yoake" (Type-C); "Koi o Funjyatta" (Limited Edition, Regular Edition); "Sayonara no Hashi"
- Released: November 21, 2012
- Label: Sony Music Records
- Lyricist: Yasushi Akimoto
- Producer: Yasushi Akimoto

Mayu Watanabe singles chronology
| "Otona Jellybeans" (2012) | "Hikaru Monotachi" (2012) | "Rappa Renshūchū" (2013) |

Music video
- Mayu Watanabe "Hikaru Monotachi"; Mayu Watanabe "Sayonara no Hashi" - YouTube

Professional ratings
Review scores
| Source | Rating |
|---|---|
| Billboard Japan | Favorable |

"Hikaru Monotachi" (ヒカルものたち; "The Shining Ones") is a single by Mayu Watanabe. It reached number one in the Oricon Weekly Chart. Watanabe is the fourth AKB48 member with a number-one solo single after Atsuko Maeda, Tomomi Itano, and Rino Sashihara.

== Background ==
The single was released in five versions: Limited Edition A, Limited Edition B, Limited Edition C, Regular Edition, and Complete Production Edition. This single's theme was a Vocaloid/Anime theme, which reflects Watanabe's personality and hobbies.

== Charts ==
| Chart | Peak position |
|---|---|
| JPN Oricon | 1 |
| Japan Hot 100 | 3 |
| TWN Five Music J/K-pop Chart | 4 |
