= Unmet: A Neurosurgeon's Diary =

Japanese manga series

- First tankōbon volume cover

アンメット ーある脳外科医の日記ー (Anmetto: Aru Nōgekai no Nikki)
- Genre: Medical drama
- Manga
- Written by: Yuzuru Kojika
- Illustrated by: Kanto Ōtsuki
- Published by: Kodansha
- Imprint: Morning KC
- Magazine: Morning
- Original run: December 10, 2020 – July 18, 2024
- Volumes: 17
- Television drama
- Music by: fox capture plan
- Studio: Kansai TV
- Original network: FNS (Kansai TV, Fuji TV)
- Original run: April 15, 2024 – present
- Episodes: 11
- icon

Unmet: A Neurosurgeon's Diary (Japanese: アンメット ーある脳外科医の日記ー, Hepburn: Anmetto: Aru Nōgekai no Nikki) is a Japanese manga series written by Yuzuru Kojika and illustrated by Kanto Ōtsuki. It was serialized in Kodansha's Morning magazine from December 2020 to July 2024. A live-action television drama adaptation aired from April to June 2024. A second season is set to premiere in January 2027.

== Synopsis ==
A neurosurgeon suffers a brain injury in an accident and develops progressive amnesia, meaning she is no longer able to form new memories. She now works as a nurse until a strange doctor helps her uncover the secrets of her past and regain her surgical skills.

== Media ==
=== Manga ===
Written by Yuzuru Kojika and illustrated by Kanto Ōtsuki, Unmet: A Neurosurgeon's Diary was serialized in Kodansha's Morning magazine from December 10, 2020, to July 18, 2024. Its chapters were collected into seventeen tankōbon volumes from March 23, 2021, to October 22, 2024.

No.	Release date	ISBN
1	March 23, 2021	978-4-06-522769-5
2	June 23, 2021	978-4-06-523451-8
3	September 22, 2021	978-4-06-524545-3
4	December 23, 2021	978-4-06-526128-6
5	March 23, 2022	978-4-06-526997-8
6	June 22, 2022	978-4-06-528052-2
7	September 22, 2022	978-4-06-529261-7
8	January 23, 2023	978-4-06-530010-7
9	February 21, 2023	978-4-06-530847-9
10	April 21, 2023	978-4-06-531167-7
11	May 23, 2023	978-4-06-531505-7
12	August 23, 2023	978-4-06-532669-5
13	November 22, 2023	978-4-06-533367-9
14	April 23, 2024	978-4-06-535222-9
15	May 22, 2024	978-4-06-535223-6
16	August 22, 2024	978-4-06-536382-9
17	October 22, 2024	978-4-06-537311-8

=== Drama ===
A live-action television drama adaptation was announced in February 2024. The drama starred Hana Sugisaki and Ryuya Wakaba in lead roles and aired on Kansai TV and Fuji TV from April 15 to June 24, 2024. A second season was announced to have been green-lit on November 4, 2026. It will premiere in January 2027.
