= Saba Doru =

- Genre: Teen drama, Slice of Life, Comedy
- Created by: Yasushi Akimoto
- Directed by: Dai Satō; Keisuke Toyoshima; Kei Hirota; Tomohide Sano
- Starring: Mayu Watanabe; Tamae Ando; Tadashi Sakata; Keisuke Kaminaga; Hitomi Takahashi; Ryuya Wakaba; Yasushi Akimoto
- Country of origin: Japan
- Original language: Japanese
- No. of seasons: 1
- No. of episodes: 12

Original release
- Network: TV Tokyo
- Release: January 13 – April 6, 2012

Saba Doru (さばドル) (lit. "Saba Doll") is a Japanese television drama series broadcast on TV Tokyo starring AKB48's Mayu Watanabe. The story revolves around the 38-year-old Usa Shijimi (Watanabe), who is a high school classical literature teacher. Her students are mean to her, but they do not realize that she has another identity. Outside of school, she lies about her age to be active as the super popular 17-year-old idol Watanabe Mayu, whom the students adore. The show aired on TV Tokyo on Fridays starting from January 13, 2012, to April 6, 2012, with 12 episodes. After the show ended the series was turned into a manga drawn by Akihiro Nakamura and published in Kodansha's Weekly Young Magazine over three volumes in 2012.

== Notes ==
The title is a combination of the Japanese expression sabayomi (鯖読み), which refers to lying about age, and "idol" (アイドル, aidoru).
