= Rappa Renshūchū =

Single by Mayu Watanabe
- Released: July 10, 2013 (Japan)
- Genre: J-pop
- Label: Sony Music Japan
- Songwriter: Yasushi Akimoto (lyrics)
- Producer: Yasushi Akimoto

Mayu Watanabe singles chronology
"Hikaru Monotachi" (2012)	"Rappa Renshūchū" (2013)	"Deai no Tsuzuki" (2015)

Music video
- Mayu Watanabe "Rappa Renshuchu" on YouTube

"Rappa Renshūchū" (ラッパ練習中) is the 4th single by Mayu Watanabe, released in Japan on July 10, 2013.

== Release ==
The single was released in five versions: Complete Limited Edition, Time Period Limited Edition, Limited Edition A, Limited Edition B, and Regular Edition. An illustration contest was held on the website pixiv for the Complete Limited Edition. It features the "Rogoku Yuenchi kara Mayuyu wo Sukue!!! in Tokyo Dome City Attractions". The other editions were done in collaboration with Oreskaband and was directed by Fantasista Utamaro.

== Track listing ==
=== Regular Edition ===
CD
No.	Title	Length
1.	"Rappa Renshūchū" (ラッパ練習中)
2.	"Seifuku Identity" (制服アイデンティティー)
3.	"Taiyō to Sanpo" (太陽と散歩)
4.	"Rappa Renshūchū (Instrumental)" (ラッパ練習中（Instrumental）)
5.	"Seifuku Identity" (制服アイデンティティー（Instrumental）)
6.	"Taiyō to Sanpo (Instrumental)" (太陽と散歩（Instrumental）)

== Bonus (all editions) ==
- Mayuyu Mystery-solving Game Card (10 types in total, one included at randon)
- Entry ticket for a premium lottery

== Charts ==
Chart (2013)	Peak position
Oricon Weekly Singles Chart	3
Billboard Japan Hot 100	5
