= Itsuroh Shimoda =

Japanese musician

Itsuro Shimoda (Japanese:下田逸郎 (Shimoda Itsurō), born May 12, 1948 (age 78) Miyazaki, Japan) is a Japanese musician, singer, and composer.

== Career ==
Shimoda’s style is characterized as folk pop, mixed with traditional Japanese styles. He was a member of the groups Shimonsai and Tokyo Kid Brothers. One of his biggest hits is "Everybody Anyone", released with the album Love Songs and Lamentations in 1973. Shimoda later composed the score for the 2019 film It Feels So Good.
