= Ryuya Wakaba =

Japanese actor (born 1989)

Ryūya Wakaba
- 若葉 竜也
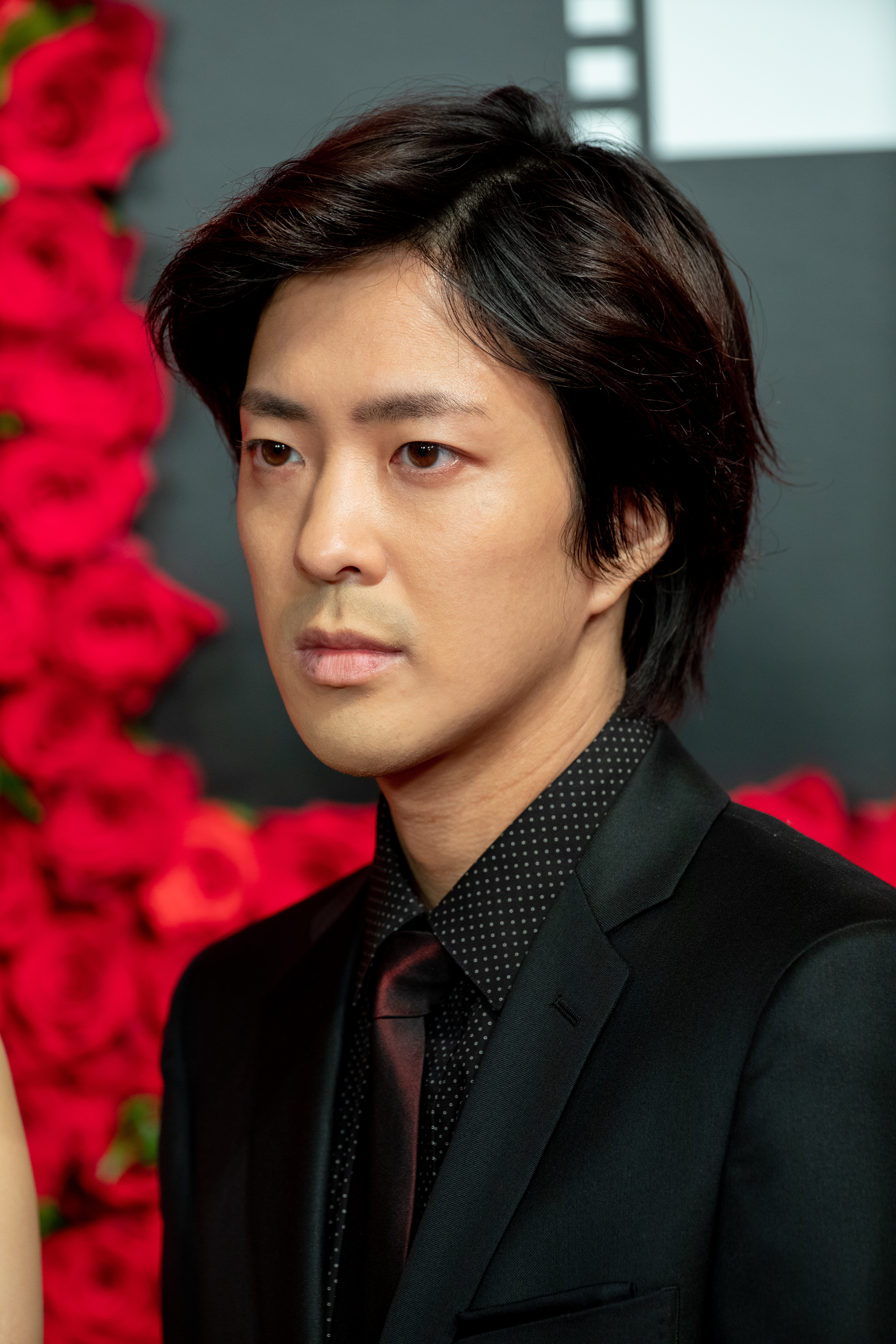
- Wakaba in 2018
- Born: June 10, 1989 (age 37); Nerima, Tokyo, Japan
- Occupation: Actor
- Years active: 1998–present
- Website: ryuya.net

Ryūya Wakaba (若葉 竜也, Wakaba Ryūya; born June 10, 1989) is a Japanese actor assigned to First Place talent agency. He and his four brothers formed the Wakaba Brothers.

== Filmography ==
=== Television ===
Year	Title	Role	Notes	Ref.
1998	Tokugawa Yoshinobu	Shichirōmaro	Taiga drama	
2003	Kikujiro to Saki	Masaru Kitano		
2004	4TEEN	Jun		
2005	Koisuru Nichiyobi	Nao		
2005	Nobuta wo Produce	Shittaka		
2006	Toritsu Mizusho!	Sanshirō Suzaki	TV movie	
2006	My Boss My Hero	Rikuo Hoshino		
2006	Switch wo Osutoki	Kimiaki Kogure		
2006	Love of My Life	A worker	Episode 10	
2007	Ballad of a Shinigami	Mitsuki Asano		
2007	Seito Shokun!	Naoki Shirai		
2007	Kaijoken Musashi	Shin'ichi Morioka		
2007	Detective School Q	Hibiki Sakuma	Episodes 4, 5	
2008	Sensei wa Erai!	Jun Saeki		
2008	Gokusen 3	Ryuya Yoshida		
2008–09	Threads of Destiny	Shu Yasuda		
2009	The Policeman's Lineage	Midori	Mini-series	
2009	Samurai High School	Reiji Kuroda	Episodes 1, 2	
2010	Zettai Reido	Takuma Hirota	Episode 10	
2011	The After-Dinner Mysteries	Yūsuke Sawamura	Episode 4	
2012	Saba Doru	Yūji Nashimoto		
2016	The Brave Yoshihiko and The Seven Driven People	Kiji	Episode 8	
2020	A Day-Off of Kasumi Arimura	Tanaka	Episode 2	
2020	Ochoyan	Shinji Kogure	Asadora	
2022	One Night, She Thinks of the Dawn			
2023	A Day-Off of Hana Sugisaki		Episode 2	
2024–27	Unmet: A Neurosurgeon's Diary	Tomoharu Sanpei	2 seasons	

=== Film ===
Year	Title	Role	Notes	Ref.
2005	Hinokio			
2008	Threads of Destiny	Shu Yasuda		
2009	Gokusen: The Movie	Ryuya Yoshida		
2011	Gantz	Takahashi		
2011	Gantz: Perfect Answer	Takahashi		
2011	Genji Monogatari: Sennen no Nazo	Fujiwara no Koremitsu		
2011	Dog×Police	Tōru Kusaka		
2015	Akegarasu	Norio		
2016	The Katsuragi Murder Case	Minoru Katsuragi		
2017	Pumpkin and Mayonnaise	Terao		
2017	A Beautiful Star	Kaoru Takemiya		
2018	Punk Samurai Slash Down	Osamu		
2018	Just Only Love	Nakahara		
2019	The Stormy Family	Toshio Satō		
2020	All the Things We Never Said	Takeda		
2020	True Mothers	Yakuza		
2020	The Voice of Sin			
2020	Awake	Riku		
2021	Over the Town	Ao Arakawa	Lead role	
2021	In Those Days	Nishino		
2021	Remain in Twilight	Akashi		
2022	Prior Convictions	Minoru		
2022	God Seeks in Return	Umekawa		
2022	It's All My Fault	Shigeyuki Yamazaki		
2022	By the Window			
2023	Call Me Chihiro	Taniguchi		
2023	Masked Hearts	Yūji		
2023	Ichiko	Yoshinori Hasegawa		
2024	Penalty Loop	Jun Iwamori	Lead role	
2024	My Sunshine	Igarashi		
2025	Welcome to the Village			
2025	Strangers in Kyoto	Nakamura		
2025	Climbing for Life	Shintaro Tabe		
2026	Street Kingdom	Momo	Lead role	
2026	Dot to Dot: Will I Be Single Forever?	Shiba		

== Awards and nominations ==
Year	Award	Category	Work(s)	Result	Ref.
2022	47th Hochi Film Awards	Best Supporting Actor	Prior Convictions, By the Window and others	Nominated	
2024	17th Tokyo Drama Awards	Best Supporting Actor	Unmet: A Neurosurgeon's Diary	Won	
2025	49th Elan d'or Awards	Newcomer of the Year	Himself	Won	
