= Deai no Tsuzuki =

- Deai no Tsuzuki Type A Cover

Single by Mayu Watanabe
- Released: June 10, 2015 (Japan)
- Genre: J-pop
- Label: Sony Music Japan
- Songwriter(s): Yasushi Akimoto (lyrics)
- Producer(s): Yasushi Akimoto

Mayu Watanabe singles chronology
"Rappa Renshūchū" (2013)	"Deai no Tsuzuki" (2015)

Music video
- Mayu Watanabe "Deai no Tsuzuki" - YouTube

"Deai no Tsuzuki" (出逢いの続き) is the 5th single by Mayu Watanabe, released in Japan on June 10, 2015.

== Release ==
The single was released in four versions: Complete Limited Edition, Limited Edition A, Limited Edition B, and Regular Edition. The title track was used as the theme song for the drama "Tatakau! Shoten Girl", which featured Watanabe as one of the leads. The coupling song "Onna no Ko Nara" was used as the CM song for Avail.

The title track shows a different side of Watanabe. It is said to be a mature love song, unlike her previous singles.

She will hold 5 events to commemorate the release:

- A mini live & passing of a different version of the cover jacket to fans on June 11, 2015 and June 12, 2015
- A solo live on September 19, 2015
- An event titled "Dokkidoki Otanoshimi Kai" on September 20, 2015
- A cruising live on September 21, 2015

Included in the Complete Limited Version is a fashion book consisting of over 50 fashion styles.

== Track listing ==
=== Limited Edition A ===
CD
No.	Title	Length
1.	"Deai no Tsuzuki" (出逢いの続き)
2.	"Onna no Ko Nara" (女の子なら)
3.	"Yokogao Romance" ((横顔ロマンス)
4.	"Deai no Tsuzuki (Instrumental)" (出逢いの続き（Instrumental）)
5.	"Onna no Ko Nara" (女の子なら（Instrumental）)
6.	"Yokogao Romance (Instrumental)" (横顔ロマンス（Instrumental）)

DVD
No.	Title	Length
1.	"Deai no Tsuzuki (Music Video)"
2.	"Deai no Tsuzuki Music Video - Making"

=== Limited Edition B ===
CD
No.	Title	Length
1.	"Deai no Tsuzuki" (出逢いの続き)
2.	"Onna no Ko Nara" (女の子なら)
3.	"Magirashiteiru" ((紛らしている)
4.	"Deai no Tsuzuki (Instrumental)" (出逢いの続き（Instrumental）)
5.	"Onna no Ko Nara" (女の子なら（Instrumental）)
6.	"Magirashiteiru (Instrumental)" (紛らしている（Instrumental）)

DVD
No.	Title	Length
1.	"Deai no Tsuzuki (Music Video)"
2.	"Deai no Tsuzuki (Music Video) (Drama "Tatakau! Shoten Girl" Special Version)"

=== Regular Edition ===
CD
No.	Title	Length
1.	"Deai no Tsuzuki" (出逢いの続き)
2.	"Onna no Ko Nara" (女の子なら)
3.	"Yuugure to Hoshizora no Aida" ((夕暮れと星空の間)
4.	"Deai no Tsuzuki (Instrumental)" (出逢いの続き（Instrumental）)
5.	"Onna no Ko Nara" (女の子なら（Instrumental）)
6.	"Yuugure to Hoshizora no Aida (Instrumental)" (夕暮れと星空の間（Instrumental）)

=== Complete Limited Edition ===
CD
No.	Title	Length
1.	"Deai no Tsuzuki" (出逢いの続き)
2.	"Onna no Ko Nara" (女の子なら)
3.	"Yuugure to Hoshizora no Aida" ((夕暮れと星空の間)
4.	"Deai no Tsuzuki (Instrumental)" (出逢いの続き（Instrumental）)
5.	"Onna no Ko Nara" (女の子なら（Instrumental）)
6.	"Yuugure to Hoshizora no Aida (Instrumental)" (夕暮れと星空の間（Instrumental）)

DVD
No.	Title	Length
1.	"Onna no Ko Nara (Music Video) (Avail Special Version)"

== Bonuses ==
Type A, Type B, Complete Limited Edition & First-Press Regular Edition

- Premium Lottery Application Ticket
- Avail Card (1 random card out of 8 "Oshare Mayuyu" cards)

== Charts ==
Chart (2015)	Peak position
Oricon Weekly Singles Chart	2
Billboard Japan Hot 100	3
