= Nōnai Poison Berry =

Japanese manga series and its adaptations

脳内ポイズンベリー (Nōnai Poizun Berī)
- Genre: Romance, slice-of-life
- Manga
- Written by: Setona Mizushiro
- Published by: Shueisha
- Imprint: Queen's Comics
- Magazine: Chorus/Cocohana
- Original run: December 28, 2009 – March 28, 2015
- Volumes: 5
- Live-action film

Poison Berry in My Brain
- Directed by: Yūichi Satō
- Written by: Tomoko Aizawa
- Music by: Akio Izutsu
- Released: May 9, 2015
- Runtime: 121 minutes
- Stage play
- Title: Poison Berry in My Brain; Directed by: Yūichi Satō; Written by: Yūka Arai, Takayuki Imanara; Venue: New National Theatre, Tokyo; Location: Shibuya, Tokyo, Japan; Date: March 14 – 29, 2020
- Stage play
- Title: Poison Berry in My Brain; Directed by: Yūichi Satō; Written by: Yūka Arai, Takayuki Imanara; Venue: Meiji-za, COOL JAPAN PARK OSAKA; Location: Chūō, Tokyo, Japan Chūō-ku, Osaka, Japan; Date: August 26 - September 6th, 2022 (Tokyo) September 10–12, 2022（Osaka）

Nōnai Poison Berry (Japanese: 脳内ポイズンベリー, Hepburn: Nōnai Poizun Berii; transl. Poison Berry in My Brain) is a Japanese slice-of-life romance manga series written and illustrated by Setona Mizushiro. It was serialized in Chorus magazine, later relaunched as Cocohana magazine, from December 2009 to March 2015 and collected as five tankōbon volumes by publisher Shueisha. The series was adapted into a live-action film that premiered in Japan in May 2015, as well as a stage play that ran at the New National Theatre, Tokyo, in March 2020, both directed by Yūichi Satō and officially titled Poison Berry in My Brain in English. The Stage play was rerun in 2022 with a different cast.

== Plot ==
Ichiko Sakurai is a 30-year-old woman whose thoughts appear as a council of five individuals: Ishibashi, representing her positive emotions; Ikeda, representing her negative emotions; Hatoko, representing her impulses; Kishi, representing her memories; and Yoshida, representing her reasoning. When Ichiko falls in love with 20-year-old Ryōichi Saotome at a drinking party and sleeps with him, her inner thoughts become chaotic as she navigates through her first love and misunderstandings with Saotome.

== Characters ==
Ichiko Sakurai (櫻井 いちこ, Sakurai Ichiko)
Portrayed by: Yōko Maki (film), Misako Renbutsu (1st stage play), Yuika Motokariya (2nd stage play)
The series' main character, a shy 30-year-old woman whose inner thoughts appear to readers as a board of five very different individuals. When she falls for a younger man at a drinking party, the board members fall into a panic.
Ryōichi Saotome (早乙女 亮一, Saotome Ryōichi)
Portrayed by: Yuki Furukawa (film), Aoto Watanabe (1st stage play), Shunya Shiraishi (2nd stage play)
Ichiko's love interest.
Ochi (越智)
Portrayed by: Sonha (film), Shunya Shiraishi (1st stage play), Ryo Hirano (2nd stage play)
A publishing company editor who shows interest in Ichiko.
Yoshida (吉田)
Portrayed by: Hidetoshi Nishijima (film), Hayato Ichihara (1st stage play), Yusei Yagi (2nd stage play)
The leader of Ichiko's board members. He is generally the member who initiates group votes on Ichiko's next actions.
Ishibashi (石橋)
Portrayed by: Ryunosuke Kamiki (film), Katsuki Motodaka (1st stage play), Hiroki Ino (2nd stage play)
An optimistic board member with a hopeful outlook for Ichiko's future.
Ikeda (池田)
Portrayed by: Yō Yoshida (film), Seina Sagiri (1st stage play), Hanayo Kimura (2nd stage play)
A negative board member who believes that most of Ichiko's actions will end badly.
Hatoko (ハトコ)
Portrayed by: Hiyori Sakurada (film), Yūri Saitō (1st stage play), Yuna Hayakawa (2nd stage play)
A Gothic Lolita board member who thinks and votes on impulse, rather than weighing the pros and cons.
Kishi (岸)
Portrayed by: Kazuyuki Asano (film), Kim Kwangsu (1st stage play), Ken Ishiguro (2nd stage play)
An elderly board member caught up in the past.

== Volumes ==
No.	Japanese release date	Japanese ISBN
1	May 19, 2011	978-4-08-865626-7
2	July 25, 2012	978-4-08-865658-8
3	August 23, 2013	978-4-08-865666-3
4	September 25, 2014	978-4-08-865670-0
5	April 24, 2015	978-4-08-865672-4

== Reception ==
Nōnai Poison Berry ranked 20th in the 2013 Kono Manga ga Sugoi! Top 20 Manga for Female Readers survey. It was also a Jury Selection in the Manga Division at the 17th Japan Media Arts Festival Awards.
