= Ryo Narita =

Japanese model and actor (born 1993)

- 成田 凌
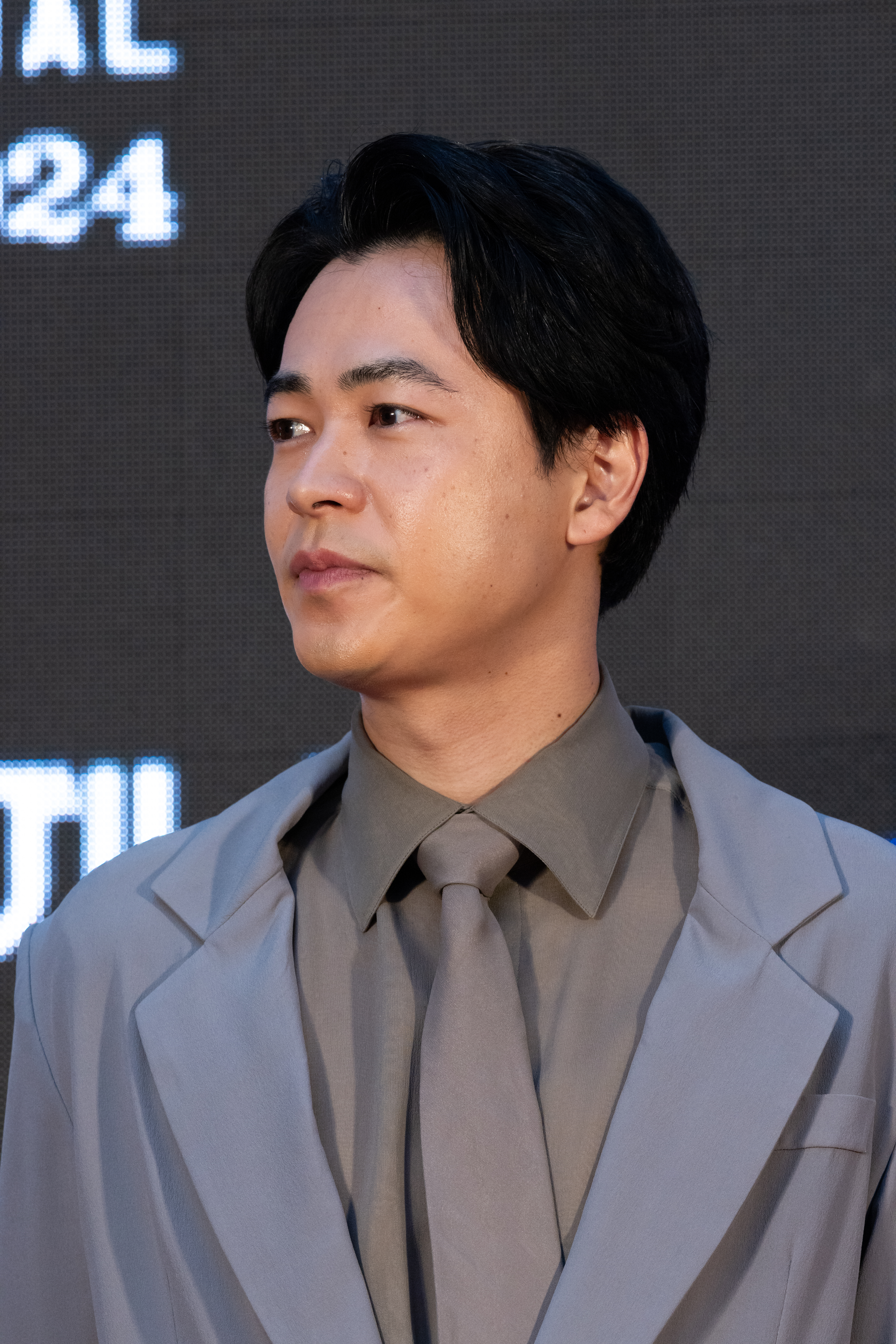
- Narita in 2024
- Born: 22 November 1993 (age 32); Saitama Prefecture, Japan
- Occupations: Actor; model
- Years active: 2013–present
- Agent: Sony Music Artists
- Height: 1.82 m (6 ft 0 in)
- Spouse: Unknown (m. 2024)
- Website: Agency profile

Ryo Narita (成田 凌, Narita Ryō; born 22 November 1993) is a Japanese actor and model. He is represented by Sony Music Artists. Narita started his career as a model for the magazine Men's Non-no. He made his acting debut in the film Flashback.

== Personal life ==
On 29 December 2024, Narita announced his marriage to a non-celebrity woman.

== Filmography ==
=== Film ===
Year	Title	Role	Notes	Ref.
2015	Tobenai Kotori to Merry-go-round	Eba Shimazaki		
2016	The Inerasable	Yamamoto		
2016	Your Name	Katsuhiko Teshigawara (voice)		
2016	L	Baker		
2016	One Piece Film: Gold	Curve (voice)		
2017	Kiseki: Sobito of That Day	92		
2017	Shinjuku Swan II	Hiroshi		
2018	Smokin' on the Moon	Rakuto Hoshino		
2018	Love × Doc	Sakuragi		
2018	Code Blue: The Movie	Shunpei Haitani		
2018	It's Boring Here, Pick Me Up	Shiina		
2018	Stolen Identity	Urano		
2018	The Antique	Inagaki		
2018	Just Only Love	Mamoru		
2019	Chiwawa	Yoshida		
2019	Fly Me to the Saitama	Igarashi	Cameo	
2019	Farewell Song	Shima		
2019	No Longer Human	Jun'ichi Sakura		
2019	Weathering with You	Katsuhiko Teshigawara (voice)		
2019	Talking the Pictures	Shuntarō Someya	Lead role	
2020	The Cornered Mouse Dreams of Cheese	Wataru Imagase	Lead role	
2020	Stolen Identity 2	Urano		
2020	All About March	Tarō Yamada	Lead role	
2020	Threads: Our Tapestry of Love	Naoki Takehara		
2021	Over the Town	Takeshi Mamiya		
2021	You're Not Normal, Either	Yasuomi Ōno	Lead role	
2021	Remain in Twilight	Kazuki Yoshio	Lead role	
2021	Homunculus	Manabu Itō		
2021	Belle	Shinobu Hisatake (voice)		
2022	Niwatori Phoenix	Rakuto Hoshino	Lead role	
2022	Just Remembering	Fumio		
2022	Convenience Story	Katō	Lead role	
2023	How to Find a Lover			
2024	Stolen Identity: Final Hacking Game	Urano	Lead role	
2024	Lust in the Rain	Yoshio	Lead role; Japanese-Taiwanese film	
2024	Oshi no Ko: The Final Act	Gorō Amamiya		
2025	A Moon in the Ordinary	Yuichi Kamata		
2025	Black Showman	Katsuki Kugimiya		
2026	#Spread	Shinji Asaoka	Lead role	
2026	Two Cigarettes, Three Nights	Haseo		

=== Television ===
Year	Title	Role	Notes	Ref.
2014	Flashback	Ryoma Kagami	Lead role	
2015	The Girl's Speech	Riku Okura		
2015	She	Haruto Muraoka		
2015	Lunch no Akko-chan	Ryuichiro Sasayama		
2015	Busu to Yaju	Sosuke Kitahara		
2015	Summer Stalkers Blues	Masahiko		
2015	Itsuka Tiffany de Breakfast o	Yuichi Mineta		
2016	Ramen Daisuki Koizumi-san 2016 Shinshun SP	Naruto Mitsukuni		
2016	Furenabaochin	Ryu Saeki		
2016	The Full-Time Wife Escapist	Natsuki Umehara		
2017	It's All About the Looks	Keiichi Sakaki		
2018	Laugh It Up!	Shun'ya Kitamura	Asadora	
2020	Alibi Breaker	Yūma Tokai		
2020–21	Ochoyan	Ippei Amami	Asadora	
2022	Duty and Revenge	Keisuke Fujiki	Lead role	
2022	Modern Love Tokyo	Kengo Shiota	Lead role; episode 4	
2024	A Suffocatingly Lonely Death	Jin Saeki	Lead role	
2024	Oshi no Ko	Gorō Amamiya		
2025	Love Is for the Dogs	Kai Shirosaki		
2026	Sounds of Winter	Yukio Saeki		

=== Video games ===
Year	Title	Role	Notes	Ref.
2024	Like a Dragon: Infinite Wealth	Eiji Mitamura		

=== Music video appearances ===
Year	Title	Artist	Ref.
2015	"Hachigatsu no Yoru"	Silent Siren	
2015	"Dare ni Datte Cinderella Story"	Rina Katahira	
2016	"Nigeru wa Hajidaga Yakunitatsu"	Charan Po Rantan	
2022	"Koi Kaze ni Nosete"	Vaundy	

== Bibliography ==
=== Magazines ===
Year	Title
2013	Men's Non-no

== Awards and nominations ==
Year	Award	Category	Nominated work(s)	Result	Ref.
2019	42nd Japan Academy Film Prize	Newcomer of the Year	Stolen Identity and The Antique	Won	
2019	44th Hochi Film Awards	Best Supporting Actor	Just Only Love, Farewell Song, and Chiwawa	Won	
2019	32nd Nikkan Sports Film Awards	Best Supporting Actor	Just Only Love, Farewell Song, Chiwawa, among others	Nominated	
2019	32nd Nikkan Sports Film Awards	Yūjirō Ishihara Newcomer Award	Just Only Love, Farewell Song, Chiwawa, among others	Won	
2020	39th Zenkoku Eiren Awards	Best Supporting Actor	Just Only Love, Farewell Song, Chiwawa, among others	Won	
2020	41st Yokohama Film Festival	Best Supporting Actor	Just Only Love, Farewell Song	Won	
2020	74th Mainichi Film Awards	Best Actor	Talking the Pictures	Won	
2020	74th Mainichi Film Awards	Best Supporting Actor	Just Only Love	Nominated	
2020	74th Mainichi Film Awards	Best Supporting Actor	Farewell Song	Nominated	
2020	62nd Blue Ribbon Awards	Best Actor	Talking the Pictures	Nominated	
2020	62nd Blue Ribbon Awards	Best Supporting Actor	Just Only Love, Farewell Song and the others	Nominated	
2020	93rd Kinema Junpo Awards	Best Supporting Actor	Just Only Love, Farewell Song and the others	Won	
2021	75th Mainichi Film Awards	Best Supporting Actor	The Cornered Mouse Dreams of Cheese	Nominated	
2021	63rd Blue Ribbon Awards	Best Supporting Actor	The Cornered Mouse Dreams of Cheese	Won	
2021	44th Japan Academy Film Prize	Best Supporting Actor	The Cornered Mouse Dreams of Cheese	Nominated	
2021	45th Elan d'or Awards	Newcomer of the Year	Himself	Won	
2026	39th Tokyo International Film Festival	Best Actor	Two Cigarettes, Three Nights	Won	
