= Synchro Tokimeki =

Single by Mayu Watanabe
- B-side: "Mittsuami no Kimi e"; "Shinjuku Yūtōsei" (Regular); "Lavender no Jūtan" (Limited A); "Mayuyuroid" (Limited B); "Saba no Kanzume" (Limited C)
- Released: February 29, 2012 (Japan)
- Genre: J-pop
- Label: Sony Music Japan
- Songwriter(s): Yasushi Akimoto (lyrics)
- Producer(s): Yasushi Akimoto

Mayu Watanabe singles chronology
"Synchro Tokimeki" (2012)	"Otona Jellybeans" (2012)

Music video
- Mayu Watanabe "Synchro Tokimeki" on YouTube

Professional ratings
Review scores
Source	Rating
Hotexpress / Billboard Japan	Favorable

"Synchro Tokimeki" (シンクロときめき, Shinkuro Tokimeki) is the debut solo single by Mayu Watanabe, released in Japan on February 29, 2012.

== Background ==
The single was released in four versions: Limited Edition A, Limited Edition B, Limited Edition C, and Regular Edition.

== Track listing ==
=== Regular edition ===
CD
No.	Title	Length
1.	"Synchro Tokimeki" (シンクロときめき Shinkuro Tokimeki)
2.	"Mittsuami no Kimi e" (三つ編みの君へ)
3.	"Shinjuku Yūtōsei" (新宿優等生)
4.	"Synchro Tokimeki (Instrumental)" (シンクロときめき（Instrumental）)
5.	"Mittsuami no Kimi e (Instrumental)" (三つ編みの君へ（Instrumental）)
6.	"Shinjuku Yūtōsei (Instrumental)" (新宿優等生（Instrumental）)

=== Limited edition A ===
CD
No.	Title	Length
1.	"Synchro Tokimeki" (シンクロときめき Shinkuro Tokimeki)
2.	"Mittsuami no Kimi e" (三つ編みの君へ)
3.	"Lavender no Jūtan" (ラベンダーのジュータン Rabendā no Jūtan)
4.	"Synchro Tokimeki (Instrumental)" (シンクロときめき（Instrumental）)
5.	"Mittsuami no Kimi e (Instrumental)" (三つ編みの君へ（Instrumental）)
6.	"Lavender no Jūtan (Instrumental)" (ラベンダーのジュータン（Instrumental）)

DVD
No.	Title	Length
1.	"Synchro Tokimeki (Music Video)" (シンクロときめき -MUSIC VIDEO-)
2.	"Making of Synchro Tokimeki" (Making of シンクロときめき)
3.	"Hanayome Shūgyō Ryōri Kenyūka, Yūki Mitsugu Sensei ni Deshiiri!" (花嫁修業 料理研究家・結城貢先生に弟子入り!)

=== Limited edition B ===
CD
No.	Title	Length
1.	"Synchro Tokimeki" (シンクロときめき Shinkuro Tokimeki)
2.	"Mittsuami no Kimi e" (三つ編みの君へ)
3.	"Mayuyuroid" (マユユロイド Mayuyuroido)
4.	"Synchro Tokimeki (Instrumental)" (シンクロときめき（Instrumental）)
5.	"Mittsuami no Kimi e (Instrumental)" (三つ編みの君へ（Instrumental）)
6.	"Mayuyuroid (Instrumental)" (マユユロイド（Instrumental）)

DVD
No.	Title	Length
1.	"Synchro Tokimeki (Music Video)" (シンクロときめき -MUSIC VIDEO-)
2.	"Making of Synchro Tokimeki" (Making of シンクロときめき)
3.	"Watanabe Mayu-shi (History of Mayu Watanabe)" (渡辺麻友史～History of Mayu Watanabe～)

=== Limited edition C ===
CD
No.	Title	Length
1.	"Synchro Tokimeki" (シンクロときめき Shinkuro Tokimeki)
2.	"Mittsuami no Kimi e" (三つ編みの君へ)
3.	"Saba no Kanzume" (サバの缶詰)
4.	"Synchro Tokimeki (Instrumental)" (シンクロときめき（Instrumental）)
5.	"Mittsuami no Kimi e (Instrumental)" (三つ編みの君へ（Instrumental）)
6.	"Saba no Kanzume (Instrumental)" (サバの缶詰（Instrumental）)

DVD
No.	Title	Length
1.	"Synchro Tokimeki (Music Video)" (シンクロときめき -MUSIC VIDEO-)
2.	"Making of Synchro Tokimeki" (Making of シンクロときめき)
3.	"Usa Shijimi 38sai. Watashi no Nichijō o Miseshi Mayuyu" (宇佐しじみ38歳。私の日常お見せしまゆゆ)

== Charts ==
Chart (2012)	Peak position
Oricon Daily Singles Chart	1
Oricon Weekly Singles Chart	2
Oricon Monthly Singles Chart	6
Oricon Yearly Singles Chart	50
Billboard Japan Hot 100	2
Billboard Japan Hot Top Airplay	26
Billboard Japan Hot Singles Sales	1
Billboard Japan Adult Contemporary Airplay	29
RIAJ Digital Track Chart	9
