= Otona Jellybeans =

Single by Mayu Watanabe
- B-side: "Saisho no Jack"; "Koyubi no Hohoemi" (Regular); "Itsu Demo Soba ni Ite Ageru" (Limited A); "Twin Tail wa mō Shinai" (Limited B); "Zannen Shōjo -Watanabe Mayu Ver.-" (Limited C)
- Released: July 5, 2012 (Japan)
- Genre: J-pop
- Label: Sony Music Japan
- Songwriter: Yasushi Akimoto (lyrics)
- Producer: Yasushi Akimoto

Mayu Watanabe singles chronology
"Synchro Tokimeki" (2012)	"Otona Jellybeans" (2012)	"Hikaru Monotachi" (2012)

Music video
- Mayu Watanabe "Otona Jellybeans" on YouTube

Professional ratings
Review scores
Source	Rating
Billboard Japan	Favorable

"Otona Jellybeans" (大人ジェリービーンズ, Otona Jerībīnzu) is the second single by Mayu Watanabe, released in Japan on July 5, 2012.

== Release ==
On July 19, Watanabe announced the release of her second single, "Otona Jellybeans" (translated "Adult Jelly Beans"), for July 25. She described the single as her type of song. Regarding the album cover, where she does not wear her trademark pigtails, she says she "tried to show my natural and mature side. It was fresh and fun." The single was released in four versions: Limited Edition A, Limited Edition B, Limited Edition C, and Regular Edition.

== Reception ==
The single reached number three on the Oricon weekly chart. It was also certified gold by RIAJ.

== Track listing ==
=== Regular Edition ===
CD
No.	Title	Length
1.	"Otona Jellybeans" (大人ジェリービーンズ Otona Jerībīnzu)
2.	"Saisho no Jack" (最初のジャック Saisho no Jakku)
3.	"Koyubi no Hohoemi" (小指の微笑み)
4.	"Otona Jellybeans (Instrumental)" (大人ジェリービーンズ（Instrumental）)
5.	"Saisho no Jack (Instrumental)" (最初のジャック（Instrumental）)
6.	"Koyubi no Hohoemi (Instrumental)" (小指の微笑み（Instrumental）)

=== Limited Edition A ===
CD
No.	Title	Length
1.	"Otona Jellybeans" (大人ジェリービーンズ Otona Jerībīnzu)
2.	"Saisho no Jack" (最初のジャック Saisho no Jakku)
3.	"Itsu Demo Soba ni Ite Ageru" (いつでも そばにいてあげる)
4.	"Otona Jelly Beans (Instrumental)" (大人ジェリービーンズ（Instrumental）)
5.	"Saisho no Jack (Instrumental)" (最初のジャック（Instrumental）)
6.	"Itsu Demo Soba ni Ite Ageru (Instrumental)" (いつでも そばにいてあげる（Instrumental）)

DVD
No.	Title	Length
1.	"Otona Jellybeans Music Video" (大人ジェリービーンズ Music Video)
2.	"Otona Jellybeans Music Video Making" (大人ジェリービーンズ Music Video メイキング)
3.	"Mayusatsu -Minna no Otona o Itadaki Mayuyu-" (麻友撮 -みんなの大人をいただきまゆゆ-)

=== Limited Edition B ===
CD
No.	Title	Artist(s)	Length
1.	"Otona Jellybeans" (大人ジェリービーンズ Otona Jerībīnzu)
2.	"Saisho no Jack" (最初のジャック Saisho no Jakku)
3.	"Twin Tail wa mō Shinai" (ツインテールはもうしない Tsuintēru wa mō Shinai)	Mayusaka46
4.	"Otona Jelly Beans (Instrumental)" (大人ジェリービーンズ（Instrumental）)
5.	"Saisho no Jack (Instrumental)" (最初のジャック（Instrumental）)
6.	"Twin Tail wa mō Shinai (Instrumental)" (ツインテールはもうしない（Instrumental）)

DVD
No.	Title	Artist(s)	Length
1.	"Otona Jellybeans Music Video" (大人ジェリービーンズ Music Video)
2.	"Otona Jellybeans Music Video Making" (大人ジェリービーンズ Music Video メイキング)
3.	"Twin Tail wa mō Shinai" (ツインテールはもうしない / まゆ坂46 Music Video)	Mayusaka46

=== Limited Edition C ===
CD
No.	Title	Length
1.	"Otona Jellybeans" (大人ジェリービーンズ Otona Jerībīnzu)
2.	"Saisho no Jack" (最初のジャック Saisho no Jakku)
3.	"Zannen Shōjo -Watanabe Mayu Ver.-" (残念少女 -渡辺麻友 Ver.-)
4.	"Otona Jelly Beans (Instrumental)" (大人ジェリービーンズ（Instrumental）)
5.	"Saisho no Jack (Instrumental)" (最初のジャック（Instrumental）)
6.	"Zannen Shōjo -Watanabe Mayu Ver.- (Instrumental)" (残念少女 -渡辺麻友 Ver.-（Instrumental）)

DVD
No.	Title	Length
1.	"Otona Jellybeans Music Video" (大人ジェリービーンズ Music Video)
2.	"Otona Jellybeans Music Video Making" (大人ジェリービーンズ Music Video メイキング)
3.	"Watanabe Mayu × Hirajima Natsumi" (渡辺麻友 × 平嶋夏海)

== Charts ==
Chart (2012)	Peak position
Oricon Daily Singles Chart	2
Oricon Weekly Singles Chart	3
Oricon Yearly Singles Chart	73
Billboard Japan Hot 100	3
Billboard Japan Hot Top Airplay	19
Billboard Japan Hot Singles Sales	2
Billboard Japan Adult Contemporary Airplay	56
RIAJ Digital Track Chart	9
