= Mayu Watanabe =

Japanese retired singer and actress (born 1994)

Mayu Watanabe 渡辺 麻友
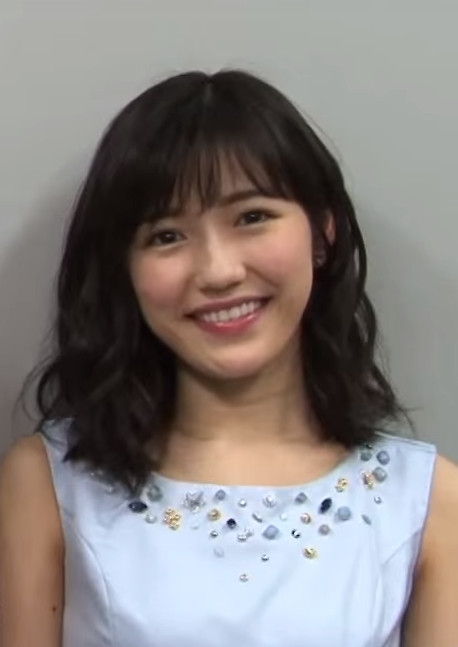
- Watanabe in 2016

Background information
- Also known as: Mayuyu (まゆゆ)
- Born: March 26, 1994 (age 32)
- Origin: Saitama Prefecture, Japan
- Genre: J-pop
- Years active: 2006–2020
- Label: Sony Music (solo)
- Formerly of: AKB48, Watarirouka Hashiritai
- Website: watanabe-mayu.jp

Mayu Watanabe (渡辺 麻友, Watanabe Mayu; born March 26, 1994) is a Japanese retired singer and actress. Nicknamed Mayuyu (まゆゆ), her entertainment career was associated with the idol girl group AKB48 under Team B. In the annual AKB48 General Elections event, she had consistently been voted by fans to rank among the group's top members. She has released five solo singles, many of which have peaked in the top ten on the Oricon charts, and one solo album. She left the group on the last day of 2017 and the first day of 2018, and pursued an acting career until she retired from the entertainment industry in June 2020.

== Career ==
=== AKB48 ===
Watanabe auditioned for AKB48's 3rd generation and was placed in the newly formed Team B, serving as a key memberof the group. Her selection on "Bingo!" marked the first appearance of a Team B member in an AKB48 single title track. She would go on to appear on all of the a-side tracks for AKB48's singles until her graduation, with the exception of line-ups determined by rock-paper-scissors tournaments.

In 2009, Watanabe placed fourth overall in the group's first general election to determine the line-up for the group's 13th single, and ranked fifth the next year for the group's 17th single.

Watanabe appeared on the cover of the December 2010 issue of UP to boy magazine together with Airi Suzuki from Cute. It was the first gravure collaboration between Hello! Project and AKB48.

On May 13, 2011, Watanabe released her first photo book, Mayuyu. She commented that the book "is filled with a lot of expressions that I haven't shown until now, it's a book I'm really pleased with!" Regarding her cover picture, she said, "Despite being embarrassed, I did my best on the front cover, so I want a lot of people to look at it!" For AKB48's general election in 2011, Watanabe placed fifth overall.

In 2012, Watanabe played her first lead role in the Japanese TV drama Saba Doru, where she played a 38-year-old high school teacher hated by her pupils, whilst having a hidden life as the highly popular idol Mayu Watanabe, based on her real-life self. On February 29, Watanabe released her debut solo single, "Synchro Tokimeki", which was also the opening theme for the drama.

Watanabe participated as a voice actress in the anime series AKB0048. In the anime, she plays a main character Chieri Sono, and is part of the AKB48 subgroup NO NAME, which sings the opening and ending themes for the series. The series features a supporting character, Mayu Watanabe Mark 3, which is modeled after her likeness, and is voiced by Yukari Tamura. She reprised her role as Chieri Sono for the series' second season which aired in 2013.

Watanabe ranked second overall in the 2012 AKB48 general elections with 72,574 votes. On August 24, she was moved from Team B to Team A during AKB48's reorganization announcement at their Tokyo Dome concert.

On July 25, she released her second solo single, "Otona Jellybeans" which reached number three on the Oricon weekly chart. Her third solo single "Hikaru Monotachi" was released on November 21, 2012, and reached number one in the Oricon singles chart. The single was released in five versions, including one that has an illustration book. Its b-side "Sayonara no Hashi" is the theme song to the anime film Nerawareta Gakuen for which she voiced one of the lead characters. In July 2013, she released her fourth solo single, "Rappa Renshūchū". A contest was held to determine the cover artwork for one of its editions.

Meanwhile in AKB48, she received her first center position with the group's 30th single "So Long!", which was released on February 20, 2013. On April 19, she released her second photobook Seifuku Zukan Saigo no Seifuku. In the AKB48 election for the members for their 32nd major label single, she placed third overall with 101,210 votes.

In 2014, Watanabe became a regular on the television show Utage!, and a semi-regular on the TV show Renai Sosenkyo. In AKB48, she was transferred back from Team A to Team B in the "Daisokaku Matsuri". She performed an hour-long solo live concert at AKB48's Natsu Matsuri. She earned the center position for AKB48's 37th major label single, "Kokoro no Placard" after placing first with 159,854 votes in an election to determine the single's member line-up.

In 2015, Watanabe received her first leading role in a prime-time TV drama, Tatakau! Shoten Girl, broadcast by Fuji TV and Kansai TV. This drama aired from April 2015, at 10 pm. The theme song for this drama, "Deai no Tsuzuki", was sung by Watanabe, and was also released as her fifth solo single on June 10, 2015. She held solo live concerts to support the single on September 19. In 2015, a web poll conducted by My Navi Student declared her the second cutest idol amongst both men and women, behind Kanna Hashimoto of the idol group Rev. from DVL.

On October 26, 2016, Watanabe released her third photobook Shiranai uchi ni.

On June 17, 2017, Watanabe announced at the 9th General Election that she would graduate from the group. On October 31, Watanabe had her graduation concert. Her last handshake event with the group was on November 18, while her last performance at the AKB48 theater was on December 26. Her last activity as an AKB48 member was a performance at the "68th NHK Kouhaku Uta Gassen" on December 31, 2017.

==== AKB48 General Elections ====
Her results in the annual ranking:

- Ranked 4th in the 2009 General Election (1st)
- Ranked 5th in the 2010 General Election (2nd)
- Ranked 5th in the 2011 General Election (3rd)
- Ranked 2nd in the 2012 General Election (4th)
- Ranked 3rd in the 2013 General Election (5th)
- Ranked 1st in the 2014 General Election (6th)
- Ranked 3rd in the 2015 General Election (7th)
- Ranked 2nd in the 2016 General Election (8th)
- Ranked 2nd in the 2017 General Election (9th)

=== Post-AKB48 ===
In January 2018, it was announced that Watanabe would play the titular character in the Japanese production of the Amélie adapted from the movie of the same title. The production ran from May 18 to June 3 at the Galaxy Theater in Shinagawa, Tokyo, and June 7–10 at the Morinomiya Piloti Hall in Osaka.

In April 2018, Watanabe had her first drama post-AKB48 titled Gan Shoumetsu no Wana ~Kanzen Kankai no Nazo~ (がん消滅の罠 ～完全寛解の謎～) where she played an insurance investigator.

In August 2018, Watanabe starred in the special drama Meibugyou! Tooyama no Kinshirou (名奉行！遠山の金四郎), a continuation from the same series in 2017.

Following two special dramas, Watanabe then had the lead role in a late-night drama Itsuka Kono Ame ga Yamu Hi Made (いつかこの雨がやむ日まで) in August 2018. Her character, Hikari, was a girl whose dream was to become a musical actress, but got her dreams smashed when her brother supposedly committed murder.

In late 2018, Watanabe also endorsed the brand Yakult. The commercial was directed by Ikeda Kazumasa who has directed music videos for Keyakizaka46 and Nogizaka46, while choreography was by Sasao Isao who choreographed one of Keyakizaka46's singles. The commercial also features some 33 professional dancers and performers including Spinboy Aichi, SORI and HICKY of the dance team SHIFFLE!! among others.

Watanabe also guested several music shows, namely Utacon and UTAGE. In Utacon, she sang musical songs, including collaborations with several famed musical actors.

Towards the end of 2018, Watanabe was named the ambassador for JAL Honolulu Marathon.

On June 1, 2020, Production Ogi announced her retirement from the entertainment industry for health reasons. Her website was terminated amicably on the same day.

== Personal life ==
Tokyo Mode describes Watanabe as a girl who used to be an "otaku obsessed with illustrations, anime, and special effects shows". Her public appearances were often accompanied by life-sized animated characters and many fans wore such costumes at her meet-and-greet events. In several episodes of the AKB48 variety show AKBingo!, she demonstrated her specialty of drawing various manga characters in seconds. She also unofficially endorsed the character Pompompurin for the 30th Sanrio Character Awards in 2015.

One of her favorite series is Hetalia. Her favorite character is France, and she says he is her ideal type. She also enjoys surfing the internet, and often used internet slang terms in her blog posts. According to Yuki Kashiwagi, Mayu's blog posts are 80% anime content on average.

She is a musical theater enthusiast and attends performances both in Japan and overseas. She has also performed with the all-female troupe Takarazuka Revue.

AKB48 Group producer and lyricist Yasushi Akimoto once commented that she was born for the sake of being an idol. In the early years of her career she was called "CG" or "cyborg" due to her classic, orthodox idol appearance. However, the nickname became less common as she grew older and her personality changed. A notable turning point was in 2012 when she stopped wearing her hair in her signature twintail style. Until then, she had been very particular about her hairstyle and took great care setting her bangs. Kikuchi Ayaka once shared that she would take up to two hours to set her bangs, and Nakagawa Haruka joked that "if you touch Mayu's bangs, you will be killed."

== Discography ==
=== Solo singles ===
Year	No.	Title	Release date	Chart position				Sales (Oricon)	
Year	No.	Title	Release date	Oricon Weekly Singles Chart	Billboard Japan Hot 100*	RIAJ Digital Track Chart*	TWN Combo	First week	Total
2012	1	"Synchro Tokimeki" (シンクロときめき)	February 29, 2012	2	2	9		123,237	158,884
2012	2	"Otona Jellybeans" (大人ジェリービーンズ)	July 25, 2012	3	3	9	14	87,993	109,309
2012	3	"Hikaru Monotachi" (ヒカルものたち)	November 21, 2012	1	3			91,907	122,381
2013	4	"Rappa Renshūchū" (ラッパ練習中)	July 10, 2013	3	5			67,329	95,379
2015	5	"Deai no Tsuzuki" (出逢いの続き)	June 10, 2015	2	3			48,240	-

* RIAJ Digital Track Chart was established in April 2009 and cancelled in July 2012.

=== Solo albums ===
Year	Title	Chart position	
Year	Title	Oricon Weekly Albums Chart	Billboard Japan Hot 100
2017	Best Regards!	5	

=== AKB48 ===
Year	No.	Title	Role	Notes
2007	4	"Bingo!"	A-side	First single with Team B.
2007	5	"Boku no Taiyō"	A-side	
2007	6	"Yūhi o Miteiru ka?"	A-side	
2008	7	"Romance, Irane"	A-side	
2008	8	"Sakura no Hanabiratachi 2008"	A-side	
2008	9	"Baby! Baby! Baby!"	A-side	
2008	10	"Ōgoe Diamond"	A-side	
2009	11	"10nen Sakura"	A-side	Also sang on "Sakurairo no Sora no Shita de"
2009	12	"Namida Surprise!"	A-side	
2009	13	"Iiwake Maybe"	A-side	Ranked 4th in 2009 General Election.
2009	14	"River"	A-side	
2010	15	"Sakura no Shiori"	A-side	Also sang on "Majisuka Rock 'n' Roll".
2010	16	"Ponytail to Shushu"	A-side	Also sang on "Majijo Teppen Blues".
2010	17	"Heavy Rotation"	A-side	Ranked 5th in 2010 General Election. Also sang on "Yasai Sisters" and "Lucky Seven"
2010	18	"Beginner"	A-side	
2010	19	"Chance no Junban"	B-side	Did not sing on title track; lineup was determined by rock-paper-scissors tournament. Sang on "Yoyakushita Christmas", and "Love Jump" (as Team B)
2011	20	"Sakura no Ki ni Narō"	A-side	
2011	–	"Dareka no Tame ni – What can I do for someone?"	–	charity single
2011	21	"Everyday, Katyusha"	A-side	Also sang on "Korekara Wonderland" and "Yankee Soul".
2011	22	"Flying Get"	A-side	Ranked 5th in 2011 General Election. Also sang on "Seishun to Kizukanai Mama", "Ice no Kuchizuke", "Yasai Uranai"
2011	23	"Kaze wa Fuiteiru"	A-side	
2011	24	"Ue kara Mariko"	B-side	Did not sing on title track; lineup was determined by rock-paper-scissors tournament. Sang on "Noel no Yoru", and "Yobisute Fantasy" (as Team B)
2012	25	"Give Me Five!"	A-side (Baby Blossom)	Played keyboard in Baby Blossom. Also sang on "Hitsujikai no Tabi".
2012	26	"Manatsu no Sounds Good!"	A-side	Center Also sang on "Chōdai, Darling!"and "Kimi no Tame ni Boku wa...".
2012	27	"Gingham Check"	A-side	Ranked 2nd in 2012 General Election. Also sang on "Yume no Kawa".
2012	28	"Uza"	A-side	Also sang on "Kodoku na Hoshizora".
2012	29	"Eien Pressure"	B-side	Did not sing on title track; lineup was determined by rock-paper-scissors tournament. Also sang on "Totteoki Christmas" and "Eien Yori Tsuzuku You ni" as OKL48. First single as member of Team A.
2013	30	"So Long!"	A-side, Center	Also sang on "Ruby".
2013	31	"Sayonara Crawl"	A-side, Center	This single had four centers.
2013	32	"Koi Suru Fortune Cookie"	A-side	Ranked 3rd in 2013 General Election.
2013	33	"Heart Electric"	A-side	In main lineup with the nickname Elizabeth. Also sang on "Kisu made Countdown" as Team A.
2013	34	"Suzukake no Ki no Michi de "Kimi no Hohoemi o Yume ni Miru" to Itte Shimattara Bokutachi no Kankei wa Dō Kawatte Shimau no ka, Bokunari ni Nan-nichi ka Kangaeta Ue de no Yaya Kihazukashii Ketsuron no Yō na Mono"	B-side	Did not sing on title track; lineup was determined by rock-paper-scissors tournament. Sang on "Mosh & Dive". Sang on "Party is Over".
2014	35	"Mae Shika Mukanee"	A-side	
2014	36	"Labrador Retriever"	A-side, Center	Also sang on "Kyou Made no Melody" and "B Garden"
2014	37	"Kokoro no Placard"	A-side, Center	Ranked 1st in 2014 General Election. Also sang on "Sailor Zombie" as Milk Planet and "Oshiete Mommy".
2014	38	"Kibouteki Refrain"	A-side, Center	Center performer along with Sakura Miyawaki. Also sang on "Loneliness Club".
2015	39	"Green Flash"	A-side	Also sang "Haru no Hikari Chikadzuita Natsu" and "Hakimono to Kasa no Monogatari"
2015	40	"Bokutachi wa Tatakawanai"	A-side	Also sang "Barebare Bushi" and "Kimi no Dai-Ni Shou"
2015	41	"Halloween Night"	A-side	Ranked 3rd in 2015 General Election. Also sang on "Ippome Ondo"
2015	42	"Kuchibiru ni Be My Baby"	A-Side	Also sang on "365 Nichi no Kamihikouki" as Asa ga Kita Senbatsu, "Senaka Kotoba", and "Kin no Hane wo Motsu Hito yo" as Team B.
2016	43	"Kimi wa Melody"	A-side	Marked as the 10th Anniversary Single.
2016	44	"Tsubasa wa Iranai"	A-side	Sang on "Koi o Suru to Baka o Miru" as Team B.
2016	45	"LOVE TRIP / Shiawase wo Wakenasai"	A-side	Also sang on "Hikari to Kage no Hibi" and "Black Flower".
2016	46	"High Tension"	A-side	
2017	47	"Shoot Sign"	A-side	Also sang on "Kanashii Uta wo Kikitaku Natta" as MayuYukirn.
2017	48	"Negaigoto no Mochigusare"	A-side	Also sang on "Maebure" which she is the Center.
2017	49	"#Sukinanda"	A-side	Ranked 2nd in 2017 General Election.
2017	50	"11gatsu no Anklet"	A-side, Center	Last single to participate. Also sang on "Sayonara de Owaru Wake Janai" which is her graduation song.

== Appearances ==
=== Stage units ===
Team B 1st Stage "Seishun Girls" (青春ガールズ)

1. "Ame no Dōbutsuen" (雨の動物園)
2. "Fusidara na Natsu" (ふしだらな夏)

Team B 2nd Stage "Aitakatta" (会いたかった)

1. "Nageki no Figure" (嘆きのフィギュア)
2. "Nagisa no Cherry" (渚のCHERRY)
3. "Senaka Kara Dakishimete" (背中から抱きしめて)
4. "Rio no Kakumei" (リオの革命)
5. "Skirt, Hirari" (スカート、ひらり)

Team B 3rd Stage "Pajama Drive" (パジャマドライブ)

1. "Pajama Drive" (パジャマドライブ)

Team B 4th Stage "Idol no Yoake" (アイドルの夜明け)

1. "Zannen Shōjo" (残念少女)

Team B 5th Stage "Theater no Megami" (シアターの女神)

1. "Hatsukoi yo Konnichiwa" (初恋よ こんにちは)

Team A Waiting Stage "Waiting Stage" (ウェイティング公演)

1. "Skirt, Hirari" (スカート、ひらり)
2. "Glass no I LOVE YOU" (ガラスの I LOVE YOU)
3. "Candy" (キャンディー) (new units)

Team Surprise 1st Stage "Juuryoku Sympathy" (重力シンパシー)

1. "Suiyoubi no Alice" (水曜日のアリス)
2. "Kimi no C/W" (君のc/w)
3. "Megami wa Doko de Hohoemu?" (女神はどこで微笑む？)

Team B 3rd Stage "Pajama Drive" (パジャマドライブ) (revival)

1. "Temodemo no Namida" (てもでもの涙)

Team Surprise 2nd Stage "Bara no Gishiki" (バラの儀式)

1. "Hatsukoi no Kagi" (初恋の鍵)
2. "Youchien no Sensei" (幼稚園の先生)

Kizaki Team B Stage "Tadaima Renaichuu" (ただいま 恋愛中) (original stage is Team A 4th Stage)

1. "Haru ga Kuru Made" (春が来るまで)

=== Variety ===
- AKB 1ji 59fun (2008)
- AKB 0ji 59fun (2008)
- AKB Nemōsu TV (AKBネ申テレビ) (2008–2016 )
- AKBingo! (2008–2017 )
- Shūkan AKB (週刊AKB) (2009–2012)
- Naruhodo High School (2011–2012 )
- Gachigase AKB (2012–)
- Kayoukyoku (2012–)
- GIRLS' FACTORY (2012)
- Generation Tengoku (2013-2014)
- UTAGE! (2014-2015)
- Momm!! (2015-2016)
- Tribecca (2016)
- Green & Blacks (2017)

=== Dramas ===
- Majisuka Gakuen (2010) – Nezumi
- Sakura Kara no Tegami (桜からの手紙) (2011) – Herself
- Majisuka Gakuen 2 (2011) – Nezumi
- Saba Doru (2012) – Herself, Usa Shijimi
- So Long! (2013) – Herself
- Fortune Cookies (2013) – Herself
- Sailor Zombie (2014) – Member of idol group, Milk Planet; Mayu
- Majisuka Gakuen 4 (2015) – Nezumi (ep.10)
- Tatakau! Shoten Girl (2015) – Kitamura Aki
- Majisuka Gakuen 5 (2015) – Nezumi (ep.2)
- AKB Horror Night: Adrenaline's Night Ep.7 - Elevator (2015) - Mayumi
- Ōoku (2016) - Oshima
- Crow's Blood (2016) - Kaori Isozaki
- Chihoushi wo Kau Onna (2016) - Yukino
- AKB Love Night Koi Koujou (2016) - Amelia (ep.35)
- Cabasuka Gakuen (2016) - Nezumi (Utsubo) (ep.3)
- Sayonara, Enari-kun (2017) - Kiriyama Saori
- Meibugyou! Tooyama no Kinshirou (2017) - Otane
- Gan Shoumetsu no Wana ~Kanzen Kankai no Nazo~ (2018) - Mizushima Ruriko
- Itsuka Kono Ame ga Yamu Hi Made (2018) - Kitazono (Morimura) Hikari
- Meibugyou! Tooyama no Kinshirou (2018) - Otane
- Kishuhanshu Tokugawa Yoshimune (2019) - Ichi
- Natsuzora (2019) - Akane Mimura

=== Musicals ===
- Amélie (2018) - Amélie
- City of Angels (2018) - Mallory Kingsley

=== Radio ===
- AKB48 Ashitamade Mōchotto (AKB48明日までもうちょっと。) (2008 – present, JOQR-AM)

=== Anime ===
- AKB0048 (2012) – Chieri Sono
- Nerawareta Gakuen (2012 film) – Natsuki
- AKB0048 Next Stage (2013) – Chieri Sono
- Pikachu, Kore Nan no Kagi? (2014) - Narration
- Maho Girls PreCure! (2016) – herself

=== Movies ===
- Three Day Boys (スリーデイボーイズ)
- Percy Jackson: Sea of Monsters (2013) – Annabeth Chase (Japanese dub)

=== Photobooks ===
- Mayuyu (2011)
- Seifuku Zukan Saigo no Seifuku (April 19, 2013)
- Shiranai uchi ni (October 25, 2016)

=== Others ===
- MUSIC FAIR (2012-) - irregular guest appearances
- Jounetsu Tairiku (2015)
- N Kyo CLASSIC&POPS with SPECIAL ARTISTS (2016)
- Watanabe Mayu ~AKB48 Sotsugyou Made no 63nichi-kan ni Micchaku, Soshite Sono Mirai~ (2018)
