= It Feels So Good (film) =

- Theatrical release poster
- 火口のふたり
- Directed by: Haruhiko Arai
- Screenplay by: Haruhiko Arai
- Based on: Kakō no Futari by Kazufumi Shiraishi
- Produced by: Ryo Yukizane; Takashi Tanabe
- Starring: Tasuku Emoto; Kumi Takiuchi
- Edited by: Chieko Suzaki
- Music by: Itsuroh Shimoda
- Release date: August 23, 2019 (Japan)
- Running time: 105 minutes
- Country: Japan
- Language: Japanese

It Feels So Good (Japanese: 火口のふたり, Hepburn: Kakō no Futari) is a 2019 erotic drama written and directed by Haruhiko Arai, based on the novel by Kazufumi Shiraishi. It was named Best Film of 2019 in the 2020 Kinema Junpo Awards.

== Plot ==
Kenji (Tasuku Emoto) receives a call from his father asking him to come home to Akita for the wedding of Naoki (Kumi Takiuchi), an old friend he has not seen in many years. Upon their reunion, it is revealed they once were lovers and quickly fall into an affair, which they agree will last only until Naoki's husband-to-be, a military man away on business, returns home for the wedding. Over the course of five days they reconnect, have a lot of sex, talk about their past together, other relationships, and the after-effects the Fukushima Daiichi nuclear disaster on their lives. The film is primarily a two-hander, with the only other characters appearing incidentally or offscreen.

== Cast ==
- Tasuku Emoto as Kenji Nagahara
- Kumi Takiuchi as Naoko Sato
- Akira Emoto as Kenji's Father (voice)

== Reception ==
=== Critical response ===
James Hadfield of The Japan Times praised the actors' "convincing chemistry" and found the film managed to be "explicit without being gratuitous" with "a welcome frankness in the film’s depictions of sex," noting "a common theme of people surrendering to private passion in the face of more momentous events beyond their control" with Arai's previous work. James Marsh of the South China Morning Post was less kind, calling the film "an interminable bore" and stating "Nothing remotely arousing is created during the numerous sex scenes, which are interspersed with dollops of pseudointellectual gibberish."

=== Awards and nominations ===
Award	Category	Recipients	Result	Ref.
Eiga Geijutsu	Best Film	Haruhiko Arai	Won	
Kinema Junpo Awards	Best Film	Haruhiko Arai	Won	
Kinema Junpo Awards	Best Actress	Kumi Takiuchi	Won	
Mainichi Film Awards	Best Film	Haruhiko Arai	Nominated	
Yokohama Film Festival	Best Film	Haruhiko Arai	Won	
