= Just Only Love =

2018 Japanese romantic comedy-drama film

- Theatrical release poster
- Directed by: Rikiya Imaizumi
- Screenplay by: Rikiya Imaizumi; Kaori Sawai
- Based on: Just Only Love by Mitsuyo Kakuta
- Starring: Yukino Kishii; Ryo Narita; Mai Fukagawa; Ryuya Wakaba
- Cinematography: Hiroshi Iwanaga
- Edited by: Takashi Sato
- Music by: Gary Ashiya
- Distributed by: Elephant House
- Release dates: October 28, 2018 (Tokyo International Film Festival); April 2019 (Japan)
- Running time: 123 minutes
- Country: Japan
- Language: Japanese

Just Only Love (Japanese: 愛がなんだ, Hepburn: Ai ga nanda; lit. What Is Love?) is a 2018 Japanese romantic comedy-drama film directed by Rikiya Imaizumi. Based on the novel of the same name by Mitsuyo Kakuta, the film stars Yukino Kishii, Ryo Narita, Mai Fukagawa, and Ryuya Wakaba.

The film premiered at the 2018 Tokyo International Film Festival, and received a theatrical release in Japan in April 2019.

== Cast ==
- Yukino Kishii as Teruko Yamada
- Ryo Narita as Mamoru Tanaka
- Mai Fukagawa as Yoko Sakamoto
- Ryuya Wakaba as Sei Nakahara
- Noriko Eguchi as Sumire

== Reception ==
James Hadfield of The Japan Times gave the film a score of three out of five stars, calling it "an honest depiction of the vague boundaries of 20-something romance, and takes the time to show its unequal relationships from both sides."
