= Kazé =

French publishing company

- Type: Société par actions simplifiée
- Industry: Entertainment
- Founded: September 21, 1994; 32 years ago (original); April 2026; 6 months ago (relaunch)
- Founder: Cédric Littardi
- Defunct: October 1, 2022; 4 years ago (original)
- Fate: Folded into Crunchyroll (original)
- Headquarters: Paris, France
- Area served: Europe
- Key people: Kazuyoshi Takeuchi
- Products: Anime; manga; films
- Parent: Otter Media (2019–2021); Crunchyroll EMEA (2021–2022); HarperCollins (2025–present)
- Website: www.kaze.fr

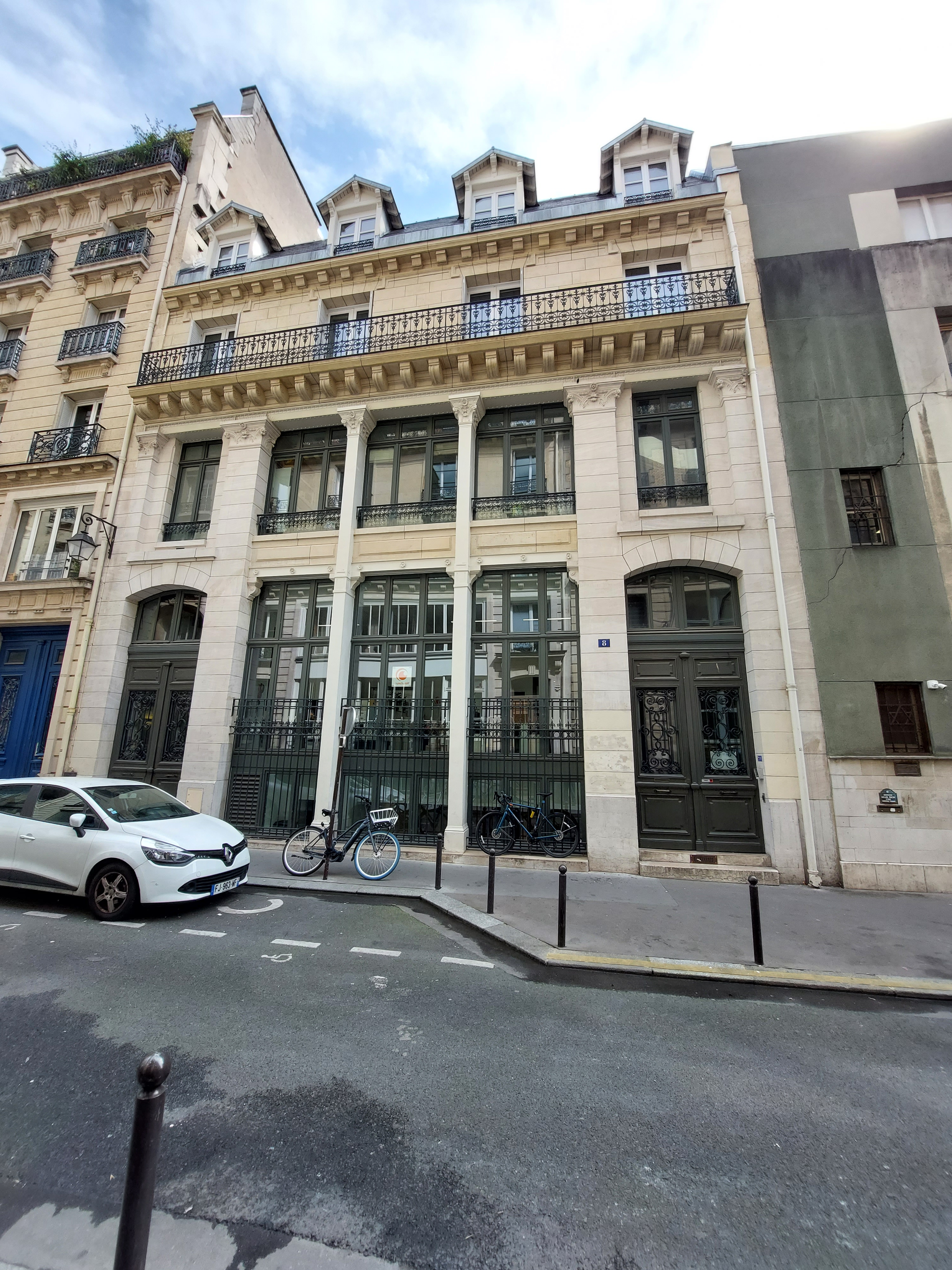
Head office of Kazé/Crunchyroll France

Kazé is a French publishing company that specializes in anime and manga. Founded in 1994 and headquartered in the 9th arrondissement of Paris, Kazé specializes in the distribution of Japanese anime and manga for the European market.

Kazé was first acquired by Viz Media Europe in 2009, then by WarnerMedia (today known as Warner Bros. Discovery) via Otter Media, which was then followed by Sony via Crunchyroll EMEA, and currently though HarperCollins after it acquired Crunchyroll's French and German manga publishing operations, which included Kazé in September 2025. HarperCollins would later relaunch the company into its current form in April 2026. An American division, Kazé US is planned to be launched in 2027.

== History ==
Kazé was first founded in 1994 and debuted by publishing Record of Lodoss War on VHS.

In 2005, Kazé launched its music label, Wasabi Records, specializing in J-Pop. In the last few years, the company has diversified its activities by publishing Japanese animated feature films, such as Appleseed, Origin: Spirits of the Past and The Girl Who Leapt Through Time. In 2007, Kazé released Shinobi, its first live-action film, to theaters in France, and in July 2009, Kazé launched its own television channel, KZTV (Kazé TV), devoted to anime. Around the same time, Kazé experimented with online streaming with the launch of its anime streaming service, KZPlay in October 2009, which would later merge with another streaming service, Genzai, to form a new anime streaming service known as Anime Digital Network (today known as Animation Digital Network) in 2013.

On August 28, 2009, Kazé announced its acquisition by Viz Media Europe, a subsidiary of Shogakukan and Shueisha.

Kaze changed its name to Kazé in 2010, in hopes that the addition of an accent would allow for a better pronunciation of its name. It published numerous series of Japanese animations in French and became one of the largest independent publishers of video and manga in Europe.

Before the purchase, the company's manga was published under the Asuka imprint. Since January 2010, only yaoi titles have been released under the Asuka imprint; the majority of titles were moved to the company's new Kazé imprint, including later volumes of non-yaoi series started under the Asuka imprint. Asuka's current licenses include a broad spectrum of manga: popular shōnen and shōjo series such as After School Nightmare, more mature seinen and josei titles such as Bokurano, and classic manga such as Black Jack and works by Osamu Tezuka. They also publish several yaoi and yuri titles, including a French edition of Be x Boy magazine.

The company also published in Germany, Italy, United Kingdom, Spain, Austria, Russia & Poland.

In May 2012, Cédric Littardi, the founder and long-time head of the company, announced his departure.

Kazé and Média-Participations (via its Dargaud and Citel, and Kana subsidiaries) launched Anime Digital Network in October 2013, a French anime streaming service which formed from a merger between two previous anime streaming platforms Genzai and KZPlay. During the Sony ownership in July 2022, Kazé relinquished its ownership of ADN, leaving Média-Participations as the full owner. Anime Digital Network changed its name to Animation Digital Network following Kazé's departure from ADN.

On June 1, 2022, Crunchyroll announced that Kazé and its labels will be rebranded as Crunchyroll. The rebranding became effective on October 1, 2022.

On July 16, 2025, HarperCollins announced that it has acquired the French and German Crunchyroll manga publishing business (including Kazé), with the acquisition being closed on September 30, 2025.

On December 10, 2025, HarperCollins announced that the Kazé label would be brought back for new licenses from April 2026.

On August 25, 2026, HarperCollins announced that Kazé will expand to the American market with the planned launch of Kazé US in 2027, under the leadership of publisher Andrew Arnold who also managed the HarperAlley imprint.

== Italian dubs ==
In 2012, the French company has received criticism from Italy regarding the publication of Black Lagoon: Roberta's Blood Trail (series OVA), Mardock Scramble: the First Compression, and Children Who Chase Lost Voices. Instead of giving the job to an Italian dubbing studio, as with previous releases, Kazé opted for a French dubbing studio named Wantake, which used amateur voice actors of Italian-French nationality. The resulting performance was regarded as poor. Criticism was also directed towards the menu systems on the DVDs, which featured inaccurate translations. On Amazon.com, titles have received numerous negative reviews owing to these perceived failings, and the company was flooded with negative comments via Twitter and Facebook.

== Anime published ==
=== Anime published in France ===
- Appleseed XIII
- Bleach
- Yo-kai Watch

=== Anime published in UK ===
- Bakuman (Sub-only release)
- Berserk: The Golden Age Arc
- Black Lagoon
- Black Lagoon: Roberta's Blood Trail
- Bleach (Seasons 9-16, Movies 3 and 4)
- Code Geass (Both seasons)
- Future Diary
- JoJo's Bizarre Adventure (Season 1 only)
- Magi: The Labyrinth of Magic
- Mardock Scramble
- Mawaru Panguindrum
- Nisekoi
- Nura: Rise of the Yokai Clan
- One-Punch Man
- Persona 4: The Animation
- Princess Jellyfish
- Tiger & Bunny
- Trigun: Badlands Rumble
- Un-Go
- World Conquest Zvezda Plot

=== Anime published in Germany ===
- Attack on Titan
- Cat's Eye
- Fairy Tail
- Inuyasha
- Phantom Thief Jeanne
- Sailor Moon
- Shimoneta: A Boring World Where the Concept of Dirty Jokes Doesn't Exist
- Yo-kai Watch

=== Anime published in Spain ===
- Black Lagoon

=== Anime published in Italy ===
- Hellsing Ultimate

== Manga ==
- Black Rose Alice
- Initial D
- The Promised Neverland

== Kazé Anime Nights ==
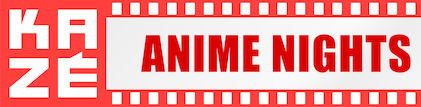
Logo of Kazé Anime Nights

Kazé Anime Nights is a cinema event, where Kazé screens anime films and sometimes Asian films across Germany and Austria for one day or multiple days.

=== Films of Kazé Anime Nights and Asia Nights 2018 ===
| Title | Release date |
|---|---|
| Tokyo Ghoul | February 2, 2018 |
| Tokyo Ghoul | February 27, 2018 |
| The Virgin Psychics | March 2, 2018 |
| Detective Conan: The Crimson Love Letter | March 27, 2018 |
| 100 Yen Love | April 6, 2018 |
| Fairy Tail the Movie: Phoenix Priestess | April 24, 2018 |
| Death Note: Light Up the New World | May 4, 2018 |
| Detective Conan Episode One | May 29, 2018 |
| Persona Non Grata | June 1, 2018 |
| Attack on Titan Movie Part 3 | June 26, 2018 |
| A Day | July 6, 2018 |
| Fairy Tail: Dragon Cry | July 31, 2018 |
| Corpse Party | August 3, 2018 |
| Black Butler: Book of the Atlantic | August 28, 2018 |
| Lu over the Wall | September 25, 2018 |
| The Night Is Short, Walk On Girl | October 30, 2018 |

=== Films of Kazé Anime Nights 2019 ===
| Title | Release date |
|---|---|
| Dragon Ball Super: Broly | January 29, 2019 |
| Love, Chunibyo & Other Delusions! Take on Me | February 26, 2019 |
| My Hero Academia: Two Heroes | March 26, 2019 |
| The adventures of young Sinbad | April 30, 2019 |
| Mirai | May 28, 2019 |
| Detective Conan: Zero the Enforcer | June 25, 2019 |
| Dragon Ball Super: Broly | July 30, 2019 |
| Okko's Inn | August 27, 2019 |
| Lupin the 3rd vs. Detective Conan: The Movie | August 27, 2019 |
| One Piece: Stampede | September 24, 2019 |
| Penguin Highway | October 29, 2019 |
