= Nogizaka46 discography =

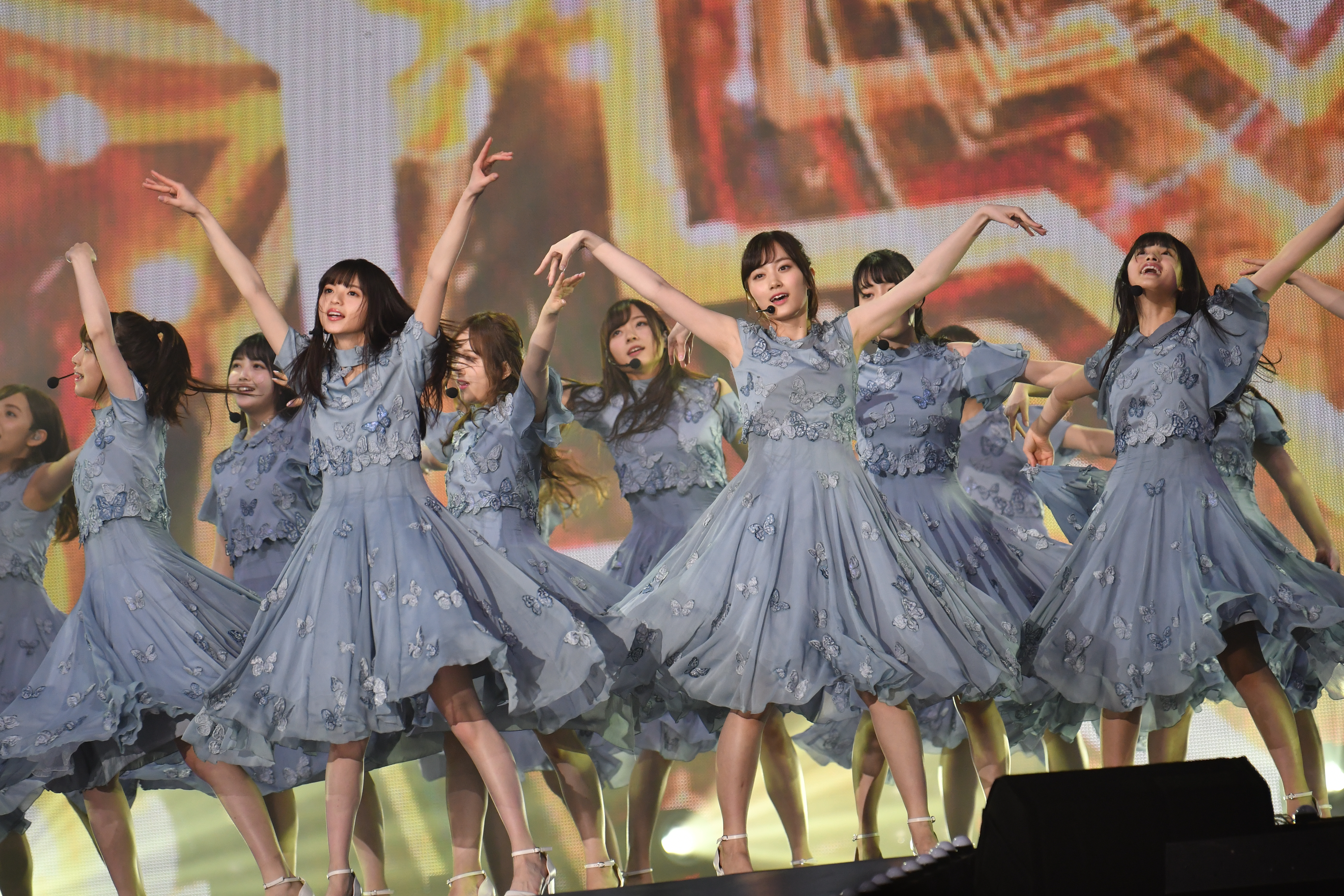
- Nogizaka46 performing in 2019
- Studio albums: 5
- Compilation albums: 2
- Singles: 42
- Video albums: 22

Japanese idol group Nogizaka46 has released forty-two singles, five studio albums, and two compilation albums, as well as numerous music videos and concert performance videos. Million-selling singles have included "Influencer" and "Synchronicity", each of which won a Japan Record Awards Grand Prix, as well as "Kaerimichi wa Tōmawari Shitaku Naru" and "Sayonara no Imi". Album releases include the studio albums Tōmei na Iro, Sorezore no Isu, Umarete kara Hajimete Mita Yume, and Ima ga Omoide ni Naru made. The group also released a compilation of "under" songs, written for members who perform at concerts but are not part of the main selection group for promoting singles, titled Boku dake no Kimi: Under Super Best. They released the 10-year-anniversary greatest hits album, titled Time Flies.

== Albums ==
=== Studio albums ===
List of studio albums, with selected chart positions, sales and certifications
Title	Details	Peak chart positions			Sales	Certifications
Title	Details	JPN	JPN Hot	KOR	Sales	Certifications
Tōmei na Iro	Released: January 7, 2015; Label: N46Div.; Formats: CD, CD+DVD, digital download, streaming	1	1	58	JPN: 331,210	RIAJ: Platinum (phy.)
Sorezore no Isu	Released: May 25, 2016; Label: N46Div.; Formats: CD, CD+DVD, digital download, streaming	1	1	56	JPN: 352,223	RIAJ: Platinum (phy.)
Umarete kara Hajimete Mita Yume	Released: May 24, 2017; Label: N46Div.; Formats: CD, CD+DVD, digital download, streaming	1	1	71	JPN: 421,315	RIAJ: Platinum (phy.)
Ima ga Omoide ni Naru made	Released: April 17, 2019; Label: N46Div.; Formats: CD, CD+Blu-ray, digital download, streaming	1	1	—	JPN: 518,444	RIAJ: 2× Platinum (phy.)
My Respect	Released: January 14, 2026; Label: N46Div.; Formats: CD, CD+Blu-ray, digital download, streaming	1	1	—	JPN: 192,512	RIAJ: Platinum (phy.)

=== Compilation albums ===
List of compilation albums, with selected chart positions, sales and certifications
Title	Details	Peak chart positions		Sales	Certifications
Title	Details	JPN	JPN Hot	Sales	Certifications
Boku dake no Kimi: Under Super Best	Released: January 10, 2018; Label: N46Div.; Formats: CD, DVD, digital download, streaming	1	1	JPN: 135,120	RIAJ: Gold (phy.)
Time Flies	Released: December 15, 2021; Label: N46Div.; Formats: CD, Blu-ray, digital download, streaming	1	1	JPN: 353,944 (phy.); JPN: 3,642 (dig.) (Note: Combined regular and New Song edition.)	RIAJ: Platinum (phy.)

== Singles ==
=== As lead artist ===
List of singles, with selected chart positions, showing year released, sales, certifications, and album name
Title	Year	Peak chart positions		Sales	Certifications	Albums
Title	Year	JPN	JPN Hot	Sales	Certifications	Albums
"Guruguru Curtain" (ぐるぐるカーテン)	2012	2	3	JPN: 214,373 (phy.)	RIAJ: Platinum (phy.)	Tōmei na Iro
"Oide Shampoo" (おいでシャンプー)	2012	1	2	JPN: 225,383 (phy.)	RIAJ: Platinum (phy.)	Tōmei na Iro
"Hashire! Bicycle" (走れ! Bicycle)	2012	1	1	JPN: 245,069 (phy.)	RIAJ: Platinum (phy.)	Tōmei na Iro
"Seifuku no Mannequin" (制服のマネキン)	2012	1	1	JPN: 313,532 (phy.)	RIAJ: Platinum (phy.); Gold (dig.)	Tōmei na Iro
"Kimi no Na wa Kibō" (君の名は希望)	2013	1	3	JPN: 319,601 (phy.)	RIAJ: Platinum (phy.); Gold (dig.)	Tōmei na Iro
"Girls' Rule" (ガールズルール)	2013	1	1	JPN: 459,512 (phy.)	RIAJ: 2× Platinum (phy.); Gold (dig.)	Tōmei na Iro
"Barrette" (バレッタ)	2013	1	1	JPN: 516,654 (phy.)	RIAJ: 2× Platinum (phy.)	Tōmei na Iro
"Kizuitara Kataomoi" (気づいたら片想い)	2014	1	1	JPN: 546,832 (phy.)	RIAJ: 2× Platinum (phy.); Gold (dig.)	Tōmei na Iro
"Natsu no Free & Easy" (夏のFree＆Easy)	2014	1	1	JPN: 526,564 (phy.)	RIAJ: 2× Platinum (phy.)	Tōmei na Iro
"Nandome no Aozora ka?" (何度目の青空か?)	2014	1	1	JPN: 619,803 (phy.)	RIAJ: 3× Platinum (phy.); Gold (dig.)	Tōmei na Iro
"Inochi wa Utsukushii" (命は美しい)	2015	1	1	JPN: 622,248 (phy.)	RIAJ: 3× Platinum (phy.)	Sorezore no Isu
"Taiyō Knock" (太陽ノック)	2015	1	1	JPN: 680,132 (phy.)	RIAJ: 3× Platinum (phy.)	Sorezore no Isu
"Ima, Hanashitai Dareka ga Iru" (今、話したい誰かがいる)	2015	1	1	JPN: 741,243 (phy.)	RIAJ: 3× Platinum (phy.)	Sorezore no Isu
"Harujion ga Sakukoro" (ハルジオンが咲く頃)	2016	1	1	JPN: 834,797 (phy.)	RIAJ: 3× Platinum (phy.)	Sorezore no Isu
"Hadashi de Summer" (裸足でSummer)	2016	1	1	JPN: 866,648 (phy.)	RIAJ: Million (phy.); Gold (dig.); Gold (st.)	Umarete kara Hajimete; Mita Yume
"Sayonara no Imi" (サヨナラの意味)	2016	1	1	JPN: 983,257 (phy.)	RIAJ: Million (phy.); Gold (dig.); Gold (st.)	Umarete kara Hajimete; Mita Yume
"Influencer" (インフルエンサー)	2017	1	1	JPN: 1,049,692 (phy.)	RIAJ: Million (phy.); Platinum (dig.); Platinum (st.)	Umarete kara Hajimete; Mita Yume
"Nigemizu" (逃げ水)	2017	1	1	JPN: 1,066,674 (phy.)	RIAJ: Million (phy.)	Ima ga Omoide ni Naru made
"Itsuka Dekiru kara Kyō Dekiru" (いつかできるから今日できる)	2017	1	1	JPN: 1,106,920 (phy.)	RIAJ: Million (phy.)	Ima ga Omoide ni Naru made
"Synchronicity" (シンクロニシティ)	2018	1	1	JPN: 1,316,229 (phy.); JPN: 47,365 (dig.)	RIAJ: Million (phy.); Gold (dig.); Platinum (st.)	Ima ga Omoide ni Naru made
"Jikochū de Ikō!" (ジコチューで行こう!)	2018	1	1	JPN: 1,329,384 (phy.); JPN: 25,326 (dig.)	RIAJ: Million (phy.)	Ima ga Omoide ni Naru made
"Kaerimichi wa Tōmawari Shitaku Naru" (帰り道は遠回りしたくなる)	2018	1	1	JPN: 1,368,732 (phy.); JPN: 43,707 (dig.)	RIAJ: Million (phy.); Gold (dig.); Platinum (st.)	Ima ga Omoide ni Naru made
"Sing Out!"	2019	1	1	JPN: 1,200,182 (phy.); JPN: 19,121 (dig.)	RIAJ: Million (phy.); Gold (st.)	Time Flies
"Yoake Made Tsuyogaranakutemoii" (夜明けまで強がらなくてもいい)	2019	1	1	JPN: 1,142,807 (phy.); JPN: 20,296 (dig.)	RIAJ: Million (phy.)	Time Flies
"Shiawase no Hogoshoku" (しあわせの保護色)	2020	1	1	JPN: 1,115,150 (phy.); JPN: 16,148 (dig.)	RIAJ: Million (phy.)	Time Flies
"Boku wa Boku o Suki ni Naru" (僕は僕を好きになる)	2021	1	1	JPN: 717,594 (phy.); JPN: 7,068 (dig.)	RIAJ: 3× Platinum (phy.)	Time Flies
"Gomen ne Fingers Crossed" (ごめんねFingers crossed)	2021	1	1	JPN: 695,372 (phy.); JPN: 9,072 (dig.)	RIAJ: 3× Platinum (phy.)	Time Flies
"Kimi ni Shikarareta" (君に叱られた)	2021	1	1	JPN: 620,113 (phy.); JPN: 10,311 (dig.)	RIAJ: 3× Platinum (phy.)	Time Flies
"Actually..."	2022	1	1	JPN: 587,172 (phy.); JPN: 3,142 (dig.)	RIAJ: 3× Platinum (phy.)	My Respect
"Suki to Iu no wa Rock da ze!" (好きというのはロックだぜ！)	2022	1	2	JPN: 678,197 (phy.); JPN: 6,863 (dig.)	RIAJ: 3× Platinum (phy.)	My Respect
"Koko ni wa Nai Mono" (ここにはないもの)	2022	1	2	JPN: 767,272 (phy.); JPN: 7,623 (dig.)	RIAJ: Million (phy.)	My Respect
"Hito wa Yume o Nido Miru" (人は夢を二度見る)	2023	1	2	JPN: 588,814 (phy.); JPN: 6,742 (dig.)	RIAJ: 3× Platinum (phy.)	My Respect
"Ohitorisama Tengoku" (おひとりさま天国)	2023	1	2	JPN: 652,252 (phy.)	RIAJ: 3× Platinum (phy.)	My Respect
"Monopoly"	2023	1	1	JPN: 538,511 (phy.)	RIAJ: 3× Platinum (phy.)	My Respect
"Chance wa Byōdō" (チャンスは平等)	2024	1	3	JPN: 587,248 (phy.)	RIAJ: 3× Platinum (phy.)	My Respect
"Cheat Day" (チートデイ)	2024	1	2	JPN: 563,122 (phy.)	RIAJ: 3× Platinum (phy.)	My Respect
"Hodōkyō" (歩道橋)	2024	1	1	JPN: 522,690 (phy.)	RIAJ: 2× Platinum (phy.)	My Respect
"Navel Orange" (ネーブルオレンジ)	2025	1	1	JPN: 541,381 (phy.)	RIAJ: 3× Platinum (phy.)	My Respect
"Same Numbers"	2025	1	1	JPN: 641,517 (phy.)	RIAJ: 3× Platinum (phy.)	My Respect
"Biryani" (ビリヤニ)	2025	1	1	JPN: 568,564 (phy.)	RIAJ: 3× Platinum (phy.)	My Respect
"Saigo ni Kaidan o Kakeagatta no wa Itsu da?" (最後に階段を駆け上がったのはいつだ?)	2026	1	1	JPN: 565,778 (phy.)	RIAJ: 3× Platinum (phy.)	TBA
"Zehi ni Oyobazu" (是非に及ばず)	2026	1	1	JPN: 509,783 (phy.)	RIAJ: 3× Platinum (phy.)	TBA
"Kimi Loss" (君ロス)	2026	TBA	25	TBA		TBA

=== Promotional singles ===
List of promotional singles, with selected chart positions, showing year released, sales, certifications, and album name
Title	Year	Peak	Sales	Certifications	Albums
Title	Year	JPN Hot	Sales	Certifications	Albums
"Boku ga Iru Basho" (僕がいる場所)	2015	45			Tōmei na Iro
"Kikkake" (きっかけ)	2016	23			Sorezore no Isu
"Daikirai na Hazu Datta" (大嫌いなはずだった。) (with HoneyWorks) (Note: As HoneyWorks Meets Sayuringo Army Corps + Manatsu-san Respect Corps from Nogizaka46)	2016	21			Non-album promotional single
"Skydiving" (スカイダイビング)	2017	12			Umarete kara Hajimete Mita Yume
"Arigachi na Ren'ai" (ありがちな恋愛)	2019	21	JPN: 7,418		Ima ga Omoide ni Naru made
"Sekaijū no Rinjin yo" (世界中の隣人よ)	2020	23	JPN: 20,471		Time Flies
"Route 246"	2020	10	JPN: 64,459	RIAJ: Gold (dig.); Gold (st.)	Time Flies
"1 2 3" (Erika Ikuta and Sayuri Matsumura as Karaage Shimai)	2021	98	JPN: 8,699		Non-album promotional single
"Saigo no Tight Hug" (最後のTight Hug)	2021	— (Note: "Saigo no Tight Hug" did not enter Billboard Japan Hot 100, but peaked at number 14 on the Download Songs.)	JPN: 5,747		Time Flies
"Bokutachi no Sayonara" (僕たちのサヨナラ)	2023	— (Note: "Bokutachi no Sayonara" did not enter Billboard Japan Hot 100, but peaked at number 12 on the Download Songs.)	JPN: 3,334		"Hito wa Yume o Nido Miru"
"Ano Hikari" (あの光)	2024	—			Non-album promotional single
"My Respect"	2026	41			My Respect
"Audition" (with Sakurazaka46 and Hinatazaka46 as Sakamichi Senbatsu)	2026	32			Non-album promotional single
"—" denotes releases that did not chart or were not released in that region.

== Guest appearances ==
List of non-single guest appearances, with selected chart positions, showing year released and album name
Title	Year	Peak	Albums
Title	Year	JPN Hot	Albums
"Twin Tail wa Mō Shinai" (ツインテールはもうしない) (with Mayu Watanabe (as Mayuzaka46))	2012	—	"Otona Jellybeans"
"Kaze no Rasen" (風の螺旋) (with Haruna Kojima (as Kojizaka46))	2014	—	"Kibōteki Refrain"
"Mazariau Mono" (混ざり合うもの) (with AKB48 (as NogizakaAKB))	2016	—	"Kimi wa Melody"
"Dare no Koto o Ichiban Aishiteru?" (誰のことを一番 愛してる?) (with AKB48 and Keyakizaka46 (as SakamichiAKB))	2017	37	"Shoot Sign" and Bokutachi wa, Ano Hi no Yoake o Shitteiru
"Kokkyo no Nai Jidai" (国境のない時代) (with AKB48 and Keyakizaka46 (as SakamichiAKB))	2018	—	"Jabaja"
"Hatsukoi Door" (初恋ドア) (with AKB48, Keyakizaka46 and Hinatazaka46 (as SakamichiAKB))	2019	—	"Jiwaru Days"
"Hitsuzensei" (必然性) (with AKB48, Keyakizaka46 and Iz*One (as IZ4648))	2019	—	"Jiwaru Days"
"Mamotte Agetai" (守ってあげたい) (with Yumi Matsutoya)	2023	— (Note: "Mamotte Agetai" did not enter Billboard Japan Hot 100, but peaked at number 97 on the Download Songs.)	Yuming Kanpai!!: Yumi Matsutoya 50th Anniversary Collaboration Best Album
"Be Together"	2024	— (Note: "Be Together" did not enter Billboard Japan Hot 100, but peaked at number 58 on the Download Songs.)	TM Network Tribute Album: 40th Celebration
"—" denotes releases that did not chart or were not released in that region.

== Other charted songs ==
List of other charted songs, with selected chart positions, showing year released, and album name
Title	Year	Peak	Certification	Albums
Title	Year	JPN Hot	Certification	Albums
"Naimononedari" (ないものねだり)	2016	41		"Sayonara no Imi"
"Hitonatsu no Nagasa yori..." (ひと夏の長さより…)	2017	75		"Nigemizu"
"Mā ii ka?" (まあいいか?)	2017	80		"Itsuka Dekiru kara Kyō Dekiru"
"Boku no Shōdō" (僕の衝動)	2017	81		"Itsuka Dekiru kara Kyō Dekiru"
"Against"	2018	45		"Synchronicity"
"Sora Tobira" (空扉)	2018	69		"Jikochū de Ikō!"
"Tsuzuku" (つづく)	2018	96		"Kaerimichi wa Tōmawari Shitaku Naru"
"Jyāne" (じゃあね。)	2020	81		"Shiawase no Hogoshoku"
"I See..."	2020	30	RIAJ: Gold (st.)	"Shiawase no Hogoshoku"

== Videography ==
=== Video albums ===
List of video albums, with selected chart positions, sales and certifications
Title	Details	Peak chart position		Certifications
Title	Details	JPN DVD	JPN BD	Certifications
1st Year Birthday Live 2013.2.22 Makuhari Messe	Released: DVD: February 5, 2014; Blu-ray: February 26, 2014; Label: N46Div.; Format: DVD, Blu-ray	1	3	
2nd Year Birthday Live, 2014.2.22 Yokohama Arena	Released : June 17, 2015; Label : N46Div.; Format : DVD, Blu-ray	2	1	
All MV Collection: Ano Toki no Kanojotachi	Released: December 23, 2015; Label: N46Div.; Format: DVD, Blu-ray	2	1	RIAJ: Gold
3rd Year Birthday Live, 2015.2.22 Seibu Dome	Released: July 6, 2016; Label: N46Div.; Format: DVD, Blu-ray	4	2	
4th Year Birthday Live, 2016.8.28-30 Jingu Stadium	Released: June 28, 2017; Label: N46Div.; Format: DVD, Blu-ray	2	1	RIAJ: Gold
5th Year Birthday Live, 2017.2.20-22 Saitama Super Arena	Released: March 28, 2018; Label: N46Div.; Format: DVD, Blu-ray	2	1	RIAJ: Gold
Summer National Tour 2017 Final! in Tokyo Dome	Released: July 11, 2018; Label: N46Div.; Format: DVD, Blu-ray	2	1	RIAJ: Gold
6th Year Birthday Live	Released: July 3, 2019; Label: N46Div.; Format: DVD, Blu-ray	1	2	
7th Year Birthday Live	Released: February 5, 2020; Label: N46Div.; Format: DVD, Blu-ray	4	2	RIAJ: Gold
All MV Collection 2: Ano Toki no Kanojotachi	Released: September 9, 2020; Label: N46Div.; Format: DVD, Blu-ray	1	1	RIAJ: Gold
8th Year Birthday Live 2020.2.21~2.24 Nagoya Dome	Released: December 23, 2020; Label: N46Div.; Format: DVD, Blu-ray	1	1	
Mai Shiraishi Graduation Concert: Always Beside You	Released: March 10, 2021; Label: N46Div.; Format: DVD, Blu-ray	1	1	
9th Year Birthday Live Day1 All Members	Released: June 8, 2022; Label: N46Div.; Format: DVD, Blu-ray	11	13	
9th Year Birthday Live Day2 2nd Members	Released: June 8, 2022; Label: N46Div.; Format: DVD, Blu-ray	39	26	
9th Year Birthday Live Day3 4th Members	Released: June 8, 2022; Label: N46Div.; Format: DVD, Blu-ray	22	19	
9th Year Birthday Live Day4 4th Members	Released: June 8, 2022; Label: N46Div.; Format: DVD, Blu-ray	20	23	
9th Year Birthday Live Day5 3rd Members	Released: June 8, 2022; Label: N46Div.; Format: DVD, Blu-ray	17	16	
9th Year Birthday Live 5Days	Released: June 8, 2022; Label: N46Div.; Format: DVD, Blu-ray	3	1	
Summer National Tour 2021 Final! in Tokyo Dome	Released: November 16, 2022; Label: N46Div.; Format: DVD, Blu-ray	2	1	
10th Year Birthday Live	Released: February 22, 2023; Label: N46Div.; Format: DVD, Blu-ray	2	1	
Nogizaka46 Asuka Saito Graduation Concert	Released: October 25, 2023; Label: N46Div.; Format: DVD, Blu-ray	1	1	
11th Year Birthday Live 5 Days	Released: February 21, 2024; Label: N46Div.; Format: DVD, Blu-ray	2	2	
