= Misa Etō =

Japanese garvure model (born 1993)

- 衛藤 美彩
- Born: 4 January 1993 (age 33); Ōita, Ōita, Japan
- Other names: Misamisa (みさみさ); Misa-senpai (みさ先輩)
- Occupation: Gravure model
- Years active: 2008–present
- Agent: Twin Planet
- Spouse: Sōsuke Genda (m. 2019)
- Children: 3
- Awards: Miss Magazine 2011 Grand Prix
- Musical career
- Genres: J-pop
- Label: Sony Records/N46Div
- Formerly of: Chimo; Nogizaka46

Misa Etō (衛藤 美彩, Etō Misa; born 4 January 1993) is a Japanese gravure model. Former member of the idol groups Nogizaka46 and Chimo. On February 14, 2019, Etō announced that she would be graduating from Nogizaka46, that her graduation concert would be held at Ryōgoku Kokugikan the following month, and that her official group activities would conclude at the end of March. In April 2019, she became a regular co-host for the CS Fuji TV ONE Professional Baseball News 2019 program.

== Personal life ==
Eto married professional baseball player Sosuke Genda in October 2019. They have three children: a son born in January 2022, a daughter born in December 2023, and a second son born in August 2026.

== Discography ==
=== Singles ===
==== Chimo ====
Year	Title
2009	"We Are Chimo Yeah!!"
2010	"Seishun Survivor"
2012	"Koi no Doki-gaku Setsumeisho" / "1009% Chimode"
2012	"Na Chu"

==== Nogizaka46 ====
Year	No.	Title	Role	Notes
2012	1	"Guruguru Curtain"	B-side	Debut as 1st Generation member; Do not sing on title track. Sang on "Nogizaka no Uta", "Aitakatta Kamoshirenai" and "Hidari Mune no Yūki" as Under Member
2012	2	"Oide Shampoo"	B-side	Do not sing on title track. Sang on "Ōkami ni Kuchibue o" as Under Member and "House!"
2012	3	"Hashire! Bicycle"	B-side	Do not sing on title track. Sang on "Namida ga Mada Kanashimi Datta Koro" as Under Member and "Oto ga Denai Guitar"
2012	4	"Seifuku no Mannequin"	B-side	Do not sing on title track. Sang on "Haru no Melody" as Under Member
2013	5	"Kimi no Na wa Kibō"	B-side	Do not sing on title track. Sang on "Shakiism" and "13nichi no Kinyobi" as Under Member
2013	6	"Girl's Rule"	B-side	Do not sing on title track. Sang on "Senpūki" as Under Member and "Ningen to Iu Gakki"
2013	7	"Barrette"	A-side	Also sang on "Tsuki no Ōkisa", "Watashi no Tame ni, Dareka no Tame ni" and "Sonna Baka na…"
2014	8	"Kizuitara Kataomoi"	B-side	Do not sing on title track. Sang on "Umareta Mama de" as Under Member
2014	9	"Natsu no Free & Easy"	A-side	Also sang on "Nani mo Dekizu ni Soba ni Iru" and "Sono Saki no Deguchi"
2014	10	"Nandome no Aozora ka?"	A-side	Also sang on "Korogatta Kane o Narase!"
2015	11	"Inochi wa Utsukushii"	A-side	Also sang on "Tachinaorichū"
2015	12	"Taiyō Nokku"	A-side	Also sang on "Hane no Kioku"
2015	13	"Ima, Hanashitai Dareka ga Iru"	A-side	Also sang on "Popipappapā" and "Kanashimi no Wasurekata"
2016	14	"Harujion ga Sakukoro"	A-side	Also sang on "Harukanaru Bhutan"
2016	15	"Hadashi de Summer"	A-side	Also sang on "Boku Dake no Hikari"
2016	16	"Sayonara no Imi"	A-side	Also sang on "Kodoku na Aozora"
2017	17	"Influencer"	A-side	Also sang on "Igai BREAK"
2017	18	"Nigemizu"	A-side	Also sang on "Onna wa Hitori ja Nemurenai", "Hito Natsu no Nagasa Yori…" and "Naitatte Iijanaika?"
2017	19	"Itsuka Dekiru kara Kyō Dekiru"	A-side	Also sang on "Fuminshō"
2018	20	"Synchronicity"	A-side	Also sang on "Against" as 1st Generation member and "Kumo ni Nareba ii"
2018	21	"Jikochū de Ikō!"	A-side	Also sang on "Anna ni Sukidatta no ni…"
2018	22	"Kaerimichi wa Tōmawari Shitaku Naru"	A-side	Last single to participate
2020	—	"Sekaijū no Rinjin yo"	—	Charity song during the COVID-19 pandemic

=== Albums ===
==== Chimo ====
Year	Title
2011	Watashi-tachi, Chi modesu

==== Nogizaka46 ====
Year	No.	Title	Participated song
2015	1	Tōmei na Iro	"Boku ga Iru Basho"; "Dareka wa Mikata"
2016	2	Sorezore no Isu	"Kikkake"; "Taiyō ni Kudokarete"; "Kūkikan"
2017	3	Umarete Kara Hajimete Mita Yume	"Skydiving"; "Settei Ondo"; "Minikui Watashi"
2019	4	Ima ga Omoide ni Naru made	"Moshi Kimi ga Inakereba" (graduation song)

== Filmography ==
=== Films ===
Year	Title	Role	Director	Notes	Ref(s)
2020	Silent Rain	Koyomi	Ryūtarō Nakagawa	Lead role	
2020	Mio's Cookbook	Kikuno	Haruki Kadokawa		

=== Television ===
Year	Title	Role	Network	Ref.
2011	Motto Atsui zo! Nekoketani! !	Hiromi Saionji	NBN	
2011	Nemurenu Machi no Aprince	Herself	Nippon TV	
2011	Pigoo Radio	Herself	Pigoo HD, Enta! 371	
2011	Kaiun On Gakudō	Herself	TBS	
2012	Neko-ben: Shitai no Minoshirokin	Hiromi Arita	TBS	
2012	Nogizaka Romance	Herself	TV Tokyo	
2013	Utsukushī Hito ni Okora retai		TV Tokyo	
2014	NogiBingo!	Herself	Nippon TV	
2015	Hatsumori Bemars	Shelly	TV Tokyo	

=== Theater ===
Year	Title	Role	Ref.
2014	Mr. Kaminari	Nanane Utsuki	

=== Radio ===
Year	Title	Network	Ref.
2010	Galactica Goldenball	FM Fuji	
2015	Kin tsubu	Bay FM	

=== Advertising ===
Year	Product	Ref.
2012	Weekly Shōnen Magazine	

=== Video games ===
Year	Title	Role	Notes	Ref.
2017	Q&Q Answers	Herself	Voice role	

=== Internet ===
Year	Title	Website	Ref.
2014	Yakyū Daisuki Atsumare! Samurai Japan	Rakuten Showtime	
2017	Nogizaka 46 Misa Etō Shashin-shū 'Hanashi o kikou ka.' Hatsubai Kinen SP	Showroom	

== Bibliography ==
=== Photo albums ===
Year	Title	Ref.
2009	Chimo Shashin-shū II Gakkō Renai Tokidoki Chimo	
2012	Aya -Irodori-	
2012	Virgin Virgin	
2014	Kikan Nogizaka vol.2 Shoka	
2017	Hanashi o Kikou ka.	

=== Magazine appearances ===
Year	Magazine	Ref.
2011	Weekly Young Magazine	
2011	Weekly Shonen Magazine	

=== Manga ===
Year	Title	Ref.
2015	Nogizaka46 × Weekly Playboy 2015 "Misa-senpai+"	

=== Novels ===
Year	Title	Ref.
2016	Naze Kanojo ga Chōbo no Migi ni Uriage to Kaitara Sekai ga Kawatta no ka?	
