= Nagi Inoue =

Japanese singer, actress and model (born 2005)

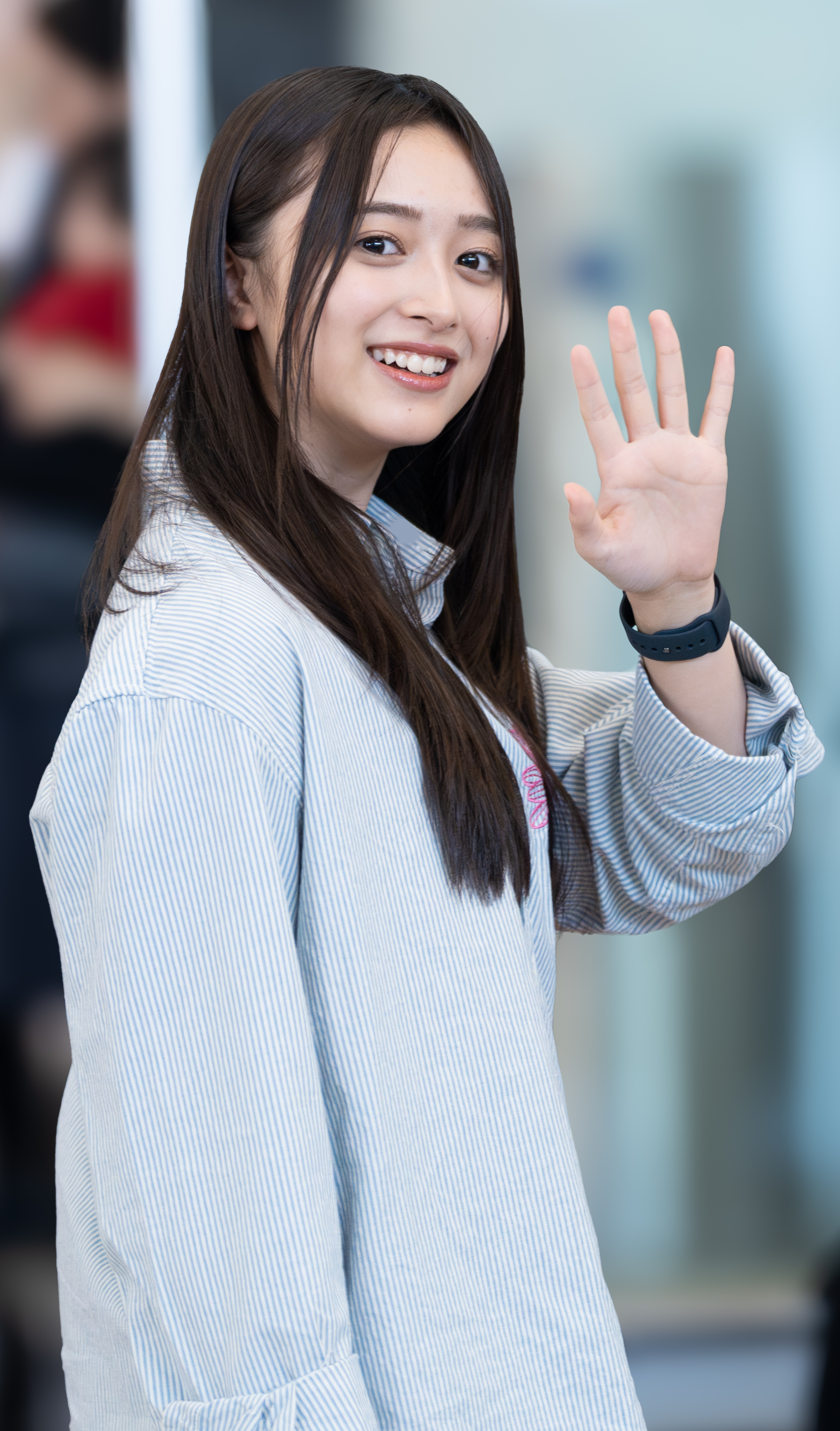
- Inoue in 2024
- Born: February 17, 2005 (age 21); Hiratsuka, Kanagawa Prefecture, Japan
- Other name: Nyagi
- Occupations: Singer; actress; model
- Years active: 2010–2013; 2022–present
- Agent: Nogizaka46.LLC
- Height: 158 cm (5 ft 2 in)
- Musical career
- Genre: J-pop
- Instrument: Vocals
- Years active: 2022–present
- Label: Sony
- Member of: Nogizaka46

Japanese name
- Kanji: 井上 和
- Hiragana: いのうえ なぎ
Transcriptions
- Romanization: Inoue Nagi

Signature
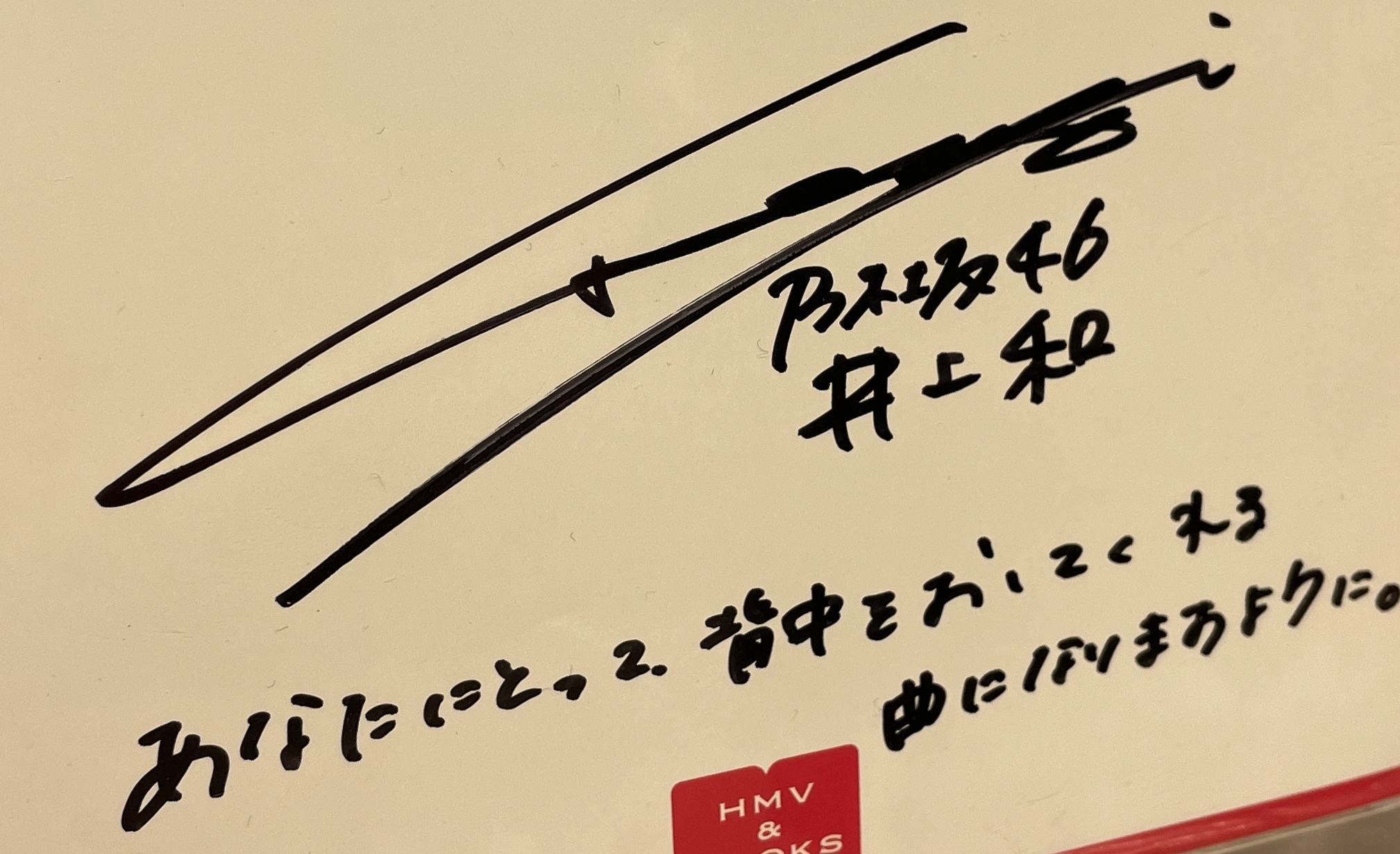

Nagi Inoue (Japanese: 井上 和, romanized: Inoue Nagi; born February 17, 2005) is a Japanese singer, actress and model. She is a fifth-generation member of the idol girl group Nogizaka46. She is also signed as an exclusive model for the women's fashion magazine Non-no.

== Early life and career ==
Inoue was born on February 17, 2005 in Hiratsuka City, Kanagawa Prefecture. Her family consists of her mother, father, and two younger brothers.

Before joining Nogizaka46, Inoue was a former child actress under the juniors category of the talent agency Amuse.

On February 1, 2022, Inoue passed the audition for the fifth generation members of Nogizaka46. Though her mother was initially opposed to her trying out for the girl group due to concerns, she was eventually convinced and chose to support her. On February 23, she and fellow new generation members appeared in their first live performance as an introduction for the "Nogizaka46 5th Generation Introduction Meeting" held at the Makuhari Messe convention center and had a double-centered position for "Influencer" with Aruno Nakanishi. Later that year, Inoue became the center for the fifth generation's first song "Zetsubou no Ichibō Mae", which is included in the 29th single "Actually..." released on March 23.

In 2023, she was selected for the first time to perform live in the 32nd single "Hito wa Yume o Nido Miru" released in March 29, and was chosen for the first time as the center for the title song of the 33rd single "Ohitorisama Tengoku" released on August 23. On December 31 of the same year, she participated in the 74th NHK Kōhaku Uta Gassen at NHK hall as a singer.

In an interview with Non-no magazine, Inoue described senior member Sakura Endo as the member she admires as a feminine 'ideal' whom she aspires to be like.

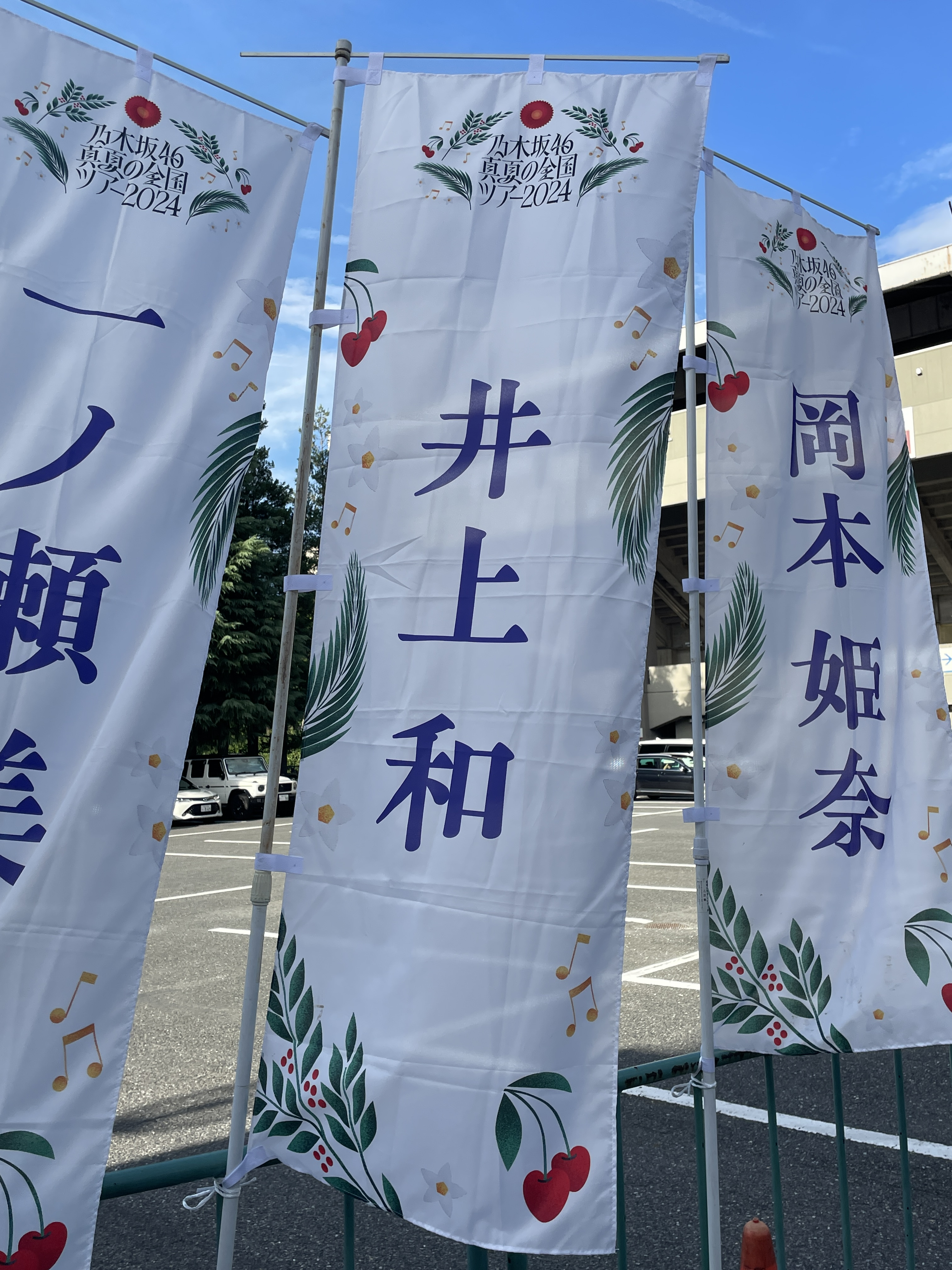
Inoue's flag at Nogizaka46's Summer National Tour in 2024

In January 2024, she became a regular host on the radio program School of Lock! by TOKYO FM in the segment Nogizaka LOCKS!. From April 12 to 29, Inoue played the character Sailor Moon/Tsukino Usagi in the "Nogizaka46 5th Generation Musical Pretty Guardian Sailor Moon 2024". Also on April 12, it was announced that she had become an exclusive model for the women's fashion magazine Non-no and started appearing in its June issue, which was released on April 19. A month later, on May 3, Inoue made her runway debut at the "Rakuten GirlsAward 2024 Spring/Summer" fashion show held at Yoyogi National Gymnasium. On August 21 of the same year, she was the center for the second time in three singles on the 36th single, "Cheat Day."

On February 5, 2025, it was announced that Inoue would be performing her first solo as a live act at the MTV Video Music Awards Japan, which was held in the K-Arena Yokohama on March 19. On March 21, she starred in her first television drama, Spring! in TV Asahi. Then on March 26, she made the double center position with Nakanishi Aruno in the 38th single, "Navel Orange."

On April 22 of the same year, she released her first photo book entitled "Monologue", with photos taken across Sardinia, Italy, and historical sites in Rome. The 256-page book is the largest in the history of Nogizaka46 solo photobooks, roughly twice the length of a regular photobook. The initial print run of 200,000 copies is also the largest for a member's first solo photobook. The recorded weekly sales were 92,000 copies, ranking first in the Oricon Weekly Book Ranking and the photobook category. It also ranked first in the photobook and talent book categories of the first half of 2025 Oricon Book Rankings, with sales of 112,000 copies during that period.

Inoue was revealed to have been cast as Lady Chacha in the taiga drama, Brothers in Arms in April 2025; having been chosen from an audition with over 1,600 participants. It is scheduled to air in 2026.

Inoue at the 39th Tokyo International Film Festival in 2026

On March 10, 2026, she was appointed as the new chairperson of the Tokyo Idol Festival, succeeding actress and tarento Neru Nagahama. On May 30, animation studio CloverWorks revealed that Inoue and several other Nogizaka46 members have been cast as voice actors in its upcoming animated film Grotesqqque. Disney Japan released the voice cast list for the dubbed version of the American animated film Toy Story 5 on June 18, 2026; later that same day, Inoue announced through an Instagram post that she had been cast as one of its voice actresses.

== Filmography ==
=== Film ===
Year	Title	Role	Notes	Ref.
2026	Grotesqqque	Ayame (voice)	Animated film	
2026	Toy Story 5	Snappy (voice)	Japanese dub	

=== Television ===
Year	Title	Role	Notes	Ref.
2023	The Blacked-Out Score and the Transfer Student	Asuka	Lead role; short web drama	
2024–25	The Mysterious Candy Shop Zeni-tendo	Nyagi, maid, Tsugumu (voice)	TV anime; episodes 112, 124, 134 and 141–148	
2025	Spring!	Aoi Osaka	Lead role; miniseries	
2026	Brothers in Arms	Lady Chacha	Taiga drama	
2026	The Neighbor	Rina Tayama	Lead role; anthology series	

== Stage ==
=== Theater ===
Year	Title	Role	Notes	Ref.
2024	Pretty Guardian Sailor Moon	Usagi Tsukino	Lead role	
2026–28	Spirited Away stage	Chihiro Ogino	Lead role	

== Bibliography ==
=== Magazine ===
- Non-no (April 19, 2024, Shueisha) – Exclusive model

=== Photobook ===
- "Monologue" (April 22, 2025, Kodansha)
