= Miona Hori =

Japanese actress and YouTuber (born 1996)

- 堀 未央奈
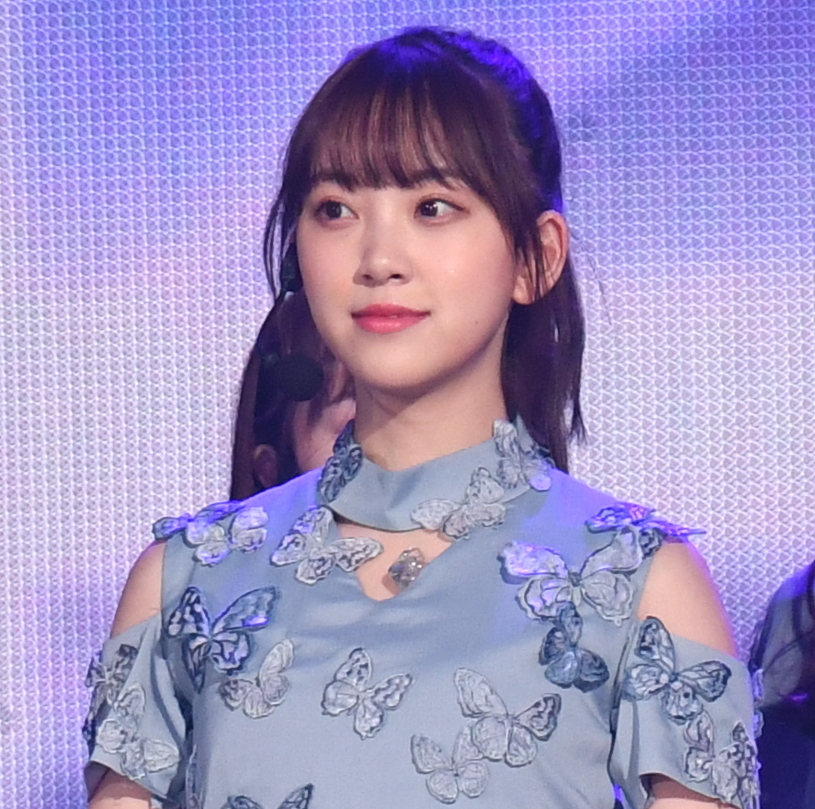
- Miona in 2019
- Born: October 15, 1996 (age 29); Gifu, Gifu Prefecture, Japan
- Occupations: Actress; YouTuber
- Years active: 2013–present
- Notable work: Hot Gimmick: Girl Meets Boy (2019)
- Musical career
- Genre: J-pop
- Years active: 2013–2021
- Label: Sony Records/N46Div
- Formerly of: Nogizaka46
- Website: hori-miona.com

Miona Hori (堀 未央奈, Hori Miona; born October 15, 1996), is a Japanese actress and YouTuber. She is a former second generation member of the idol girl group Nogizaka46, and a regular model for the fashion magazine ar.

== Life and career ==
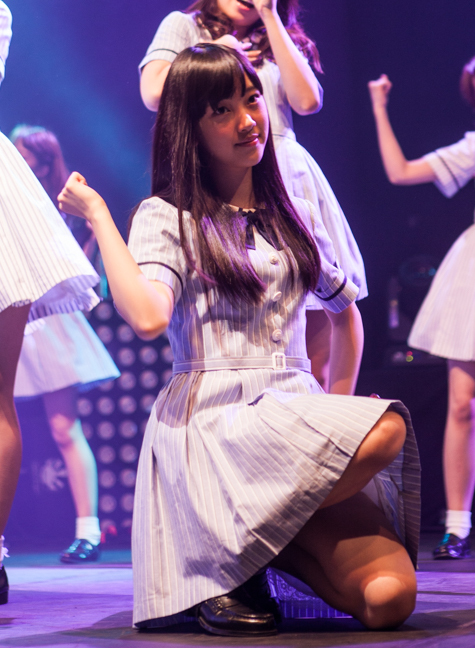
Hori at the 2014 Japan Expo

On March 28, 2013, Hori successfully auditioned for the second generation of Nogizaka46, debuting in the theater play 16-nin no Principal Deux, which showcased the newly added second generation members. Hori was chosen as the center for the group's seventh single "Barrette" and has been a core member of the group since. She continues to be active as an idol and on various television programs.

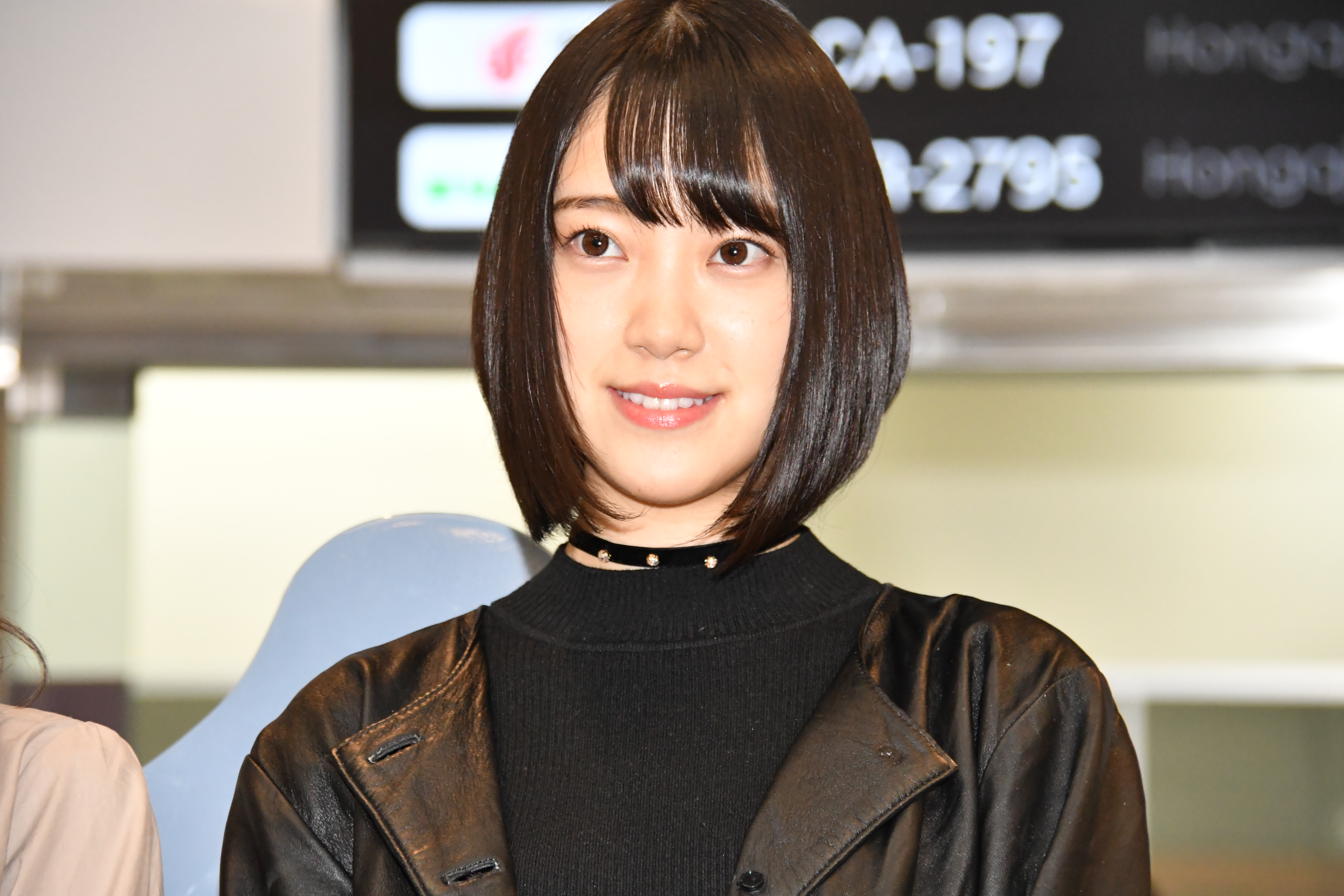
Hori in Taiwan for the Asia Fashion Award (AFA) in 2018

In 2019, Hori debuted as a film actress in a leading role in the film Hot Gimmick: Girl Meets Boy, an adaptation of Miki Aihara's manga Hot Gimmick, playing the role of Hatsumi Narita. Her performance won the Asian New Talent Award - Best Actress category at the Shanghai International Film Festival that year.

On November 27, 2020, Hori released her solo song "Tsumetai Mizu no Naka" (冷たい水の中), and announced her graduation.

== Discography ==
=== Singles with Nogizaka46 ===
Year	No.	Title	Role	Notes
2013	7	"Barrette"	A-side, center	First single to participate; Also sang on "Tsuki no Ōkisa" and "Sonna Baka na…"
2014	8	"Kizuitara Kataomoi"	A-side	Also sang on "Romance no Start", "Toiki no Method" and "Dankeschön"
2014	9	"Natsu no Free & Easy"	A-side	Also sang on "Nani mo Dekizu ni Soba ni Iru" and "Mukuchi na Lion"
2014	10	"Nandome no Aozora ka?"	A-side	Also sang on "Korogatta Kane o Narase!" and "Watashi, Okiru"
2015	11	"Inochi wa Utsukushii"	A-side	Also sang on "Arakajime Katarareru Romance"
2015	12	"Taiyō Nokku"	B-side	Do not sing on title track. Sang on "Wakaregiwa, Motto Suki ni Naru" as Under Member
2015	13	"Ima, Hanashitai Dareka ga Iru"	B-side	Do not sing on title track. Sang on "Shitto no Kenri" as Under Member and "Otona e no Chikamichi"
2016	14	"Harujion ga Sakukoro"	A-side	Also sang on "Harukanaru Bhutan"
2016	15	"Hadashi de Summer"	A-side	Also sang on "Boku Dake no Hikari"
2016	16	"Sayonara no Imi"	A-side	Also sang on "Kodoku na Aozora", "Ano Kyōshitsu" and "Kimi ni Okuru Hana ga Nai"
2017	17	"Influencer"	A-side	Also sang on "Atarisawari no Nai Hanashi"
2017	18	"Nigemizu"	A-side	Also sang on "Onna wa Hitori ja Nemurenai", "Hito Natsu no Nagasa Yori…", "Live Kami" as 2nd Generation member and "Naitatte Iijanaika?"
2017	19	"Itsuka Dekiru kara Kyō Dekiru"	A-side	Also sang on "Fuminshō"
2018	20	"Synchronicity"	A-side	Also sang on "Scoutman" as 2nd Generation member
2018	21	"Jikochū de Ikō!"	A-side	Also sang on "Anna ni Sukidatta no ni…"
2018	22	"Kaerimichi wa Tōmawari Shitaku Naru"	A-side	Also sang on "Caravan wa Nemuranai"
2019	23	"Sing Out!"	A-side	Also sang on "Am I Loving"
2019	24	"Yoake Made Tsuyogaranakutemoii"	A-side	Also sang on "Boku no Koto, Shitteru?", "Romendensha no Machi" and "Boku no Omoikomi"
2020	25	"Shiawase no Hogoshoku"	A-side	Also sang on "Anastasia" as 2nd Generation member
2020	—	"Sekaijū no Rinjin yo"	—	Charity song during the COVID-19 pandemic
2020	—	"Route 246"	—	
2021	26	"Boku wa Boku o Suki ni Naru"	A-side	Last single to participate; Also sang on "Ashita ga Aru Riyū", "Wilderness World" and "Tsumetai Mizu no Naka" which was her graduation song.

=== Albums with Nogizaka46 ===
Year	No.	Title	Participated song
2015	1	Tōmei na Iro	"Boku ga Iru Basho"; "Nazo no Rakugaki"
2016	2	Sorezore no Isu	"Kikkake"; "Taiyō ni Kudokarete"; "Threefold Choice"; "Kakikōri no Kataomoi"
2017	3	Umarete Kara Hajimete Mita Yume	"Skydiving"; "Settei Ondo"; "Watabokori"
2019	4	Ima ga Omoide ni Naru made	"Arigachi na Ren'ai"; "Gorgonzola"

=== Other featured songs ===
Year	Artist	Title	Albums / Singles
2017	AKB48	"Dare no Koto o Ichiban Aishiteru"	"Shoot Sign"
2018	AKB48	"Kokkyo no Nai Jidai"	"Jabaja"
2019	AKB48	"Hitsuzensei"	"Jiwaru Days"

== Filmography ==
=== Films ===
Year	Title	Role	Notes	Ref.
2019	Hot Gimmick: Girl Meets Boy	Hatsumi Narita	Lead role	
2025	Suicide Notes Laid on the Table	Tsubaki Himeyama		
2025	The Man Who Failed to Die	Nozomi Takeshita		
2027	The Gate of Murder	Rieko Teraoka		

=== Television ===
Year	Title	Role	Notes	Ref.
2022	Fishbowl Wives			
2022	Accomplishment of Fudanshi Bartender	Yuri Hokuto		

=== Theater ===
Year	Title	Role	Notes	Ref.
2015	Joshiraku	Gankyō Kurubiyutei		
2017	Asahinagu	Nene Ichidō		
