= Yūki Yoda =

Japanese actress and model (born 2000)

- 与田 祐希
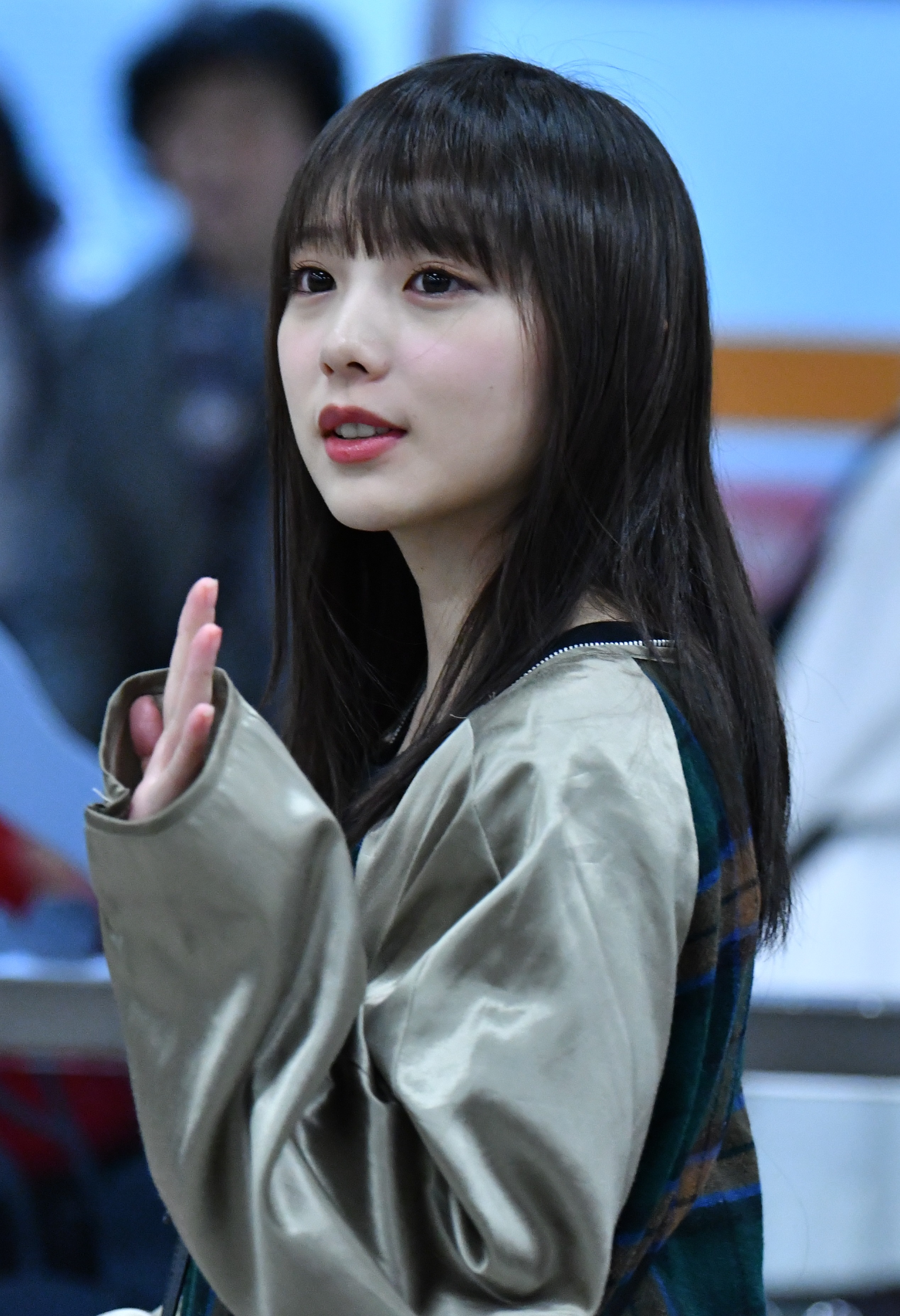
- Yoda in 2019
- Born: May 5, 2000 (age 26); Fukuoka Prefecture, Japan
- Other name: Yoda-chan (よだちゃん)
- Occupations: Actress; model
- Agent: Nogizaka46.LLC
- Musical career
- Genre: J-pop
- Instruments: Vocals; guitar
- Years active: 2016–2025
- Label: Sony Records/N46Div
- Formerly of: Nogizaka46

Signature
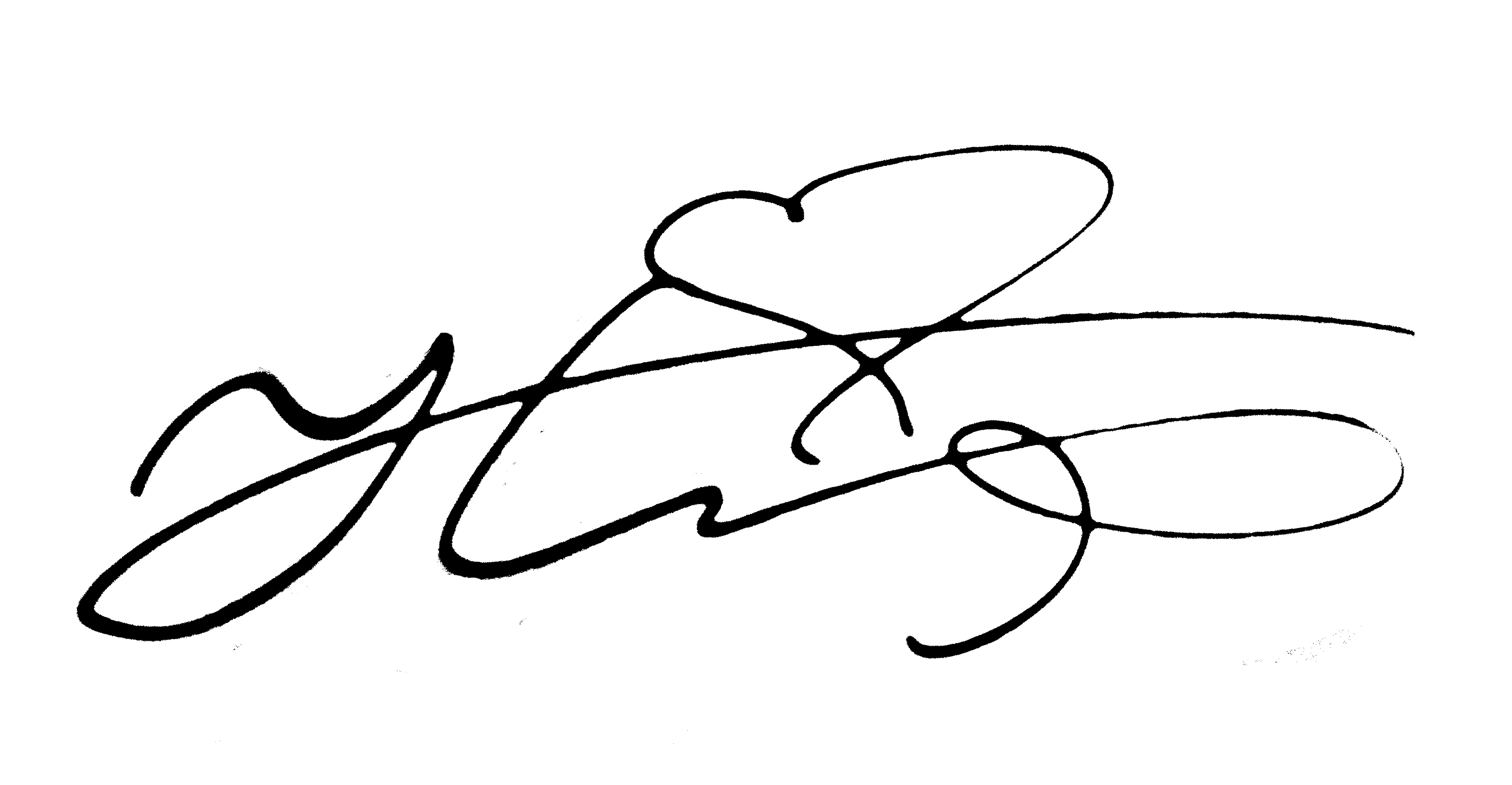

Yūki Yoda (与田 祐希, Yoda Yūki; born May 5, 2000), is a Japanese actress and model. She is a former third generation member of the idol girl group Nogizaka46 and an exclusive model for the magazines MAQUIA and bis. She has played supporting roles in the television dramas Mob Psycho 100 and Zambi.

== Early life and career ==
Yūki Yoda was born on May 5, 2000, in Shika Island, Fukuoka Prefecture. She has one younger brother.

Her entertainment career began in 2016 when she successfully auditioned for the third generation of the idol group Nogizaka46. Yoda and her fellow third generation members performed their first full live concert in May 2017. Her first selection for Nogizaka46's main performance group came in August 2017, when she was selected for Nogizaka46's 18th single "Nigemizu". She has also been selected to appear in advertising campaigns for Mouse Computer and 7-Eleven.

In December 2017, Yoda released her first photobook titled "Hinata no Ondo", which became the bestselling photobook in Japan that week, and the tenth bestselling photobook in 2018 with 66,314 sold. She later became an exclusive model for the fashion magazines MAQUIA and bis.

Yoda's first acting role came in 2018 with the TV Tokyo adaptation of the webcomic Mob Psycho 100. A stage role in the horror play Zambi followed, with Yoda joining the cast alongside several members of Nogizaka46 and Keyakizaka46. Yoda reprised her role for the 2019 Nippon TV adaptation of Zambi. She played the lead role of Chisa Kotegawa in the 2020 live-action adaptation of the manga Grand Blue.

In March 2020, Yoda released her second photobook titled "Mukuchi na Jikan". In February 2025, Yoda released her third photobook entitled "Yōda".

On January 5, 2025, Yoda announced her "graduation" from Nogizaka46. Her first solo selection for Nogizaka46's main performance group came on February 3, 2025, when she was selected for Nogizaka46's digital download single "Natsukashisa no Saki". Her first selection for Nogizaka46's solo performance came on February 23, 2025, when she was selected for Nogizaka46's digital download single "100 Nichi Me". Her graduation concert took place on February 22–23, 2025, at the Mizuho PayPay Dome Fukuoka, attended by 77 thousand people.

== Discography ==
=== Singles with Nogizaka46 ===
Year	No.	Title	Role	Notes
2017	17	"Influencer"	B-side	First single to participate; Did not sing on title track. Sang on "Sanbanme no Kaze" as 3rd Generation.
2017	18	"Nigemizu"	A-side, center	Shared center position with Momoko Ōzono; Also sang on "Onna wa Hitori ja Nemurenai", "Hito Natsu no Nagasa Yori…", "Mirai no Kotae" as 3rd Generation and "Naitatte Iijanaika?"
2017	19	"Itsuka Dekiru kara Kyō Dekiru"	B-side	Did not sing on title track. Sang on "Fuminshō" and "Boku no Shōdō" as 3rd Generation
2018	20	"Synchronicity"	A-side	Also sang on "Tokitokimekimeki" as 3rd Generation and "Kotodamaho"
2018	21	"Jikochū de Ikō!"	A-side	Also sang on "Soratobira", "Jibun janai Kanji" as 3rd Generation, "Chikyū ga Maruinara" and "Anna ni Sukidatta no ni…"
2018	22	"Kaerimichi wa Tōmawari Shitaku Naru"	A-side	Also sang on "Caravan wa Nemuranai" and "Shiritai Koto"
2019	23	"Sing Out!"	A-side	Also sang on "Heikōsen"
2019	24	"Yoake Made Tsuyogaranakutemoii"	A-side	Also sang on "Boku no Koto, Shitteru?" and "Boku no Omoikomi"
2020	25	"Shiawase no Hogoshoku"	A-side	Also sang on "Sayonara Stay With Me" and "Mainichi ga Brand New Day" as 3rd Generation
2020	—	"Sekaijū no Rinjin yo"	—	Charity song during the COVID-19 pandemic
2020	—	"Route 246"	—	
2021	26	"Boku wa Boku o Suki ni Naru"	A-side	Also sang on "Ashita ga Aru Riyū" and "Wilderness World"
2021	27	"Gomen ne Fingers Crossed"	A-side	Also sang on "Zenbu Yume no Mama" as center, "Otonatachi ni wa Shiji Sarenai" as 3rd Generation, and "Zabun Zazabun"
2021	28	“Kimi ni Shikarareta”	A-side	Also sang on “Tanin no Sora ni”
2022	29	“Actually…”	A-side	Also sang on “Fukayomi” and “Suki ni Natte Mita”
2022	30	“Suki to Iu no wa Rock da ze!”	A-side	Also sang on Boku ga Te wo Tataku Hou e” and Passionfruits no Tabekata”
2022	31	“Koko ni wa Nai Mono”	A-side	Also sang on “Sentou Rhapsody”
2023	32	“Hito wa Yume wo Nido Miru”	A-side	Also sang on “Bokutachi no Sayonara”
2023	33	“Ohitorisama Tengoku”	A-side	Also sang on “Dareka no Kata”
2023	34	“Monopoly”	A-side	Also sang on “Tegone Hamburg”
2024	35	“Chance wa Byoudou”	A-side	—
2024	36	“Cheat Day”	A-side	—
2024	37	"Hodōkyō"	A-side	Also sang on “Nogizakamanjū” and “Yuki ga Furuhi ni Mata Aô”
2025	—	"Natsukashisa no Saki"	center	Nogizaka46's 38th single "Navel Orange" tracklist.
2025	—	"100 Nichi Me"	Solo	Nogizaka46's 38th single "Navel Orange" tracklist.

=== Albums with Nogizaka46 ===
Year	No.	Title	Participated song
2017	3	Umarete Kara Hajimete Mita Yume	"Omoide First"; "Settei Ondo"
2019	4	Ima ga Omoide ni Naru made	"Arigachi na Ren'ai; "Mōsugu ~Zambi Densetsu~"

=== Other featured songs ===
Year	Artist	Title	Albums / Singles
2018	AKB48	"Kokkyo no Nai Jidai"	"Jabaja"
2019	AKB48	"Hatsukoi Door"	"Jiwaru Days"

== Filmography ==
=== Film ===
Year	Title	Role	Notes	Ref(s)
2020	Grand Blue	Chisa Kotegawa		
2023	Out	Chihiro Minagawa		
2026	In the Clear Moonlit Dusk	Yoshiko		
2027	Gacha	Rinko Amano	Lead role	

=== Television ===
Year	Title	Role	Notes	Ref(s)
2018	Mob Psycho 100	Tsubomi Takane		
2019	Zambi	Kai Hijir		
2021	Japan Sinks: People of Hope	Ai Yamada		
2022–24	Ryosangata Riko	Riko Komukai	Lead role; 3 seasons	

=== Theater ===
Year	Title	Role	Ref(s)
2018	Zambi	Kai Hijiri	

== Bibliography ==
=== Photobooks ===
- Hinata no Ondo (日向の温度) (December 26, 2017, Gentosha), ISBN 9784344031586
- Mukuchi na Jikan (無口な時間) (March 10, 2020, Kobunsha), ISBN 9784334902513
- Yōda (ヨーダ) (February 12, 2025, Kobunsha), ISBN 9784334902513
