= List of Hot 100 number-one singles of 2018 (Japan) =

The following is a list of number-one singles on the Billboard Japan Hot 100 chart in 2018.

== Chart history ==
Issue date	Song	Artist(s)	Ref.
January 1	"White Love"	Hey! Say! JUMP	
January 8	"Warota People"	NMB48	
January 15	"Hero"	Namie Amuro	
January 22	"Muishiki no Iro"	SKE48	
January 29	"LPS"	NEWS	
February 5	"Topaz Love"	KinKi Kids	
February 12	"Kurayami"	STU48	
February 19	"Candy Pop"	Twice	
February 26	"Mae o Muke"	Hey! Say! JUMP	
March 5	"Find the Answer"	Arashi	
March 12	"Doraemon"	Gen Hoshino	
March 19	"Glass o Ware!"	Keyakizaka46	
March 26	"Jabaja"	AKB48	
April 2	"Lemon"	Kenshi Yonezu	
April 9	"Lemon"	Kenshi Yonezu	
April 16	"Yokubomono"	NMB48	
April 23	"Haru wa Doko kara Kuru no ka?"	NGT48	
April 30	"Ask Yourself"	KAT-TUN	
May 7	"Synchronicity"	Nogizaka46	
May 14	"Hayaokuri Calendar"	HKT48	
May 21	"Shinkarion"	Boys and Men	
May 28	"Wake Me Up"	Twice	
June 4	"Cinderella Girl"	King & Prince	
June 11	"Teacher Teacher"	AKB48	
June 18	"Innocent Days"	Sexy Zone	
June 25	"Are You Happy?"	Morning Musume '18	
July 2	"The New Era"	Got7	
July 9	"Blue"	NEWS	
July 16	"Ikinari Punch Line"	SKE48	
July 23	"Love"	Kis-My-Ft2	
July 30	"Gyakuten Lovers"	Ken Tackey	
August 6	"Natsu Hayate"	Arashi	
August 13	"Cosmic Human"	Hey! Say! JUMP	
August 20	"Jikochū de Ikō!"	Nogizaka46	
August 27	"Ambivalent"	Keyakizaka46	
September 3	"Idea"	Gen Hoshino	
September 10	"Idea"	Gen Hoshino	
September 17	"Koko ni"	Kanjani Eight	
September 24	"Ikiro"	NEWS	
October 1	"Sentimental Train"	AKB48	
October 8	"Yeah Yeah Yeah"	Hello! Project All Stars	
October 15	"Kimi, Boku"	Kis-My-Ft2	
October 22	"Memorial"	King & Prince	
October 29	"Boku Datte Naichau yo"	NMB48	
November 5	"Kimi no Uta"	Arashi	
November 12	"Flamingo"	Kenshi Yonezu	
November 19	"Fake Love"	BTS	
November 26	"Kaerimichi wa Tōmawari Shitaku Naru"	Nogizaka46	
December 3	"Old Fashion"	Back Number	
December 10	"No Way Man"	AKB48	
December 17	"Karakuri Darake no Tenderness"	Sexy Zone	
December 24	"Stand by You"	SKE48	
December 31	"Aitai, Aitai, Aenai"	KinKi Kids	
