= List of Oricon number-one singles of 2018 =

The following is a list of Oricon number-one singles of 2018.

== Chart history ==
Issue date	Song	Artist(s)	Ref.
January 1	"White Love"	Hey! Say! JUMP	
January 8	"Warota People"	NMB48	
January 15	"Nigemizu"	Nogizaka46	
January 22	"Muishiki no Iro"	SKE48	
January 29	"LPS"	NEWS	
February 5	"Topaz Love/DESTINY"	KinKi Kids	
February 12	"Kurayami"	STU48	
February 19	"Candy Pop"	Twice	
February 26	"Maeomuke"	Hey! Say! JUMP	
March 5	"Find the Answer"	Arashi	
March 12	"Doraemon"	Gen Hoshino	
March 19	"Glass wo Ware!"	Keyakizaka46	
March 26	"Jabaja"	AKB48	
April 2	"Hare Hare Carnival"	Matsuri nine.	
April 9	"Paint It Black"	BiSH	
April 16	"Yokubomono"	NMB48	
April 23	"Haru wa Dokokara Kurunoka?"	NGT48	
April 30	"Ask Yourself"	KAT-TUN	
May 7	"Synchronicity"	Nogizaka46	
May 14	"Hayaokuri Calendar"	HKT48	
May 21	"Shinkarion"	Boys and Men	
May 28	"Wake Me Up"	Twice	
June 4	"Cinderella Girl"	King & Prince	
June 11	"Teacher Teacher"	AKB48	
June 18	"Innocent Days"	Sexy Zone	
June 25	"Are you Happy? / A gonna"	Morning Musume '18	
July 2	"SUMMER LOVE"	MAG!C☆PRINCE	
July 9	"BLUE"	NEWS	
July 16	"Ikinari PUNCH LINE"	SKE48	
July 23	"LOVE"	Kis-My-Ft2	
July 30	"Gyakuten Lovers"	KEN☆Tackey	
August 6	"Natsu Hayate"	Arashi	
August 13	"COSMIC☆HUMAN"	Hey! Say! JUMP	
August 20	"Jikochu de ikou!"	Nogizaka46	
August 27	"Ambivalent"	Keyakizaka46	
September 3	"one more purple funk... -Komei katana-"	ENDRECHERI	
September 10	"JOY shitai Kimochi"	A.B.C-Z	
September 17	"Koko ni"	Kanjani Eight	
September 24	"Ikiro"	NEWS	
October 1	"Sentimental Train"	AKB48	
October 8	"Yeah Yeah Yeah/Akogare no Stress-free/Hana, Takenawa no Toki"	Hello! Project All Stars	
October 15	"Kimi, Boku."	Kis-My-Ft2	
October 22	"Memorial"	King & Prince	
October 29	"Boku Datte Naichau yo"	NMB48	
November 5	"Kimi no Uta"	Arashi	
November 12	"Flamingo/TEENAGE RIOT"	Kenshi Yonezu	
November 19	"FAKE LOVE/Airplane pt.2"	BTS	
November 26	"Kaerimichi wa Tōmawari Shitaku Naru"	Nogizaka46	
December 3	"Jealous"	TVXQ	
December 10	"No Way Man"	AKB48	
December 17	"Karakuri Darake no Tenderness/Suppin KISS"	Sexy Zone	
December 24	"Stand by You"	SKE48	
December 31	"Aitai, Aitai, Aenai."	KinKi Kids	

== See also ==
- List of Oricon number-one albums of 2018
