= Grotesqqque =

2026 animated anthology film by Atsushi Nishigori

- Theatrical release poster
- Kanji: グロテスク
- Revised Hepburn: Gurotesuku
- Directed by: Atsushi Nishigori
- Screenplay by: Atsushi Nishigori
- Produced by: Yuichi Fukushima
- Starring: Kana Ichinose; Gen Hoshino; Sara Minami; Ikumi Hasegawa; Saori Hayami; Maaya Uchida; Chika Anzai; Nagi Inoue; Miku Ichinose; Nao Tomisato; Aruno Nakanishi
- Edited by: Akinori Mishima
- Music by: Yosuke Hasegawa; Tetsuya Iwasaki
- Production company: CloverWorks
- Distributed by: Aniplex; JOEN
- Release dates: July 24, 2026 (Fantasia); October 8, 2026 (New York City); November 6, 2026 (Japan)
- Running time: 104 minutes
- Country: Japan
- Language: Japanese
- Box office: $297,000

Grotesqqque (Japanese: グロテスク, Hepburn: Gurotesuku; stylized in all caps) is a Japanese animated anthology film written and directed by Atsushi Nishigori. Produced by CloverWorks and distributed by Aniplex and JOEN, the film features an ensemble cast consisting of Chika Anzai, Kana Ichinose, Maaya Uchida, Rumi Okubo, Rie Kugimiya, Miyu Tomita, Ikumi Hasegawa, Saori Hayami, Gen Hoshino, Sara Minami, and Nogizaka46 members Miku Ichinose, Nagi Inoue, Nao Tomisato, and Aruno Nakanishi across three stories containing different worldviews. The film was released in Japanese theaters on November 6, 2026.

== Synopsis ==
The film consists of three stories:

- Aeliens (エリィアンズ, Eriianzu), (Note: Stylized as Æliens.) which focuses on an alien girl's desire to become Earth's goodwill ambassador while attracting unwanted attention to herself and her civil servant ally and witnessing other aliens attack Earth;
- Yoroshiku Girl (夜露死駆★少女, Yoroshiku★Shōjo), also known as 4649 Girl, (Note: The number 4649 can be read in goroawase as "yoroshiku".) which focuses on a high school dropout participating in a legendary high stakes battle royale game named the Queen of Butterflies and becomes forced to work alongside an immensely powerful yet mysterious player; and
- Nocturne: Nuit Grotesque (ノクターン～このグロテスクな夜に～, Nokutān: Kono Gurotesuku na Yoru ni), which focuses on a lonely pure-blooded vampire and her group of human-turned-vampire girls surviving in a world where humanity is extinct, as a life-changing event disrupts the girls' daily lives.

== Voice cast ==
=== Characters in Aeliens ===
Elie (エリー, Erī)
Voiced by: Kana Ichinose
A humanoid alien girl with a deep love for Earth's culture. She arrives at Earth to become its ambassador.
Kento Kunikura (國蔵謙人, Kunikura Kento)
Voiced by: Gen Hoshino
An earnest civil servant who is roped into Elie's unpredictable antics.

=== Characters in Yoroshiku Girl ===
Stella (ステラ, Sutera)
Voiced by: Sara Minami
A high school dropout who decides to join the Queen of Butterflies death game after hearing its urban legend.
Unknown (名無し, Nanashi)
Voiced by: Ikumi Hasegawa
A mysterious player of the Queen of Butterflies wielding extremely powerful equipment.
Hikarin (ヒカリン)
Voiced by: Saori Hayami
A figure involved with the urban legend of the Queen of Butterflies.
Gorgeous☆Mika (ゴージャス☆MIKA, Gōjasu Mika)
Voiced by: Maaya Uchida
A high-ranking player of the Queen of Butterflies possessing immense strength.
Sword (ソード, Sōdo)
Voiced by: Chika Anzai
A fast swordswoman and high-ranking player of the Queen of Butterflies.
Chiffon (しふぉん, Shifuon)
Voiced by: Miyu Tomita
A lonely bombmaker and high-ranking player of the Queen of Butterflies.
Papico (ぱぴこ, Papiko)
Voiced by: Rumi Okubo
A high-ranking player of the Queen of Butterflies with a heightened sense of hearing and a scythe.
Poyomi (ポヨミ)
Voiced by: Rie Kugimiya
The commentator and host of the Queen of Butterflies.

=== Characters in Nocturne: Nuit Grotesque ===
Ayame (アヤメ)
Voiced by: Nagi Inoue
An immortal and pure-blooded vampire and the leader of her party.
Shion (シオン)
Voiced by: Aruno Nakanishi
A human-turned-vampire and member of Ayame's party who begins to sense Ayame's loneliness despite her immortality.
Momo (モモ)
Voiced by: Miku Ichinose
A spoiled human-turned-vampire and member of Ayame's party. She has an appreciation for manga.
Canna (カンナ, Kanna)
Voiced by: Nao Tomisato
A responsible human-turned-vampire and member of Ayame's party, often acting as the group's older sister figure.

== Production ==
After directing Darling in the Franxx in 2018, Atsushi Nishigori was approached by CloverWorks to direct a feature film, though he initially declined in order to rest. Nishigori would nevertheless develop concepts that reflected his passions and styles as an animator, director, and producer, remarking that the project "comes from his heart". He also confessed that he had asked CloverWorks to grant him creative freedom in developing the project.

Realizing his ideas would not be able to fit into one story, Nishigori decided to expand his concepts into three separate stories, adding he was not consciously aiming to tie each of them with a unifying theme and was attracted by their contrasts. He also anticipated that this direction would potentially confuse and bore the audience, so he coordinated with the production team to change each story's style while fine-tuning them and maintaining the project's balance. Nishigori expounded that this allowed each story to shine on their own, from the pastel colors and comedy feel of Aeliens to the arthouse animation and sapphic romance depicted in Nocturne: Nuit Grotesque.

On July 5, 2024, during the CloverWorks industry panel at Anime Expo 2024, the studio teased an original film titled Grotesque that would be directed by Nishigori and distributed by Aniplex and JOEN. CloverWorks would later announce further details of the film during their panel at Anime Expo 2025, revealing it is an omnibus film renamed to Grotesqqque.

== Release ==
The film was initially scheduled to release in 2025, though it would be later delayed. The film was released in Japanese theaters on November 6, 2026. Prior to its release, the film had its world premiere under the Animation Plus section of the 30th Fantasia International Film Festival in Montreal on July 24 of the same year. The film also had its American premiere on October 8, with Japan Society hosting the screening in New York City.

== Music ==
The film features an ensemble of singers and composers, totaling to 35 musical contributors that are split amongst the three stories. Notable contributors include Taku Inoue, Tsumiki, and Nanahira for Aeliens; Reol, Kanon Shizaki, and Rei Yasuda for Yoroshiku Girl; and Kairi Yagi and Eba for Nocturne: Nuit Grotesque. The film's main theme song is "Shoot Shoot Shoot," performed by musical contributor Metalverse. Nishigori revealed that he enlisted the help of Sony Music Japan and Yōsuke Hasegawa, the film's music producer, to develop ideas and compose music that best complement the diverse visuals of each of the three stories.

== Reception ==
=== Box office ===
Grotesqqque earned ¥47.1 million (about $297,000) in its first three days and ranks at #8 in Japan.

=== Critical reception ===
Reuben Baron from Anime News Network gave the film a B+, positively complimenting its overall visuals and music. In rating each of the stories, he commended the creative and entertaining energy of Aeliens and the contemplative and emotional storytelling of Nocturne: Nuit Grotesque while rating Yoroshiku Girl as the weakest due to relying on its style over its lacking narrative, though he acknowledges its interesting premise.

== Other media ==
Three manga one-shots serving as spin-offs of each of the film's stories were released on Shōnen Jump+ in early November. These are Aeliens, the spin-off of the story of the same name; Young Panther 19 Buchigillle Knowing, the spin-off of Yoroshiku Girl; and nocturne ~Kiremeku Yoru, Tsumugu Eien~, the spin-off of Nocturne: Nuit Grotesque.
