= Synchronicity (Nogizaka46 song) =

2018 single by Nogizaka46

- Cover of the Regular edition.

Single by Nogizaka46

from the album Ima ga Omoide ni Naru made
- B-side: "Against"; "Kumo ni Nareba ii" (Type-A); "Atarashii Sekai" (Type-B); "Scout Man" (Type-C); "Tokitokimekimeki" (Type-D); "Kotodamahō" (Regular)
- Released: 25 April 2018 (Japan)
- Genre: J-pop
- Label: N46Div.
- Producer: Yasushi Akimoto

Nogizaka46 singles chronology
"Itsuka Dekiru kara Kyō Dekiru" (2017)	"Synchronicity" (2018)	"Jikochū de Ikō!" (2018)

Music video
- "Synchronicity" on YouTube

"Synchronicity" (Japanese: シンクロニシティ, Hepburn: Shinkuronishiti) is the 20th single by Japanese idol girl group Nogizaka46. It was released on 25 April 2018. It reached number one on the weekly Oricon Singles Chart with 1,117,000 copies sold. It was also number one on the Billboard Japan Hot 100. The song won the Grand Prix at the 60th Japan Record Awards, giving the group their second win in a row.

== Release ==
This single was released in five versions. Type-A, Type-B, Type-C, Type-D and a regular edition.

== Track listing ==
All lyrics written by Yasushi Akimoto.

=== Type-A ===
CD
No.	Title	Length
1.	"Synchronicity" (シンクロニシティ)
2.	"Against"
3.	"Kumo ni Nareba ii" (雲になればいい)
4.	"Synchronicity -off vocal ver.-"
5.	"Against -off vocal ver.-"
6.	"Kumo ni Nareba ii -off vocal ver.-"

=== Type-B ===
CD
No.	Title	Length
1.	"Synchronicity"
2.	"Against"
3.	"Atarashii Sekai" (新しい世界)
4.	"Synchronicity -off vocal ver.-"
5.	"Against -off vocal ver.-"
6.	"Atarashii Sekai -off vocal ver.-"

=== Type-C ===
CD
No.	Title	Length
1.	"Synchronicity"
2.	"Against"
3.	"Scout Man" (スカウトマン)
4.	"Synchronicity -off vocal ver.-" (-off vocal ver.-)
5.	"Against -off vocal ver.-"
6.	"Scout Man -off vocal ver.-"

=== Type-D ===
CD
No.	Title	Length
1.	"Synchronicity"
2.	"Against"
3.	"Tokitokimekimeki" (トキトキメキメキ)
4.	"Synchronicity -off vocal ver.-"
5.	"Against -off vocal ver.-"
6.	"Tokitokimekimeki -off vocal ver.-"

=== Regular Edition ===
CD
No.	Title	Length
1.	"Synchronicity"
2.	"Against"
3.	"Kotodamahō" (言霊砲)
4.	"Synchronicity -off vocal ver.-" (-off vocal ver.-)
5.	"Against -off vocal ver.-"
6.	"Kotodamahō -off vocal ver.-"

== Participating members ==
=== "Synchronicity" ===
- Center: Mai Shiraishi

3rd Row: Sayuri Inoue, Mai Shinuchi, Kazumi Takayama, Minami Hoshino, Yumi Wakatsuki, Hina Higuchi, Ranze Terada

2nd Row: Reika Sakurai, Sayuri Matsumura, Shiori Kubo, Rina Ikoma, Momoko Ōzono, Misa Etō, Manatsu Akimoto

1st Row: Mizuki Yamashita, Miona Hori, Erika Ikuta, Mai Shiraishi (centre), Nanase Nishino, Asuka Saitō, Yūki Yoda

=== Against ===
Centre: Rina Ikoma

1st Generation: Manatsu Akimoto, Erika Ikuta, Rina Ikoma, Sayuri Inoue, Misa Etō, Hina Kawago, Asuka Saitō, Chiharu Saitō, Yūri Saitō, Reika Sakurai, Mai Shiraishi, Kazumi Takayama, Kana Nakada, Nanase Nishino, Ami Noujo, Hina Higuchi, Minami Hoshino, Sayuri Matsumura, Yumi Wakatsuki, Maaya Wada

=== Kumo ni Nareba ii ===
Donworii: Erika Ikuta, Misa Etō, Reika Sakurai

=== Atarashii Sekai ===
Under Members

Centre: Ayane Suzuki

1st Generation: Hina Kawago, Chiharu Saitō, Yūri Saitō, Kana Nakada, Ami Noujo, Maaya Wada

2nd Generation: Karin Itō, Junna Itō, Iori Sagara, Kotoko Sasaki, Ayane Suzuki, Rena Yamazaki, Miria Watanabe

3rd Generation: Riria Itō, Renka Iwamoto, Minami Umezawa, Tamami Sakaguchi, Kaede Satō, Reno Nakamura, Hazuki Mukai, Ayano Christie Yoshida

=== Scout Man ===
Centre: Miona Hori

2nd Generation: Karin Itō, Junna Itō, Iori Sagara, Kotoko Sasaki, Mai Shinuchi, Ayane Suzuki, Ranze Terada, Miona Hori, Rena Yamazaki, Miria Watanabe

=== Toki Toki Meki Meki ===
Centre: Renka Iwamoto

3rd Generation: Riria Itō, Renka Iwamoto, Minami Umezawa, Momoko Ōzono, Shiori Kubo, Tamami Sakaguchi, Kaede Satō, Reno Nakamura, Hazuki Mukai, Mizuki Yamashita, Ayano Christie Yoshida, Yūki Yoda

=== Kotodomaho ===
Imoutozaka: Momoko Ōzono, Shiori Kubo, Mizuki Yamashita, Yūki Yoda

== Chart performance ==
=== Oricon ===
Chart	Peak	Debut sales
Weekly Singles Chart	1	1,117,000
Monthly Singles Chart	1	1,214,510
Yearly Singles Chart	3	1,306,247

=== Billboard Japan ===
Weekly chart	Peak
Japan Hot 100	1
Yearly chart	Peak
Hot 100	6

Preceded by "Influencer" (Nogizaka46)	Japan Record Award Grand Prix; 2018	Succeeded by "Paprika" (Foorin)
