= Sayonara no Imi =

2016 single by Nogizaka46

- Regular edition cover.

Single by Nogizaka46

from the album Umarete Kara Hajimete Mita Yume
- B-side: "Kodoku na Aozora"; "Ano Kyōshitsu" (Type-A); "Buranko" (Type-B); "2do Me no Kiss Kara" (Type-C); "Kimi ni Okuru Hana ga Nai" (Type-D); "Naimononedari" (Regular)
- Released: November 9, 2016 (Japan)
- Genre: J-pop
- Label: N46Div.
- Producer: Yasushi Akimoto

Nogizaka46 singles chronology
"Hadashi de Summer" (2016)	"Sayonara no Imi" (2016)	"Influencer" (2017)

Music video
- "Sayonara no Imi" on YouTube

"Sayonara no Imi" (Japanese: サヨナラの意味; "The meaning of Good-bye") is the 16th single by Japanese idol girl group Nogizaka46. It was released on November 9, 2016. The song became number-one on the weekly Oricon Singles Chart, with 827,717 copies sold. It was also number-one on the Billboard Japan Hot 100. This is the group's first Million single certified by RIAJ.

== Release ==
The single has 5 versions. Type-A, Type-B, Type-C, Type-D and a regular edition. On October 20, 2016, the title song was aired for the first time on the Nogizaka46's All Night Nippon. In this radio show, one of the first generation member Nanami Hashimoto announced that she would retire not only from the group but also from the entertainment industry on her birthday next year. She performed the center position for the first and the last time , and her solo song Naimono Nedari is included in the regular edition.

== Music video ==
The music video for the title song was taken in Shizuoka and Yamanashi Prefecture. The filming was interrupted because a typhoon directly hit the location. It was directed by Shō Yanagisawa, also known as the director of Shiseido and Pokémon Go commercial film.

== Track listing ==
All lyrics written by Yasushi Akimoto.

=== Regular Edition ===
CD
No.	Title	Length
1.	"Sayonara no Imi" (サヨナラの意味)	4:59
2.	"Kodoku na Aozora" (孤独な青空)	3:41
3.	"Naimononedari" (ないものねだり)	3:52
4.	"Sayonara no Imi ～off vocal ver.～" (サヨナラの意味 -off vocal ver.-)
5.	"Kodoku na Aozora ～off vocal ver.～" (孤独な青空 -off vocal ver.-)
6.	"Naimononedari ～off vocal ver.～" (ないものねだり -off vocal ver.-)

=== Type-A ===
CD
No.	Title	Length
1.	"Sayonara no Imi" (サヨナラの意味)	4:59
2.	"Kodoku na Aozora" (孤独な青空)	3:41
3.	"Ano Kyōshitsu" (あの教室)	3:25
4.	"Sayonara no Imi ～off vocal ver.～" (サヨナラの意味 -off vocal ver.-)
5.	"Kodoku na Aozora ～off vocal ver.～" (孤独な青空 -off vocal ver.-)
6.	"Ano Kyōshitsu ～off vocal ver.～" (あの教室 -off vocal ver.-)

DVD
No.	Title	Length
1.	"Sayonara no Imi Music Video" (サヨナラの意味 Music Video)
2.	"Ano Kyōshitsu Music Video" (あの教室 Music Video)
3.	"Documentary: Sayonara no Imi" (ドキュメンタリー～サヨナラの意味～)

=== Type-B ===
CD
No.	Title	Length
1.	"Sayonara no Imi" (サヨナラの意味)	4:59
2.	"Kodoku na Aozora" (孤独な青空)	3:41
3.	"Buranko" (ブランコ)	4:35
4.	"Sayonara no Imi ～off vocal ver.～" (サヨナラの意味 -off vocal ver.-)
5.	"Kodoku na Aozora ～off vocal ver.～" (孤独な青空 -off vocal ver.-)
6.	"Buranko ～off vocal ver.～" (ブランコ -off vocal ver.-)

DVD
No.	Title	Length
1.	"Sayonara no Imi Music Video" (サヨナラの意味 Music Video)
2.	"Buranko Music Video" (ブランコ Music Video)
3.	"Under Documentary: Tsumasaki no Mukou ni" (アンダードキュメンタリー～つま先の向こうに～)

=== Type-C ===
CD
No.	Title	Length
1.	"Sayonara no Imi" (サヨナラの意味)	4:59
2.	"Kodoku na Aozora" (孤独な青空)	3:41
3.	"2-do Me no Kiss Kara" (2度目のキスから)	3:59
4.	"Sayonara no Imi ～off vocal ver.～" (サヨナラの意味 -off vocal ver.-)
5.	"Kodoku na Aozora ～off vocal ver.～" (孤独な青空 -off vocal ver.-)
6.	"2do Me no Kiss Kara ～off vocal ver.～" (2度目のキスから -off vocal ver.-)

DVD
No.	Title	Length
1.	"Sayonara no Imi Music Video" (サヨナラの意味 Music Video)
2.	"2do Me no Kiss Kara Music Video" (2度目のキスから Music Video)
3.	"2016 Nen Nogizaka46: Itsumo to Chigau Natsu First Part" (2016年 乃木坂46～いつもと違う夏～前編)

=== Type-D ===
CD
No.	Title	Length
1.	"Sayonara no Imi" (サヨナラの意味)	4:59
2.	"Kodoku na Aozora" (孤独な青空)	3:41
3.	"Kimi ni Okuru Hana ga Nai" (君に贈る花がない)	4:34
4.	"Sayonara no Imi ～off vocal ver.～" (サヨナラの意味 -off vocal ver.-)
5.	"Kodoku na Aozora ～off vocal ver.～" (孤独な青空 -off vocal ver.-)
6.	"Kimi ni Okuru Hana ga Nai ～off vocal ver.～" (君に贈る花がない -off vocal ver.-)

DVD
No.	Title	Length
1.	"Sayonara no Imi Music Video" (サヨナラの意味 Music Video)
2.	"Kimi ni Okuru Hana ga Nai Music Video" (君に贈る花がない Music Video)
3.	"2016 Nen Nogizaka46: Itsumo to Chigau Natsu Last Part" (2016年 乃木坂46～いつもと違う夏～後編)

== Participating members ==
=== Sayonara no Imi ===
3rd Row: Himeka Nakamoto, Sayuri Inoue, Mai Shinuchi, Reika Sakurai, Rina Ikoma, Minami Hoshino, Hinako Kitano, Marika Itō

2nd Row: Yumi Wakatsuki, Sayuri Matsumura, Miona Hori, Asuka Saitō, Misa Etō, Manatsu Akimoto

1st Row: Kazumi Takayama, Nanase Nishino, Nanami Hashimoto (centre), Mai Shiraishi, Erika Ikuta

== Chart and certifications ==
=== Weekly charts ===
Chart (2016)	Peak position
Japan (Oricon Weekly Singles Chart)	1
Japan (Billboard Japan Hot 100)	1

=== Year-end charts ===
Chart (2016)	Position
Japan (Oricon Yearly Singles Chart)	5
Japan (Japan Hot 100)	13

Chart (2017)	Position
Japan (Japan Hot 100)	41

=== Certifications ===
Region	Certification	Certified units/sales
Japan (RIAJ) Physical single	Million	1,000,000^{^}
Japan (RIAJ) Digital single	Gold	100,000^{*}
^{*} Sales figures based on certification alone.^{^} Shipments figures based on certification alone.
