= Hadashi de Summer =

2016 single by Nogizaka46

- Cover of Type-A edition.

Single by Nogizaka46

from the album Umarete Kara Hajimete Mita Yume
- B-side: "Boku Dake no Hikari"; "Offshore Girl" (Type-A); "Inochi no Shinjitsu Musical" (Type-B); "Hakumai Sama" (Type-C); "Secret Graffiti" (Type-D); "Ikuate no Nai Bokutachi" (Regular)
- Released: July 27, 2016 (Japan)
- Genre: J-pop
- Label: N46Div.
- Producer: Yasushi Akimoto

Nogizaka46 singles chronology
"Harujion ga Sakukoro" (2016)	"Hadashi de Summer" (2016)	"Sayonara no Imi" (2016)

Music video
- "Hadashi de Summer" on YouTube

"Hadashi de Summer" (Japanese: 裸足でSummer; "Barefoot Summer") is the 15th single by Japanese idol girl group Nogizaka46. The center position of the title track is held by Asuka Saito. It was released on July 27, 2016. The song became number-one on the weekly Oricon Singles Chart, with 728,189 copies sold. It was also number-one on the Billboard Japan Hot 100.

== Release ==
This single was released in 5 versions. Type-A, Type-B, Type-C, Type-D and a regular edition. Type-A includes Mai Shiraishi's solo song Offshore Girl and its music video was shot in Guam.

The center position in the choreography for the title song is held by Asuka Saitō. In the group's variety show Nogizaka Kōjichū, she visited Kyaiktiyo Pagoda in Myanmar where her mother's birthplace and prayed for the hit of the single.

== Music video ==
The music video for the title track was shot in Nago and Ginoza in Okinawa Prefecture. It was directed by Takeshi Maruyama who also directed their documentary film Kanashimi no Wasurekata: Documentary of Nogizaka46 in 2015.

== Track listing ==
All lyrics written by Yasushi Akimoto.

=== Regular Edition ===
CD
No.	Title	Length
1.	"Hadashi de Summer" (裸足でSummer)	4:37
2.	"Boku Dake no Hikari" (僕だけの光)	3:52
3.	"Ikuate no Nai Bokutachi" (行くあてのない僕たち)	4:55
4.	"Hadashi de Summer～off vocal ver.～" (裸足でSummer -off vocal ver.-)
5.	"Boku Dake no Hikari～off vocal ver.～" (僕だけの光 -off vocal ver.-)
6.	"Ikuate no Nai Bokutachi～off vocal ver.～" (行くあてのない僕たち -off vocal ver.-)

=== Type-A ===
CD
No.	Title	Length
1.	"Hadashi de Summer" (裸足でSummer)	4:37
2.	"Boku Dake no Hikari" (僕だけの光)	3:52
3.	"Offshore Girl" (オフショアガール)	3:23
4.	"Hadashi de Summer～off vocal ver.～" (裸足でSummer -off vocal ver.-)
5.	"Boku Dake no Hikari～off vocal ver.～" (僕だけの光 -off vocal ver.-)
6.	"Offshore Girl～off vocal ver.～" (オフショアガール -off vocal ver.-)

DVD
No.	Title	Length
1.	"Hadashi de Summer Music Video" (裸足でSummer Music Video)
2.	"Offshore Girl Music Video" (オフショアガール Music Video)
3.	"Manatsu no Zenkoku Tour 2015 All 16 Performances Opening Movie First Part" (ライブ参加者だけが見られた真夏の全国ツアー2015全16公演オープニング映像上巻)

=== Type-B ===
CD
No.	Title	Length
1.	"Hadashi de Summer" (裸足でSummer)	4:37
2.	"Boku Dake no Hikari" (僕だけの光)	3:52
3.	"Inochi no Shinjitsu Musical "Ringo Uri to Kamemushi"" (命の真実 ミュージカル「林檎売りとカメムシ」)	5:14
4.	"Hadashi de Summer～off vocal ver.～" (裸足でSummer -off vocal ver.-)
5.	"Boku Dake no Hikari～off vocal ver.～" (僕だけの光 -off vocal ver.-)
6.	"Inochi no Shinjitsu Musical "Ringo Uri to Kamemushi"～off vocal ver.～" (命の真実 ミュージカル「林檎売りとカメムシ」 -off vocal ver.-)

DVD
No.	Title	Length
1.	"Hadashi de Summer Music Video" (裸足でSummer Music Video)
2.	"Inochi no Shinjitsu Musical "Ringo Uri to Kamemushi"" (命の真実 ミュージカル「林檎売りとカメムシ」)
3.	"Manatsu no Zenkoku Tour 2015 All 16 Performances Opening Movie Last Part" (ライブ参加者だけが見られた真夏の全国ツアー2015全16公演オープニング映像下巻)

=== Type-C ===
CD
No.	Title	Length
1.	"Hadashi de Summer" (裸足でSummer)	4:37
2.	"Boku Dake no Hikari" (僕だけの光)	3:52
3.	"Hakumai Sama" (白米様)	4:06
4.	"Hadashi de Summer～off vocal ver.～" (裸足でSummer -off vocal ver.-)
5.	"Boku Dake no Hikari～off vocal ver.～" (僕だけの光 -off vocal ver.-)
6.	"Hakumai Sama～off vocal ver.～" (白米様 -off vocal ver.-)

DVD
No.	Title	Length
1.	"Hadashi de Summer" (裸足でSummer)
2.	"Hakumai Sama" (白米様)
3.	"Harujion ga Saita Yoru: Mai Fukagawa Graduation Concert Backstage" (ハルジオンが咲いた夜~深川麻衣卒業コンサート バックステージ~)

=== Type-D ===
CD
No.	Title	Length
1.	"Hadashi de Summer" (裸足でSummer)	4:37
2.	"Boku Dake no Hikari" (僕だけの光)	3:52
3.	"Secret Graffiti" (シークレットグラフィティー)	4:11
4.	"Hadashi de Summer～off vocal ver.～" (裸足でSummer -off vocal ver.-)
5.	"Boku Dake no Hikari～off vocal ver.～" (僕だけの光 -off vocal ver.-)
6.	"Secret Graffiti～off vocal ver.～" (シークレットグラフィティー -off vocal ver.-)

DVD
No.	Title	Length
1.	"Hadashi de Summer" (裸足でSummer)
2.	"Secret Graffiti" (シークレットグラフィティー)
3.	"Ikuate no Nai Bokutachi (Short Movie)" (行くあてのない僕たち (ショートムービー))

== Participating members ==
=== Hadashi De Summer ===
3rd Row: Hinako Kitano, Minami Hoshino, Yumi Wakatsuki, Rina Ikoma, Miona Hori, Himeka Nakamoto

2nd Row: Kazumi Takayama, Misa Etō, Sayuri Matsumura, Manatsu Akimoto, Reika Sakurai

1st Row: Nanami Hashimoto, Nanase Nishino, Asuka Saitō (centre), Mai Shiraishi, Erika Ikuta

== Charts ==
=== Weekly charts ===
Chart (2016)	Peak position
Japan (Oricon Weekly Singles Chart)	1
Japan (Billboard Japan Hot 100)	1

=== Year-end charts ===
Chart (2016)	Peak position
Japan (Oricon Yearly Singles Chart)	6
Japan (Japan Hot 100)	15

== Certifications ==
Region	Certification	Certified units/sales
Japan (RIAJ) Physical	3× Platinum	750,000^{^}
Japan (RIAJ) Digital	Gold	100,000^{*}
Streaming
Japan (RIAJ)	Gold	50,000,000^{†}
^{*} Sales figures based on certification alone.^{^} Shipments figures based on certification alone.^{†} Streaming-only figures based on certification alone.
