= Jikochū de Ikō! =

2018 single by Nogizaka46

- Cover of the Regular edition.

Single by Nogizaka46

from the album Ima ga Omoide ni Naru made
- Language: Japanese
- B-side: "Soratobira"; "Sankaku no Akichi" (Type-A); "Jibun janai Kanji" (Type-B); "Kokoro no Monologue" (Type-C); "Chikyu ga Maruinara" (Type-D); "Anna ni Sukidattanoni…" (Regular)
- Released: 8 August 2018 (Japan)
- Genre: J-pop
- Label: N46Div.
- Producer: Yasushi Akimoto

Nogizaka46 singles chronology
"Synchronicity" (2018)	"Jikochū de Ikō!" (2018)	"Kaerimichi wa Tōmawari Shitaku Naru" (2018)

Music video
- "Jikochū de Ikō!" on YouTube

"Jikochū de Ikō!" (Japanese: ジコチューで行こう!; "Let's go with selfishness") is the 21st single by Japanese idol girl group Nogizaka46. The center position of the title track is held by Asuka Saito. It was released on 8 August 2018. It reached number-one on the weekly Oricon Singles Chart with 989,000 copies sold. It was also number-one on the Billboard Japan Hot 100.

== Release ==
This single was released in 5 versions. Type-A, Type-B, Type-C, Type-D and a regular edition.

== Track listing ==
All lyrics written by Yasushi Akimoto.

=== Type-A ===
CD
No.	Title	Length
1.	"Jikochū de Ikō!" (ジコチューで行こう!)
2.	"Soratobira" (空扉)
3.	"Sankaku no Akichi" (三角の空き地)
4.	"Jikochū de Ikō! -off vocal ver.-"
5.	"Soratobira -off vocal ver.-"
6.	"Sankaku no Akichi -off vocal ver.-"

=== Type-B ===
CD
No.	Title	Length
1.	"Jikochū de Ikō!"
2.	"Soratobira"
3.	"Jibun janai Kanji" (自分じゃない感じ)
4.	"Jikochū de Ikō! -off vocal ver.-"
5.	"Soratobira -off vocal ver.-"
6.	"Jibun janai Kanji -off vocal ver.-"

=== Type-C ===
CD
No.	Title	Length
1.	"Jikochū de Ikō!"
2.	"Soratobira"
3.	"Kokoro no Monologue" (心のモノローグ)
4.	"Jikochū de Ikō! -off vocal ver.-"
5.	"Soratobira -off vocal ver.-"
6.	"Kokoro no Monologue -off vocal version-"

=== Type-D ===
CD
No.	Title	Length
1.	"Jikochū de Ikō!"
2.	"Soratobira"
3.	"Chikyu ga Maruinara" (地球が丸いなら)
4.	"Jikochū de Ikō! -off vocal ver.-"
5.	"Soratobira -off vocal ver.-"
6.	"Chikyu ga Maruinara -off vocal ver.-"

=== Regular Edition ===
CD
No.	Title	Length
1.	"Jikochū de Ikō!"
2.	"Soratobira"
3.	"Anna ni Sukidattanoni…" (あんなに好きだったのに…)
4.	"Jikochū de Ikō! -off vocal ver.-"
5.	"Soratobira -off vocal ver.-"
6.	"Anna ni Sukidattanoni… -off vocal ver.-"

== Participating members ==
=== "Jikochū de Ikō!" ===
- Center: Asuka Saitō

3rd Row: Kazumi Takayama, Yuri Saitō, Ayane Suzuki, Minami Hoshino, Mai Shinuchi, Sayuri Inoue

2nd Row: Manatsu Akimoto, Misa Etō, Momoko Ōzono, Minami Umezawa, Renka Iwamoto, Sayuri Matsumura

1st Row: Erika Ikuta, Yūki Yoda, Nanase Nishino, Asuka Saitō (centre), Mai Shiraishi, Miona Hori, Mizuki Yamashita

== Chart performance ==
=== Oricon ===
Chart	Peak	Debut Sales	Sales Total
Weekly Singles Chart	1	989,000	1,061,000

=== Billboard Japan ===
Chart	Peak
Japan Hot 100	1

=== Year-end charts ===
Chart (2018)	Position
Japan (Japan Hot 100)	7
