= Boku dake no Kimi: Under Super Best =

Compilation album by Nogizaka46
- Released: January 10, 2018 (Japan)
- Recorded: 2012–2018
- Genre: J-pop
- Length: 64:23 (Disc 1); 49:52 (Disc 2)
- Label: N46Div.
- Producer: Yasushi Akimoto

Nogizaka46 chronology
Umarete kara Hajimete Mita Yume (2017)	Boku dake no Kimi: Under Super Best (2018)	Ima ga Omoide ni Naru made (2019)

Boku dake no Kimi: Under Super Best (Japanese: 僕だけの君～Under Super Best～; "You only for me") is a compilation album by Japanese idol girl group Nogizaka46. It contains songs performed by, and written for, "Under" members of Nogizaka46, who are not part of the main selection group for major single releases. It was released on January 10, 2018, and reached the top position on the weekly Oricon Albums Chart.

== Release ==
This album was released in 3 versions: a first press specification limited edition, a first press production limited edition, and a regular edition. The CD tracks are identical for all releases.

== Track listing ==
All lyrics written by Yasushi Akimoto.

=== Disc 1 ===
CD
No.	Title	Length
1.	"Hidari Mune no Yūki" (左胸の勇気)	4:55
2.	"Ōkami ni Kuchibue wo" (狼に口笛を)	2:58
3.	"Namida ga Mada Kanashimi Datta Koro" (涙がまだ悲しみだった頃)	4:20
4.	"Haru no Melody" (春のメロディー)	4:47
5.	"13nichi no Kinyōbi" (13日の金曜日)	3:42
6.	"Senpūki" (扇風機)	3:57
7.	"Hatsukoi no Hito wo Ima demo" (初恋の人を今でも)	3:45
8.	"Umareta Mama de" (生まれたままで)	4:42
9.	"Koko ni Iru Riyū" (ここにいる理由)	3:55
10.	"Ano Hi, Boku wa Tossa ni Uso wo Tsuita" (あの日 僕は咄嗟に嘘をついた)	4:13
11.	"Kimi wa Boku to Awanai hō ga Yokatta no kana" (君は僕と会わない方がよかったのかな)	5:06
12.	"Wakaregiwa, Motto Suki ni Naru" (別れ際、もっと好きになる)	4:17
13.	"Shitto no Kenri" (嫉妬の権利)	5:18
14.	"Futōgō" (不等号)	4:17
15.	"Secret Graffiti" (シークレットグラフィティー)	4:11
Total length:		64:23

=== Disc 2 ===
CD
No.	Title	Length
1.	"Buranko" (ブランコ)	4:35
2.	"Fūsen wa Ikiteiru" (風船は生きている)	4:33
3.	"Under" (アンダー)	4:11
4.	"My rule"	4:33
5.	"Jiyū no Kanata" (自由の彼方)	5:02
6.	"Yokubō no Reincarnation" (欲望のリインカーネーション)	4:19
7.	"Kimi ga Aoide Kureta" (君が扇いでくれた)	4:04
8.	"Jibun no Koto" (自分のこと)	4:52
9.	"Unubore Beach" (自惚れビーチ)	4:17
10.	"Sono Hito" (その女)	4:26
11.	"Dare Yori soba ni Itai" (誰よりそばにいたい)	5:00
Total length:		49:52

== Weekly charts ==
Chart (2018)	Peak position
Japan (Oricon Albums Chart)	1
