= Influencer (song) =

2017 single by Nogizaka46

- Cover of the regular edition

Single by Nogizaka46

from the album Umarete Kara Hajimete Mita Yume
- B-side: "Jinsei o Kangaetakunaru"; "Igai BREAK" (Type-A); "Another Ghost" (Type-B); "Fūsen wa Ikiteiru" (Type-C); "Sanbanme no Kaze" (Type-D); "Atarisawari no Nai Hanashi" (Regular)
- Released: 22 March 2017 (Japan)
- Genre: J-pop
- Length: 4:30
- Label: N46Div.
- Composers: Shinya Sumida; APAZZI (arr.)
- Lyricist: Yasushi Akimoto
- Producer: Yasushi Akimoto

Nogizaka46 singles chronology
| "Sayonara no Imi" (2016) | "Influencer" (2017) | "Nigemizu" (2017) |

Music video
- "Influencer" on YouTube "Influencer" (Sony Music Taiwan) on YouTube

"Influencer" (Japanese: インフルエンサー, Hepburn: Infuruensā) is the 17th single by Japanese idol girl group Nogizaka46. It was released on 22 March 2017. It reached number-one on the weekly Oricon Singles Chart with 874,528 copies sold. It was also number-one on the Billboard Japan Hot 100. The song won the Grand Prix at the 59th Japan Record Awards.

== Release ==
This single was released in 5 versions. Type-A, Type-B, Type-C, Type-D and a regular edition.

== Track listing ==
=== Type-A ===
CD
| No. | Title | Lyrics | Music | Arrangement | Length |
|---|---|---|---|---|---|
| 1. | "Influencer" (インフルエンサー) | Yasushi Akimoto | Shinya Sumida | APAZZI | 4:30 |
| 2. | "Jinsei o Kangaetakunaru" (人生を考えたくなる) | Akimoto | Shutaro Katagiri | Shutaro Katagiri | 4:29 |
| 3. | "Igai BREAK" (意外BREAK) | Akimoto | Sumida | Daisuke Kahara | 4:15 |
| 4. | "Influencer -off vocal ver.-" | | Sumida | APAZZI | 4:30 |
| 5. | "Jinsei wo Kangaetakunaru -off vocal ver.-" | | Katagiri | Katagiri | 4:29 |
| 6. | "Igai Break -off vocal ver.-" | | Sumida | Kahara | 4:14 |
| Total length: | | | | | 26:27 |

DVD
| No. | Title | Director(s) | Length |
|---|---|---|---|
| 1. | "Influencer Music Video" | Takeshi Maruyama | 4:44 |
| 2. | "Igai BREAK Music Video" | Shūto Itō | 4:37 |
| 3. | "Hinako Kitano" | Tetsuya Karasawa | 5:31 |
| 4. | "Chiharu Saitō" | Hiroshū | 2:38 |
| 5. | "Kotoko Sasaki" | Kazuhisa Anai | 4:05 |
| 6. | "Kazumi Takayama" | Hiroyuki Abe | 5:05 |
| 7. | "Ranze Terada" | Yoshiyuki Shimada | 5:19 |
| 8. | "Nanase Nishino" | Yasuhiro Arafune | 5:13 |
| 9. | "Sayuri Matsumura" | Shōta Mori | 5:00 |
| 10. | "Māya Wada" | Shingo Tanaka | 4:20 |
| 11. | "Renka Iwamoto" | Itō | 5:05 |
| 12. | "Minami Umezawa" | Yukinori Makabe; Takashi Ītsuka | 5:04 |
| 13. | "Shiori Kubo" | Yūsuke Koroyasu | 5:09 |
| Total length: | | | 1:01:50 |

=== Type-B ===
CD
| No. | Title | Lyrics | Music | Arrangement | Length |
|---|---|---|---|---|---|
| 1. | "Influencer" | Akimoto | Sumida | APAZZI | 4:30 |
| 2. | "Jinsei o Kangaetakunaru" | Akimoto | Katagiri | Katagiri | 4:29 |
| 3. | "Another Ghost" | Akimoto | Junya Maesako | Ishio Yasutaka | 3:53 |
| 4. | "Influencer -off vocal ver.-" | | Sumida | APAZZI | 4:30 |
| 5. | "Jinsei wo Kangaetakunaru -off vocal ver.-" | | Katagiri | Katagiri | 4:29 |
| 6. | "Another Ghost -off vocal ver.-" | | Maesako | Yasutaka | 3:51 |
| Total length: | | | | | 25:42 |

DVD
| No. | Title | Director(s) | Length |
|---|---|---|---|
| 1. | "Influencer Music Video" | Maruyama | 4:44 |
| 2. | "Another Ghost Music Video" | Tsuyoshi Inoue | 4:10 |
| 3. | "Rina Ikoma" | Yūki Houe | 2:01 |
| 4. | "Hina Kawago" | Kento Takasaki; Mahomi Uno | 3:33 |
| 5. | "Iori Sagara" | Rikiya Imaizumi | 4:41 |
| 6. | "Reika Sakurai" | Takeshi Izumida | 5:05 |
| 7. | "Mai Shiraishi" | Keisuke Tamura | 4:20 |
| 8. | "Mai Shinuchi" | Hiroto Hara | 5:37 |
| 9. | "Ami Nōjō" | Kentarō Shima | 6:36 |
| 10. | "Minami Hoshino" | Ryo Miyamoto | 5:05 |
| 11. | "Tatami Sakaguchi" | Shōta Miyake | 5:13 |
| 12. | "Kaeda Satō" | Natsuki Ie | 2:18 |
| 13. | "Mizuki Yamashita" | Atsuhiro Yamada | 5:07 |
| Total length: | | | 58:30 |

=== Type-C ===
CD
| No. | Title | Lyrics | Music | Arrangement | Length |
|---|---|---|---|---|---|
| 1. | "Influencer" | Akimoto | Sumida | APAZZI | 4:30 |
| 2. | "Jinsei o Kangaetakunaru" | Akimoto | Katagiri | Katagiri | 4:29 |
| 3. | "Fūsen wa Ikiteiru" (風船は生きている) | Akimoto | Yoshinobu Izumi; Shōta Miyoshi | Hirotaka Hayakawa; Shōta Miyoshi | 4:33 |
| 4. | "Influencer -off vocal ver.-" | | Sumida | APAZZI | 4:30 |
| 5. | "Jinsei wo Kangaetakunaru -off vocal ver.-" | | Katagiri | Katagiri | 4:29 |
| 6. | "Fūsen wa Ikiteiru -off vocal ver.-" | | Izumi; Miyoshi | Hayakawa; Miyoshi | 4:32 |
| Total length: | | | | | 27:03 |

DVD
| No. | Title | Director(s) | Length |
|---|---|---|---|
| 1. | "Influencer Music Video" | Maruyama | 4:44 |
| 2. | "Fūsen wa Ikiteiru Music Video" | Takuya Tada | 4:44 |
| 3. | "Karin Itō" | Kame Fukunaga | 5:05 |
| 4. | "Marika Itō" | Maki Fukushima | 4:26 |
| 5. | "Sayuri Inoue" | Santa Yamagishi | 5:25 |
| 6. | "Misa Etō" | Kenta Hirai | 4:05 |
| 7. | "Asuka Saitō" | Kentarō Kauchi | 4:40 |
| 8. | "Hina Higuchi" | Hidenobu Abera | 5:12 |
| 9. | "Yumi Wakatsuki" | Yūki Wakisaka | 4:17 |
| 10. | "Miria Watanabe" | Taikō Nakamura | 5:05 |
| 11. | "Riria Itō" | Takayuki Hayashi | 5:16 |
| 12. | "Momoko Ōzono" | Yurugu Matsumoto | 4:59 |
| 13. | "Reno Nakamura" | Eri Yoshikawa | 4:40 |
| Total length: | | | 1:02:38 |

=== Type-D ===
CD
| No. | Title | Lyrics | Music | Arrangement | Length |
|---|---|---|---|---|---|
| 1. | "Influencer" | Akimoto | Sumida | APAZZI | 4:30 |
| 2. | "Jinsei o Kangaetakunaru" | Akimoto | Katagiri | Katagiri | 4:29 |
| 3. | "Sanbanme no Kaze" (三番目の風) | Akimoto | Manabu Mirutani | Mirutani | 5:07 |
| 4. | "Influencer -off vocal ver.-" | | Sumida | APAZZI | 4:30 |
| 5. | "Jinsei wo Kangaetakunaru -off vocal ver.-" | | Katagiri | Katagiri | 4:29 |
| 6. | "Sanbanme no Kaze -off vocal ver.-" | | Mirutani | Mirutani | 5:06 |
| Total length: | | | | | 28:11 |

DVD
| No. | Title | Director(s) | Length |
|---|---|---|---|
| 1. | "Influencer Music Video" | Maruyama | 4:44 |
| 2. | "Sanbanme no Kaze Music Video" | Tarō Okagawa | 5:19 |
| 3. | "Manatsu Akimoto" | Hiroaki Yuasa | 4:59 |
| 4. | "Erika Ikuta" | Jikan | 5:47 |
| 5. | "Junna Itō" | Naoto Kawashima | 5:05 |
| 6. | "Mahiro Kawamura" | Hiroki Mayama | 4:50 |
| 7. | "Yuri Saitō" | Chiaki Matsumoto | 5:06 |
| 8. | "Ayane Suzuki" | Kenu Nomura; Takeshi Ōishi | 3:01 |
| 9. | "Kana Nakada" | Atsuhiko Yamamoto | 4:25 |
| 10. | "Miona Hori" | Shigeru Tsukita; Makoto Shibatani | 5:05 |
| 11. | "Rena Yamazaki" | Tomohiko Saegusa | 3:38 |
| 12. | "Hazuki Mukai" | Yurie Yano; Kento Yamaguchi | 2:23 |
| 13. | "Ayano Christie Yoshida" | Seiji Kofune | 4:32 |
| 14. | "Yūki Yoda" | Tsukita; Shibatani | 5:12 |
| Total length: | | | 1:04:06 |

=== Regular Edition ===
CD
| No. | Title | Lyrics | Music | Arrangement | Length |
|---|---|---|---|---|---|
| 1. | "Influencer" | Akimoto | Sumida | APAZZI | 4:30 |
| 2. | "Jinsei o Kangaetakunaru" | Akimoto | Katagiri | Katagiri | 4:29 |
| 3. | "Atarisawari no Nai Hanashi" (当たり障りのない話) | Akimoto | Jun Koami | Yuichi "Masa" Nonaka | 4:30 |
| 4. | "Influencer -off vocal ver.-" | | Sumida | APAZZI | 4:30 |
| 5. | "Jinsei o Kangaetakunaru -off vocal ver.-" | | Katagiri | Katagiri | 4:29 |
| 6. | "Atarisawari no Nai Hanashi -off vocal ver.-" | | Koami | Nonaka | 4:28 |
| Total length: | | | | | 26:56 |

=== Special Edition ===
All tracks are written by Yasushi Akimoto.

Digital download
| No. | Title | Music | Arrangement | Length |
|---|---|---|---|---|
| 1. | "Influencer" | Sumida | APAZZI | 4:30 |
| 2. | "Jinsei o Kangaetakunaru" | Katagiri | Katagiri | 4:29 |
| 3. | "Igai BREAK" | Sumida | Kahara | 4:15 |
| 4. | "Another Ghost" | Maesako | Yasutaka | 3:53 |
| 5. | "Fūsen wa Ikiteiru" | Izumi; Miyoshi | Hayakawa; Miyoshi | 4:33 |
| 6. | "Sanbanme no Kaze" | Mirutani | Mirutani | 5:07 |
| 7. | "Atarisawari no Nai Hanashi" | Koami | Nonaka | 4:30 |
| Total length: | | | | 31:17 |

== Participating members ==
Note: Center position of each song in bold

=== "Influencer" ===
Performing by selected members (Senbatsu)

- Third row: Mai Shinuchi, Sayuri Inoue, Ranze Terada, Hinako Kitano, Marika Itō, Minami Hoshino, Yuri Saitō, Hina Higuchi, Kana Nakada
- Second row: Yumi Wakatsuki, Kazumi Takayama, Rina Ikoma, Erika Ikuta, Sayuri Matsumura, Reika Sakurai
- First row: Manatsu Akimoto, Miona Hori, **Nanase Nishino**, **Mai Shiraishi**, Asuka Saitō, Misa Etō

=== "Jinsei o Kangaetakunaru" ===
Performing by Joshikō Quartet unit

- Kana Nakada, Manatsu Akimoto, Reika Sakurai, Yumi Wakatsuki

=== "Igai BREAK" ===
Performing by Anegozaka unit

- Kazumi Takayama, **Mai Shiraishi**, Misa Etō, Sayuri Matsumura

=== "Another Ghost" ===
Performing by Nasuka unit

- Asuka Saitō, Marika Itō, **Nanase Nishino**

=== "Fūsen wa Ikiteiru" ===
Performing by non-selected members (Under Members)

- Ami Nōjō, Ayane Suzuki, Chiharu Saitō, Hina Kawago, Iori Sagara, Junna Itō, Karin Itō, Kotoko Sasaki, Mahiro Kawamura, Māya Wada, **Miria Watanabe**, Rena Yamazaki

=== "Sanbanme no Kaze" ===
Performing by all third generation members

- Ayano Christie Yoshida, Hazuki Mukai, Kaede Satō, Minami Umezawa, Mizuki Yamashita, **Momoko Ōzono**, Renka Iwamoto, Reno Nakamura, Riria Itō, Shiori Kubo, Tamami Sakaguchi, Yūki Yoda

=== "Atarisawari no Nai Hanashi" ===
Performing by Kasumi Kusa unit

- Minami Hoshino, Miona Hori, Rina Ikoma, Sayuri Inoue

== Chart performance ==
=== Oricon ===
| Chart | Peak | Sales |
|---|---|---|
| Weekly Singles Chart | 1 | 874,528 |
| Yearly Singles Chart | 6 | 1,028,173 |

=== Billboard Japan ===
| Weekly Chart | Peak |
|---|---|
| Japan Hot 100 | 1 |
| Radio Songs | 4 |
| Top Singles Sales | 1 |

| Yearly Chart | Peak |
|---|---|
| Hot 100 | 7 |
| Download song | 60 |
| Streaming song | 34 |

| Preceded by "Anata no Suki na Tokoro" (Kana Nishino) | Japan Record Award Grand Prix; 2017 | Succeeded by "Synchronicity" (Nogizaka46) |
