= Nigemizu =

2017 single by Nogizaka46

- Cover of the Regular edition.

Single by Nogizaka46

from the album Ima ga Omoide ni Naru made
- B-side: "Onna wa Hitori ja Nemurenai"; "Hitonatsu no Nagasa yori…" (Type-A); "Under" (Type-B); "Live Shin" (Type-C); "Mirai no Kotae" (Type-D); "Naitatte Iijanaika??" (Regular)
- Released: 9 August 2017 (Japan)
- Genre: J-pop
- Label: N46Div.
- Producer: Yasushi Akimoto

Nogizaka46 singles chronology
"Influencer" (2017)	"Nigemizu" (2017)	"Itsuka Dekiru kara Kyō Dekiru" (2017)

Music video
- "Nigemizu" on YouTube

"Nigemizu" (Japanese: 逃げ水; "Inferior mirage") is the 18th single by Japanese idol girl group Nogizaka46. It was released on 9 August 2017. It reached number one on the weekly Oricon Singles Chart with 880,018 copies sold. It was also number one on the Billboard Japan Hot 100.

== Release ==
This single was released in 5 versions. Type-A, Type-B, Type-C, Type-D and a regular edition.

== Track listing ==
All lyrics written by Yasushi Akimoto.

=== Type-A ===
CD
No.	Title	Length
1.	"Nigemizu" (逃げ水)
2.	"Onna wa Hitori ja Nemurenai" (女は一人じゃ眠れない)
3.	"Hitonatsu no Nagasa yori…" (ひと夏の長さより…)
4.	"Nigemizu -off vocal ver.-"
5.	"Onna wa Hitori ja Nemurenai -off vocal ver.-"
6.	"Hitonatsu no Nagasa yori… -off vocal ver.-"

=== Type-B ===
CD
No.	Title	Length
1.	"Nigemizu"
2.	"Onna wa Hitori ja Nemurenai"
3.	"Under" (アンダー)
4.	"Nigemizu -off vocal ver.-"
5.	"Onna wa Hitori ja Nemurenai -off vocal ver.-"
6.	"Under -off vocal ver.-"

=== Type-C ===
CD
No.	Title	Length
1.	"Nigemizu"
2.	"Onna wa Hitori ja Nemurenai"
3.	"Live Shin" (ライブ神)
4.	"Nigemizu -off vocal ver.-"
5.	"Onna wa Hitori ja Nemurenai -off vocal ver.-"
6.	"Live Sin -off vocal ver.-"

=== Type-D ===
CD
No.	Title	Length
1.	"Nigemizu"
2.	"Onna wa Hitori ja Nemurenai"
3.	"Mirai no Kotae" (未来の答え)
4.	"Nigemizu -off vocal ver.-"
5.	"Onna wa Hitori ja Nemurenai -off vocal ver.-"
6.	"Mirai no Kotae -off vocal ver.-"

=== Regular Edition ===
CD
No.	Title	Length
1.	"Nigemizu"
2.	"Onna wa Hitori ja Nemurenai"
3.	"Naitatte Iijanaika??" (泣いたっていいじゃないか?)
4.	"Nigemizu -off vocal ver.-"
5.	"Onna wa Hitori ja Nemurenai -off vocal ver.-"
6.	"Naitatte Iijanaika?? -off vocal ver.-"

== Participating members ==
=== "Nigemizu" ===
- Center: Yūki Yoda and Momoko Ōzono

3rd Row: Marika Itō, Mai Shinuchi, Rina Ikoma, Reika Sakurai, Yumi Wakatsuki, Sayuri Inoue

2nd Row: Minami Hoshino, Sayuri Matsumura, Erika Ikuta, Manatsu Akimoto, Misa Etō, Kazumi Takayama

1st Row: Asuka Saitō, Mai Shiraishi, Momoko Ozonō, Yūki Yoda, Nanase Nishino, Miona Hori

=== "Hitonatsu no Nagasa yori…" ===
Centre: Manatsu Akimoto and Sayuri Matsumura

1st Gen: Manatsu Akimoto, Erika Ikuta, Rina Ikoma, Marika Itō, Sayuri Inoue, Misa Etō, Asuka Saitō, Reika Sakurai, Mai Shiraishi, Kazumi Takayama, Nanase Nishino, Minami Hoshino, Sayuri Matsumura, Yumi Wakatsuki

2nd Gen: Mai Shinuchi, Miona Hori

3rd Gen: Momoko Ōzono, Yūki Yoda

== Chart performance ==
=== Oricon ===
Chart	Peak	Debut sales
Weekly Singles Chart	1	880,018

=== Billboard Japan ===
Chart	Peak
Japan Hot 100	1

=== Year end ===
Chart	Peak
Japan (Japan Hot 100)	12
