= Kaerimichi wa Tōmawari Shitaku Naru =

2018 single by Nogizaka46

- Regular edition

Single by Nogizaka46

from the album Ima ga Omoide ni Naru made
- B-side: "Caravan wa Nemuranai"; "Tsuzuku" (Type-A); "Nichijō" (Type-B); "Kokuhaku no Junban" (Type-C); "Chopin no Usotsuki" (Type-D); "Shiritai Kotō" (Regular)
- Released: 14 November 2018 (Japan)
- Genre: J-pop
- Length: 4:29
- Label: N46Div.
- Producer: Yasushi Akimoto

Nogizaka46 singles chronology
"Jikochū de Ikō!" (2018)	"Kaerimichi wa Tōmawari Shitaku Naru" (2018)	"Sing Out!" (2019)

Music video
- "Kaerimichi wa Tōmawari Shitaku Naru" on YouTube

"Kaerimichi wa Tōmawari Shitaku Naru" (Japanese: 帰り道は遠回りしたくなる; "I want to make a detour on my way home") is the 22nd single by Japanese idol girl group Nogizaka46. It was released on 14 November 2018. It reached number one on the weekly Oricon Singles Chart with 1.063 million copies sold, and also debuted at number one on the Billboard Japan Hot 100. It marks Nanase Nishino's graduation from the group.

== Release ==
This single was released in 5 versions. Type-A, Type-B, Type-C, Type-D and a regular edition.

== Track listing ==
All lyrics written by Yasushi Akimoto.

=== Type-A ===
CD
No.	Title	Length
1.	"Kaerimichi wa Tōmawari Shitaku Naru" (帰り道は遠回りしたくなる)	4:29
2.	"Caravan wa Nemuranai" (キャラバンは眠らない)	4:09
3.	"Tsuzuku" (つづく)	4:28
4.	"Kaerimichi wa Tōmawari Shitaku Naru -off vocal ver.-"	4:29
5.	"Caravan wa Nemuranai -off vocal ver.-"	4:09
6.	"Tsuzuku -off vocal ver.-"	4:26

=== Type-B ===
CD
No.	Title	Length
1.	"Kaerimichi wa Tōmawari Shitaku Naru"	4:29
2.	"Caravan wa Nemuranai"	4:09
3.	"Nichijō" (日常)	4:08
4.	"Kaerimichi wa Tōmawari Shitaku Naru -off vocal ver.-"	4:29
5.	"Caravan wa Nemuranai -off vocal ver.-"	4:09
6.	"Nichijō -off vocal ver.-"	4:06

=== Type-C ===
CD
No.	Title	Length
1.	"Kaerimichi wa Tōmawari Shitaku Naru"	4:29
2.	"Caravan wa Nemuranai"	4:09
3.	"Kokuhaku no Junban" (告白の順番)	4:08
4.	"Kaerimichi wa Tōmawari Shitaku Naru -off vocal ver.-"	4:29
5.	"Caravan wa Nemuranai -off vocal ver.-"	4:09
6.	"Kokuhaku no Junban -off vocal ver.-"	4:07

=== Type-D ===
CD
No.	Title	Length
1.	"Kaerimichi wa Tōmawari Shitaku Naru"	4:29
2.	"Caravan wa Nemuranai"	4:09
3.	"Chopin no Usotsuki" (ショパンの嘘つき)	4:08
4.	"Kaerimichi wa Tōmawari Shitaku Naru -off vocal ver.-"	4:29
5.	"Caravan wa Nemuranai -off vocal ver.-"	4:09
6.	"Chopin no Usotsuki -off vocal ver.-"	4:07

=== Regular edition ===
CD
No.	Title	Length
1.	"Kaerimichi wa Tōmawari Shitaku Naru"	4:29
2.	"Caravan wa Nemuranai"	4:09
3.	"Shiritai Kotō" (知りたいこと)	4:37
4.	"Kaerimichi wa Tōmawari Shitaku Naru -off vocal ver.-"	4:29
5.	"Caravan wa Nemuranai -off vocal ver.-"	4:09
6.	"Shiritai Kotō -off vocal ver.-"	4:36

== Participating members ==
=== "Kaerimichi wa Tōmawari Shitaku Naru" ===
- Center: Nanase Nishino

3rd Row: Yūri Saitō, Sayuri Inoue, Kaede Satō, Momoko Ōzono, Riria Itō, Mai Shinuchi, Kazumi Takayama

2nd Row: Misa Etō, Manatsu Akimoto, Miona Hori, Yumi Wakatsuki, Minami Hoshino, Reika Sakurai, Sayuri Matsumura

1st Row: Minami Umezawa, Mizuki Yamashita, Asuka Saitō, Nanase Nishino (centre), Mai Shiraishi, Erika Ikuta, Yūki Yoda

== Chart performance ==
=== Oricon ===
Chart	Peak	Debut Sales	Sales Total
Weekly Singles Chart	1	1,063,000	1,235,467

=== Billboard Japan ===
Chart	Peak
Japan Hot 100	1
