= Umarete kara Hajimete Mita Yume =

Umarete Kara Hajimete Mita Yume

Studio album by Nogizaka46
- Released: May 24, 2017 (Japan)
- Genre: J-POP
- Label: N46Div.
- Producer: Yasushi Akimoto

Nogizaka46 chronology
Sorezore no Isu (2016)	Umarete Kara Hajimete Mita Yume (2017)	Boku dake no Kimi: Under Super Best (2018)

Singles from Umarete Kara Hajimete Mita Yume
- 1. "Hadashi de Summer" Released: 27 July 2016; 2. "Sayonara no Imi" Released: 9 November 2016; 3. "Influencer" Released: 22 March 2017

Umarete Kara Hajimete Mita Yume (Japanese: 生まれてから初めて見た夢, "The first dream I had since I was born") is the third album by Japanese idol girl group Nogizaka46. It was released on 24 May 2017. It was number-one on the Oricon weekly Albums Chart, with 342,487 copies sold. It was also number-one the Billboard Japan Hot Albums and Top Albums Sales charts.

== Release ==
This single was released in 4 versions. Type-A, Type-B and a First press limited edition, regular edition.

== Track listing ==
CD
No.	Title	Length
1.	"Hadashi de Summer" (裸足でSummer)
2.	"Sayonara no Imi" (サヨナラの意味)
3.	"Influencer" (インフルエンサー)
4.	"Secret Graffiti" (シークレットグラフィティー)
5.	"Akai Buranko" (赤いブランコ)
6.	"Fusen ha Ikiteiru" (風船は生きている)
7.	"Skydiving" (スカイダイビング)
8.	"Sanbanme no Kaze" (三番目の風)
9.	"Ryusei Discotic" (流星ディスコティック)
10.	"Bokyaku to Bigaku" (忘却と美学)
11.	"Nidome no Kiss kara" (2度目のキスから)
12.	"Inochi no Sinjitsu Musical「Ringouri to Kamemushi」" (命の真実 ミュージカル「林檎売りとカメムシ」)
13.	"Ikuate no Nai Bokutachi" (行くあてのない僕たち)
14.	"Atarisawari no Nai Hanashi" (当たり障りのない話)

=== First press limited edition ===
CD
No.	Title	Length
1.	"Hadashi de Summer" (裸足でSummer)
2.	"Sayonara no Imi" (サヨナラの意味)
3.	"Influencer" (インフルエンサー)
4.	"Secret Graffiti" (シークレットグラフィティー)
5.	"Akai Buranko" (赤いブランコ)
6.	"Fusen ha Ikiteiru" (風船は生きている)
7.	"Skydiving" (スカイダイビング)
8.	"Sanbanme no Kaze" (三番目の風)
9.	"Kimi ga Aoidekureta" (君が扇いでくれた)
10.	"Omoide First" (思い出ファースト)
11.	"Setteiondo" (設定温度)
12.	"Kodoku na Aozora" (孤独な青空)
13.	"Bokudake no Hikari" (僕だけの光)
14.	"Jinnsei wo Kangaetakunaru" (人生を考えたくなる)
15.	"Igai BREAK" (意外BREAK)

=== Type A ===
CD
No.	Title	Length
1.	"Hadashi de Summer" (裸足でSummer)
2.	"Sayonara no Imi" (サヨナラの意味)
3.	"Influencer" (インフルエンサー)
4.	"Secret Graffiti" (シークレットグラフィティー)
5.	"Buranko" (赤いブランコ)
6.	"風船は生きている"
7.	"Skydiving" (スカイダイビング)
8.	"三番目の風"
9.	"Rewindあの日"
10.	"ごめんね、スムージー"
11.	"醜い私"
12.	"オフショアガール"
13.	"君に贈る花がない"
14.	"白米様"

=== Type B ===
CD
No.	Title	Length
1.	"Hadashi de Summer" (裸足でSummer)
2.	"Sayonara no Imi" (サヨナラの意味)
3.	"Influencer" (インフルエンサー)
4.	"Secret Graffiti" (シークレットグラフィティー)
5.	"Buranko" (赤いブランコ)
6.	"風船は生きている"
7.	"Skydiving" (スカイダイビング)
8.	"三番目の風"
9.	"硬い殻のように抱きしめたい"
10.	"満月が消えた"
11.	"ワタボコリ"
12.	"ないものねだり"
13.	"Another Ghost"
14.	"あの教室"

== charts ==
=== Weekly ===
Chart (2017)	Peak position
Japan (Billboard Japan Hot Albums)	1
Japan (Billboard Japan Top Albums Sales)	1
Japan (Oricon Albums Chart)	1

=== Yearly ===
Chart (2017)	Peak position
Japan (Billboard Japan Hot Albums)	14
Japan (Oricon Albums Chart)	7

== Sales ==
Country	Chart	Sales
Japan	Oricon Albums Chart	365,569
