= Ima ga Omoide ni Naru made =

Studio album by Nogizaka46
- Released: April 17, 2019 (Japan)
- Recorded: 2017–2019
- Genre: J-pop
- Label: N46Div
- Producer: Yasushi Akimoto

Nogizaka46 chronology
| Boku dake no Kimi: Under Super Best (2018) | Ima ga Omoide ni Naru made (2019) | Time Flies (2021) |

Singles from Ima ga Omoide ni Naru made
- 1. "Nigemizu" Released: August 9, 2017; 2. "Itsuka Dekiru kara Kyō Dekiru" Released: October 11, 2017; 3. "Synchronicity" Released: April 25, 2018; 4. "Jikochū de Ikō!" Released: August 8, 2018; 5. "Kaerimichi wa Tōmawari Shitaku Naru" Released: November 14, 2018

Ima ga Omoide ni Naru made (Japanese: 今が思い出になるまで; "Until now become a memory") is the fourth album by Japanese idol girl group Nogizaka46. It was released on 17 April 2019. The album reached the top position on the weekly Oricon Albums Chart, with 446,618 copies sold. It also reached number one on the Billboard Japan Hot Albums and Top Albums Sales charts.

== Release ==
This album was released in 4 versions: Type-A, Type-B, first press limited edition, and a regular edition.

== Track listing ==
All lyrics written by Yasushi Akimoto.

=== Type-A ===
CD
| No. | Title | Length |
|---|---|---|
| 1. | "Arigachi na Renai" |
| 2. | "Nigemizu" |
| 3. | "Itsuka Dekiru kara Kyō Dekiru" |
| 4. | "Synchronicity" |
| 5. | "Jikochu de Ikō!" |
| 6. | "Kaerimichi wa Tōmawari Shitaku Naru" |
| 7. | "Under" |
| 8. | "My rule" |
| 9. | "Atarashii Sekai" |
| 10. | "Sankaku no Akichi" |
| 11. | "Nichijō" |
| 12. | "Hozue wo Tsuite ha Nemurenai" (頬杖をついては眠れない) |
| 13. | "Bocchitō" (ぼっち党) |
| 14. | "Boku no Shōdō" (僕の衝動) |
| 15. | "Scout Man" (スカウトマン) |

=== Type-B ===
CD
| No. | Title | Length |
|---|---|---|
| 1. | "Arigachi na Renai" |
| 2. | "Nigemizu" |
| 3. | "Itsuka Dekiru kara Kyō Dekiru" |
| 4. | "Synchronicity" |
| 5. | "Jikochu de Ikō!" |
| 6. | "Kaerimichi wa Tōmawari Shitaku Naru" |
| 7. | "Under" |
| 8. | "My rule" |
| 9. | "Atarashii Sekai" |
| 10. | "Sankaku no Akichi" |
| 11. | "Nichijō" |
| 12. | "Sayuringo Boshūchū" (さゆりんご募集中) |
| 13. | "Gorgonzola" (ゴルゴンゾーラ) |
| 14. | "Tokitoki Mekimeki" (トキトキメキメキ) |
| 15. | "Mirai no Kotae" (未来の答え) |

=== First press limited edition ===
CD
| No. | Title | Length |
|---|---|---|
| 1. | "Arigachi na Renai" (ありがちな恋愛) |
| 2. | "Nigemizu" (逃げ水) |
| 3. | "Itsuka Dekiru kara Kyō Dekiru" (いつかできるから今日できる) |
| 4. | "Synchronicity" (シンクロニシティ) |
| 5. | "Jikochu de Ikō!" (ジコチューで行こう!) |
| 6. | "Kaerimichi wa Tōmawari Shitaku Naru" (帰り道は遠回りしたくなる) |
| 7. | "Under" (アンダー) |
| 8. | "My rule" |
| 9. | "Atarashiisekai" (新しい世界) |
| 10. | "Sankaku no Akichi" (三角の空き地) |
| 11. | "Nichijō" (日常) |
| 12. | "Moshi Kimi ga Inakereba" (もし君がいなければ) |
| 13. | "Kiss no Syuriken" (キスの手裏剣) |
| 14. | "Against" |
| 15. | "Tsudzuku" (つづく) |

=== Regular edition ===
CD
| No. | Title | Length |
|---|---|---|
| 1. | "Arigachi na Renai" |
| 2. | "Nigemizu" |
| 3. | "Itsuka Dekiru kara Kyō Dekiru" |
| 4. | "Synchronicity" |
| 5. | "Jikochu de Ikō!" |
| 6. | "Kaerimichi wa Tōmawari Shitaku Naru" |
| 7. | "Under" |
| 8. | "My rule" |
| 9. | "Atarashiisekai" |
| 10. | "Sankaku no Akichi" |
| 11. | "Nichijō" |
| 12. | "Mōsugu〜Zambi Densetsu〜" (もうすぐ〜ザンビ伝説〜) |
| 13. | "Caravan wa Nemuranai" (キャラバンは眠らない) |
| 14. | "Live Sin" (ライブ神) |
| 15. | "Jibunjya nai Kanji" (自分じゃない感じ) |

== Charts ==
=== Weekly charts ===
Weekly chart performance for Ima ga Omoide ni Naru made
| Chart (2019) | Peak position |
|---|---|
| Japan (Billboard Japan Hot Albums) | 1 |
| Japan (Billboard Japan Top Albums Sales) | 1 |
| Japan (Oricon Albums Chart) | 1 |

=== Year-end charts ===
Year-end chart performance for Ima ga Omoide ni Naru made
| Chart (2019) | Position |
|---|---|
| Worldwide Albums (IFPI) | 14 |

== Sales ==
| Country | Chart | Sales |
|---|---|---|
| Japan | Oricon Albums Chart | 511,000 |
