= Kimi ni Shikarareta =

2021 single by Nogizaka46

- Regular edition cover

Single by Nogizaka46

from the album Time Flies
- B-side: "Yasashii Dake Nara"; "Machine-Gun Rain" (Type-A); "Moshimo Kokoro ga Tōmei Nara" (Type-B); "Watashi no Iro" (Type-C); "Dorodarake" (Type-D); "Tanin no Sora ni" (Regular)
- Released: September 22, 2021
- Recorded: 2021
- Genre: J-pop
- Length: 4:24
- Label: N46Div.; Sony Music Japan
- Composer: Youth Case
- Lyricist: Yasushi Akimoto

Nogizaka46 singles chronology
"Gomen ne Fingers Crossed" (2021)	"Kimi ni Shikarareta" (2021)	"Saigo no Tight Hug" (2021)

Music video
- "Kimi ni Shikarareta" on YouTube

"Kimi ni Shikarareta" (君に叱られた; lit. "You Scolded Me") is a song recorded by Japanese idol girl group Nogizaka46. It was released on September 22, 2021, through N46Div, marked as the group's twenty-eighth single. The song was written by Yasushi Akimoto and Youth Case about the importance of a scolding person. Haruka Kaki performed at the center position. Kazumi Takayama, Ranze Terada, Erika Ikuta, Mai Shinuchi and Minami Hoshino participated as their last single with the group.

== Background and release ==
Following the 27th single, "Gomen ne Fingers Crossed" released a month earlier, Nogizaka46 announced the release of a new single on July 14, 2021, during the first day of the 2021 Summer National Tour in Osaka. It was scheduled for release on September 22, after celebrating the 10th anniversary of the group. Participating members was announced in the group's television show Nogizaka Under Construction on August 15. On August 26, the single's title "Kimi ni Shikarareta" was announced, and the full-length song was aired for the first time at Tokyo FM's radio show School of Lock! in the part of Nogizaka Lock!, in which the center Haruka Kaki is a regular cast, and announced track listing on the following day. The song was performed for the first time on August 28 at FNS Laugh & Music: Uta to Warai no Saiten.

The CD single was set to be released in four limited editions: Type-A, Type-B, Type-C, and Type-D, and a regular edition. The single's special edition was released to digital music and streaming platforms on September 15. The cover artworks were designed by Kira Shintarō and taken by Kohga Mori, show the members as Goddesses playing in a fantastic field where insects live.

=== B-sides ===
"Tanin no Sora ni" (他人のそら似) was unveiled and performed for the first time by Nogizaka46's all members on August 22, 2021, for celebrating the 10th anniversary of the group on the first day of Fukuoka's Summer National Tour 2021, later included on the regular edition of the single. The other B-side songs were announced on August 27: sub-unit tracks "Yasashii Dake Nara" (やさしいだけなら) in all editions, "Moshimo Kokoro ga Tōmei Nara" (もしも心が透明なら) in Type-B, "Dorodarake" (泥だらけ) in Type-D, under members' track "Machine-Gun Rain" (マシンガンレイン) in Type-A, and Kazumi Takayama's graduation song "Watashi no Iro" (私の色) in Type-C. "Watashi no Iro" was unveil on September 1 at the radio show Nogizaka46 no All Night Nippon. "Moshimo Kokoro ga Tōmei Nara" was aired for the first time on September 12 at the radio show Radirer! Sunday. "Yasashii Dake Nara" was performed for the first time on YouTube program The First Take on September 22.

== Composition and lyrics ==
"Kimi ni Shikarareta" was written lyrics by Yasushi Akimoto, and composed by Youth Case. Lyrically, Haruka Kaki, a member who serves as the center position of the song, described the song makes listeners realize the importance of a scolding person, and want to thank the people who have the kindness of scolding. She also said that the melody is bright and refreshing, and it makes the listener feel cheerful. The song was composed in the key of F Major, 133 beats per minute with a running time of 3 minutes and 40 seconds.

== Commercial performance ==
"Kimi ni Shikarareta" debut at number one on the Oricon Singles Chart, dated October 4, 2021, selling 535,794 copies in the first week, making the 27th consecutive number-one single since their second single "Oide Shampoo". For Billboard Japan, the song entered at number 32 on the Japan Hot 100 for the date issue of September 27 while digital release, and jumped to number one in the next week due to physical release, selling 658,176 copies.

"Kimi ni Shikarareta" was certified triple platinum for physical release by the Recording Industry Association of Japan (RIAJ) on October 8, surpassing 750,000 copies.

== Music video ==
The music video of "Kimi ni Shikarareta" was premiered on September 2, 2021, to their online program Nogizaka46 Minutes, and uploaded on their official YouTube channel on the same day. Directed by Mitsunori Yokobori, the music video was shot at the studios in Tokyo, Yokohama, and Hamamatsu in early July. It is based on the motif of Cinderella and the story set in a fictitious film festival with the concept "anyone can be a heroine".

It begins with Kazumi Takayama was writing something. The story is about Sakura Endō, who is a staff in the film festival has forgotten the "glass shoes", which is an award for the festival. So Endō asked Haruka Kaki, who lives together, to deliver it to her, and Kaki ran to get the "glass shoes" to Endō. It concludes with Takayama leaves the book titled Nogizaka46 in Japanese and left the room at the end.

=== B-sides ===
The music video "Dorodarake" was uploaded on September 7, 2021. It was directed by Nozumi Hayashi and taken in Chiba Prefecture. The music video was created based on the concept "people who are not happy at life feel the joy of life only when they are in a band." The members who participated in the song also play the role of members of the band: Shiori Kubo and Mizuki Yamashita as vocalists, Sakura Endō as guitarist, Ayame Tsutsui as bassist, Maaya Wada as keyboardist, and Asuka Saitō as drummer.

The music video "Machine-Gun Rain" and "Watashi no Iro" were released on September 9. "Machine-Gun Rain" was directed by Denki Imahara and shot in Makuhari, Chiba Prefecture, with a three primary color of light concept. "Watashi no Iro" was directed by Yūsuke Koroyasu in Tachikawa, Tokyo. Kazumi Takayama, who sang the song attended her friend's wedding ceremony, shows her kindness and humanity of the caring person, and the video flashback to her memory in Nogizaka46.

"Moshimo Kokoro ga Tōmei Nara" music video was uploaded on September 17. Directed by Takurō Ōkubo, and shot in Matsumoto, Nagano in late July, The whole music video consisted mostly of dance.

== Track listing ==
Credits adapted from Tidal, and Sony Music. All lyrics are written by Yasushi Akimoto, except off vocal (instrumental) version tracks.

=== Limited edition ===
Type-A – CD
No.	Title	Music	Arrangement	Length
1.	"Kimi ni Shikarareta" (君に叱られた)	Youth Case	Tomoki Ishizuka	4:24
2.	"Yasashii Dake Nara" (やさしいだけなら)	Nobuaki Hiraga	Yūichi "Masa" Nonaka	4:07
3.	"Machine-Gun Rain" (マシンガンレイン)	Cotton	Cotton	4:09
4.	"Kimi ni Shikarareta" (off vocal version)	Youth Case	Ishizuka	4:24
5.	"Yasashii Dake Nara" (off vocal version)	Hiraga	Nonaka	4:07
6.	"Machine-Gun Rain" (off vocal version)	Cotton	Cotton	4:08

Type-A – Blu-ray
No.	Title	Director(s)	Length
1.	"Kimi ni Shikarareta" (music video)	Mitsunori Yokobori	5:15
2.	"Machine-Gun Rain" (music video)	Denki Imahara	4:19
3.	"Documentary of Ranze Terada"

Type-B – CD
No.	Title	Music	Arrangement	Length
1.	"Kimi ni Shikarareta"	Youth Case	Ishizuka	4:24
2.	"Yasashii Dake Nara"	Hiraga	Nonaka	4:07
3.	"Moshimo Kokoro ga Tōmei Nara" (もしも心が透明なら)	Katsuhiko Yamamoto	Yamamoto; Naoki "Naotyu" Chiba	4:33
4.	"Kimi ni Shikarareta" (off vocal version)	Youth Case	Ishizuka	4:24
5.	"Yasashii Dake Nara" (off vocal version)	Hiraga	Nonaka	4:07
6.	"Moshimo Kokoro ga Tōmei Nara" (off vocal version)	Yamamoto	Yamamoto; Chiba	4:32

Type-B – Blu-ray
No.	Title	Director(s)	Length
1.	"Kimi ni Shikarareta" (music video)	Yokobori	5:15
2.	"Moshimo Kokoro ga Tōmei Nara" (music video)	Takurō Ōkubo	4:58
3.	"Documentary of Momoko Ōzono"

Type-C – CD
No.	Title	Music	Arrangement	Length
1.	"Kimi ni Shikarareta"	Youth Case	Ishizuka	4:24
2.	"Yasashii Dake Nara"	Hiraga	Nonaka	4:07
3.	"Watashi no Iro" (私の色)	YSU	YSU	4:58
4.	"Kimi ni Shikarareta" (off vocal version)	Youth Case	Ishizuka	4:24
5.	"Yasashii Dake Nara" (off vocal version)	Hiraga	Nonaka	4:07
6.	"Watashi no Iro" (off vocal version)	YSU	YSU	4:57

Type-C – Blu-ray
No.	Title	Director(s)	Length
1.	"Kimi ni Shikarareta" (music video)	Yokobori	5:15
2.	"Watashi no Iro" (music video)	Yūsuke Koroyasu	6:32
3.	"Documentary of Kazumi Takayama"

Type-D – CD
No.	Title	Music	Arrangement	Length
1.	"Kimi ni Shikarareta"	Youth Case	Ishizuka	4:24
2.	"Yasashii Dake Nara"	Hiraga	Nonaka	4:07
3.	"Dorodarake" (泥だらけ)	Cotton	Cotton	3:44
4.	"Kimi ni Shikarareta" (off vocal version)	Youth Case	Ishizuka	4:24
5.	"Yasashii Dake Nara" (off vocal version)	Hiraga	Nonaka	4:07
6.	"Dorodarake" (off vocal version)	Cotton	Cotton	3:43

Type-D – Blu-ray
No.	Title	Director(s)	Length
1.	"Kimi ni Shikarareta" (music video)	Yokobori	5:15
2.	"Dorodarake" (music video)	Nozumi Hayashi	5:46
3.	"Making of 28th Single"
4.	"Making of 28th Single 2"
5.	"Making of 28th Single 3"
6.	"Making of 28th Single 4"
7.	"Making of 28th Single 5"

=== Regular edition ===
Regular edition – CD
No.	Title	Music	Arrangement	Length
1.	"Kimi ni Shikarareta"	Youth Case	Ishizuka	4:24
2.	"Yasashii Dake Nara"	Hiraga	Nonaka	4:07
3.	"Tanin no Sora ni" (他人のそら似)	Youth Case	Hirofumi Sasaki	4:43
4.	"Kimi ni Shikarareta" (off vocal version)	Youth Case	Youth Case	4:24
5.	"Yasashii Dake Nara" (off vocal version)	Hiraga	Nonaka	4:07
6.	"Tanin no Sora ni" (off vocal version)	Youth Case	Sasaki	4:42

=== Special edition ===
Special edition – digital download, streaming
No.	Title	Music	Arrangement	Length
1.	"Kimi ni Shikarareta"	Youth Case	Ishizuka	4:24
2.	"Yasashii Dake Nara"	Hiraga	Nonaka	4:07
3.	"Machine-Gun Rain"	Cotton	Cotton	4:09
4.	"Moshimo Kokoro ga Tōmei Nara"	Yamamoto	Yamamoto; Chiba	4:33
5.	"Watashi no Iro"	YSU	YSU	4:58
6.	"Dorodarake"	Cotton	Cotton	3:44
7.	"Tanin no Sora ni"	Youth Case	Sasaki	4:43
Total length:				30:38

== Participating members ==
The 21 members were selected to be participating (senbatsu) members for "Kimi ni Shikarareta", and 12 members for fukujin (first and second-row members). Haruka Kaki was selected as a center position for the first time. Sayaka Kakehashi was selected to participate for the first time. Ayane Suzuki and Hinako Kitano were selected to participate for the first time since the 23rd single "Sing Out!", and 25th single "Shiawase no Hogoshoku", respectively. Kazumi Takayama, Ranze Terada, Erika Ikuta, and Mai Shinuchi participate as their last single from the group.

- Third row: Hina Higuchi, Seira Hayakawa, Rei Seimiya, Hinako Kitano, Renka Iwamoto, Ayane Suzuki, Mayu Tamura, Mai Shinuchi, Sayaka Kakehashi
- Second row: Ayame Tsutsui, Minami Umezawa, Minami Hoshino, Kazumi Takayama, Erika Ikuta, Shiori Kubo, Manatsu Akimoto
- First row: Sakura Endō, Yūki Yoda, Haruka Kaki (center), Asuka Saitō, Mizuki Yamashita

=== B-sides ===
"Yasashii Dake Nara"

- Erika Ikuta
- Haruka Kaki
- Shiori Kubo

"Moshimo Kokoro ga Tōmei Nara"

- Minami Umezawa
- Reno Nakamura
- Seira Hayakawa
- Miyu Matsuo

"Watashi no Iro"

- Kazumi Takayama

"Machine-Gun Rain"

- Nao Yumiki
- Yuna Shibata
- Ranze Terada (center)
- Reno Nakamura
- Rena Yamazaki
- Miyu Matsuo
- Runa Hayashi
- Tamami Sakaguchi
- Saya Kanagawa
- Rika Satō
- Kaeda Satō
- Riria Itō
- Haruka Kuromi
- Mio Yakubo
- Maaya Wada
- Yuri Kitagawa
- Ayano Christie Yoshida
- Hazuki Mukai

"Dorodarake"

- Sakura Endō
- Shiori Kubo
- Asuka Saitō
- Ayame Tsutsui
- Mizuki Yamashita
- Maya Waada

"Tanin no Sora ni"

- All Nogizaka46 members

== Charts ==
=== Weekly charts ===
Chart performance for "Kimi ni Shikarareta"
Chart (2021)	Peak position
Japan (Japan Hot 100)	1
Japan (Oricon)	1
Japan Combined Singles (Oricon)	1
Japanese Digital Albums (Oricon)	2

=== Monthly charts ===
Monthly chart performance for "Kimi ni Shikarareta"
Chart (2021)	Peak position
Japan (Oricon)	1

=== Year-end charts ===
Year-end chart performance for "Kimi ni Shikarareta"
Chart (2021)	Position
Japan Top Singles Sales (Billboard Japan)	5
Japan (Oricon)	7

== Certifications ==
Sales certifications for "Kimi ni Shikarareta"
Region	Certification	Certified units/sales
Japan (RIAJ)	3× Platinum	750,000^{^}
^{^} Shipments figures based on certification alone.

== Release history ==
Release dates and formats for "Kimi ni Shikarareta"
Country	Date	Format	Version	Catalog number	Label	Ref.
Various	September 15, 2021	Digital download; streaming	Special	—N/a	N46Div.; Sony Music Japan	
Japan	September 22, 2021	CD+Blu-ray	Type-A	SRCL-11880–11881	N46Div.; Sony Music Japan	
Japan	September 22, 2021	CD+Blu-ray	Type-B	SRCL-11882–11883	N46Div.; Sony Music Japan	
Japan	September 22, 2021	CD+Blu-ray	Type-C	SRCL-11884–11885	N46Div.; Sony Music Japan	
Japan	September 22, 2021	CD+Blu-ray	Type-D	SRCL-11886–11887	N46Div.; Sony Music Japan	
Japan	September 22, 2021	CD	Regular	SRCL-11888	N46Div.; Sony Music Japan	

== See also ==
- List of Oricon number-one singles of 2021
- List of Hot 100 number-one singles of 2021 (Japan)
