= Saigo no Tight Hug =

Single by Nogizaka46

from the album Time Flies
- Language: Japanese
- Released: November 5, 2021
- Genre: J-pop
- Length: 4:55
- Label: N46Div.; Sony Music Japan
- Composer: Katsuhiko Sugiyama
- Lyricist: Yasushi Akimoto
- Producer: Yasushi Akimoto

Nogizaka46 singles chronology
"Kimi ni Shikarareta" (2021)	"Saigo no Tight Hug" (2021)	"Actually..." (2022)

Music video
- "Saigo no Tight Hug" on YouTube

"Saigo no Tight Hug" (最後のTight Hug; lit. "Last tight hug") is a song recorded by Japanese idol girl group Nogizaka46. It was released on November 5, 2021, through N46Div., and Sony Music Records, as a lead single of their first compilation album Time Flies. Erika Ikuta, who graduated from the group on December 31, 2021, serves as the center position of the song.

== Background and release ==
On October 10, 2021, Nogizaka46 announced their 10-year-anniversary compilation album, scheduled for release on December 15, titled Time Flies. Three days after the announcement, Erika Ikuta, a first generation member announced to graduate from the group on December 31 on her official blog. She said the compilation album would be the last record from Nogizaka46 that she will appear in. Along with the single, her own solo graduation song, "Toki no Wadachi" appears on the album.

"Saigo no Tight Hug" was announced on October 29 as the album's lead single. Erika Ikuta, who at the time, was graduating from the group, serves as the center position of the song. It scheduled for release on November 5 to digital music and streaming platforms. The full song was aired for the first time on Nogizaka46's All Night Nippon on November 3.

== Composition and lyrics ==
"Saigo no Tight Hug" was written by Yasushi Akimoto. Katsuhiko Sugiyama was in charge of sole composition and co-arrangement with Manabu Yachi. It was composed in the key of F Major, 119 beats per minute with a running time of 4 minutes and 55 seconds. Writing for Real Sound, Akihiro Watanabe described the song as a "the-warmth-lives-together-with-the-sadness" feeling to hug and send Ikuta off, with an acoustic guitar transforming to an organ-like synthesizer.

== Music video ==
An accompanying music video for "Saigo no Tight Hug" was released on November 16, 2021. Directed by Kazuma Ikeda, the music video was shot for two days at Nagano Prefecture around mid-October 2021. With the village festival theme, it conveys the feeling of Ikuta, who will leave the village, with the expression of dancing and tight hugs instead of words. According to Ikeda, the visuals of the music video were inspired by the films Midsommar (2019), Donkey Skin (1970), and Dreams (1990).

== Live performance ==
Nogizaka46 gave a debut performance of "Saigo no Tight Hug" at YTV's Best Hits Kayosai on November 11, 2021, alongside "Gomen ne Fingers Crossed". They performed the song at TBS's CDTV Live! Live! on November 15, filmed at Tokyo National Museum, where they are currently exhibiting the group's Shunkashūtō / Four Season Nogizaka46, alongside the special medley, titled Shunkashūtō Medley, consisting of "Harujion ga Sakukoro", "Jikochū de Ikō!", "Ima, Hanashitai Dareka ga Iru", and "Kaerimichi wa Tōmawari Shitaku Naru". On November 17, the group performed the song as part of the medley with "Guruguru Curtain", "Girls' Rule", "Synchronicity", and "Hadashi de Summer" on Nippon TV's Best Artist 2021, as well as Shibuya Note on November 27. The group performed the song at Fuji TV's FNS Music Festival on December 8, alongside Ikuta and Yuki Saito's collaboration "Sotsugyō".

Nogizaka46 members Ikuta, Hina Higuchi, Shiori Kubo, Sakura Endō, and Haruka Kaki appeared on MTV's MTV Unplugged on December 11, performed "Saigo no Tight Hug" in piano version. "Saigo no Tight Hug" at MTV Video Music Awards Japan 2021: The Live on December 18, alongside "Influencer", and "Synchronicity". The group performed the song at the 6-hour special edition of TV Asahi's Music Station, titled Music Station Ultra Super Live 2021 on December 24, as well as Buzz Rhythm 02 on the same day along with "Sing Out!".

== Participating members ==
3rd Row: Sakura Endō, Rei Seimiya, Sayaka Kakehashi, Ayame Tsutsui, Seira Hayakawa, Mayu Tamura, Haruka Kaki

2nd Row: Renka Iwamoto, Yūki Yoda, Minami Umezawa, Mai Shinuchi, Mizuki Yamashita, Shiori Kubo

1st Row: Hinako Kitano, Hina Higuchi, Asuka Saitō, Erika Ikuta (centre), Manatsu Akimoto, Minami Hoshino, Ayane Suzuki

== Charts ==
Chart performance for "Saigo no Tight Hug"
Chart (2021)	Peak position
Japan Download Songs (Billboard Japan)	14
Japan Digital Singles (Oricon)	15

== Release history ==
Release dates and formats for "Saigo no Tight Hug"
Region	Date	Format	Label	Ref.
Various	November 5, 2021	Digital download; streaming	N46Div.; Sony Music Japan	
