= List of Oricon number-one singles of 2021 =

The following is a list of Oricon number-one singles of 2021.

== Chart history ==
Issue date	Song	Artist(s)	Ref.
January 4	"Beautiful / Chinchaumakka / Canaria"	NEWS	
January 11	"Step and a Step"	NiziU	
January 18	"Photograph"	Poppin'Party	
January 25	"Shukan Umakuiku Yobi"	Johnny's West	
February 1	"Grandeur"	Snow Man	
February 8	"Boku wa Boku o Suki ni Naru"	Nogizaka46	
February 15	"Koiochi Flag"	SKE48	
February 22	"Kimi to Mitai Sekai"	Kanjani Eight	
March 1	"Boku ga Boku Janai Mitai da"	SixTones	
March 8	"Luv Bias"	Kis-My-Ft2	
March 15	"Gekikara Love / Now Now Ningen / Konna Hazu ja Nakatta!"	Beyooooonds	
March 22	"Roar"	KAT-TUN	
March 29	"Dream on the Street"	Da Pump	
April 5	"Let's Music"	Sexy Zone	
April 12	"Breaking Dawn"	Jaejoong	
April 19	"Take a Picture / Poppin' Shakin'"	NiziU	
April 26	"Ban"	Sakurazaka46	
May 3	"Hitori Janai"	Seventeen	
May 10	Challenger ("Born to Be Wild")	JO1	
May 17	"Something New"	Johnny's West	
May 24	"Negative Fighter"	Hey! Say! JUMP	
May 31	"Magic Touch / Beating Hearts"	King & Prince	
June 7	"Kimi Shika Katan"	Hinatazaka46	
June 14	"Bokura wa Mada / Magic Carpet Ride"	V6	
June 21	"Gomen ne Fingers Crossed"	Nogizaka46	
June 28	"Pale Blue"	Kenshi Yonezu	
July 5	"Hitori ni Shinai yo"	Kanjani Eight	
July 12	"Burn"	NEWS	
July 19	Border: Hakanai ("Given-Taken")	Enhypen	
July 26	"Hello Hello"	Snow Man	
August 2	"Un/Pair"	KinKi Kids	
August 9	"Dekkai Ai / Kido Airaku"	Johnny's West	
August 16	"Natsu no Hydrangea"	Sexy Zone	
August 23	"Mascara"	SixTones	
August 30	Stranger ("Real")	JO1	
September 6	"Gunjo Runaway"	Hey! Say! JUMP	
September 13	"Ano Koro no Kimi wo Mitsuketa"	SKE48	
September 20	"We Just Go Hard" feat. AK-69/"Euphoria"	KAT-TUN	
September 27	"Fear / So Blue"	Kis-My-Ft2	
October 4	"Kimi ni Shikarareta"	Nogizaka46	
October 11	"Nemohamo Rumor"	AKB48	
October 18	"Koi Furu Tsukiyo ni Kimi Omou"	King & Prince	
October 25	"Nagaredama"	Sakurazaka46	
November 1	"Hetare Tachi yo"	STU48	
November 8	"Tteka"	Hinatazaka46	
November 15	A ("Rocketeer"/"Brighter")	INI	
November 22	"Ubu Love"	Naniwa Danshi	
November 29	"Mirai e / ReBorn"	NEWS	
December 6	"Sing-Along"	Hey! Say! JUMP	
December 13	"Secret Touch"	Snow Man	
December 20	"Ai no Chikara"	Seventeen	
December 27	Wandering ("Bokura no Kisetsu" / "Prologue")	JO1	

== See also ==
- List of Oricon number-one albums of 2021
