= Boku wa Boku o Suki ni Naru =

2021 single by Nogizaka46

- Regular edition cover

Single by Nogizaka46

from the album Time Flies
- B-side: "Ashita ga Aru Riyū"; "Wilderness World" (Type-A); "Kuchi Hodo ni mo Nai Kiss" (Type-B); "Tsumetai Mizu no Naka" (Type-C); "Out of the Blue" (Type-D); "Yūjō Pierce" (Regular)
- Released: January 27, 2021
- Recorded: 2020
- Genre: J-pop
- Length: 4:51
- Label: N46Div.; Sony Music Japan
- Composer: Katsuhiko Sugiyama
- Lyricist: Yasushi Akimoto
- Producer: Yasushi Akimoto (exec.)

Nogizaka46 singles chronology
"Route 246" (2020)	"Boku wa Boku o Suki ni Naru" (2021)	"Gomen ne Fingers Crossed" (2021)

Music video
- "Boku wa Boku o Suki ni Naru" on YouTube "Boku wa Boku o Suki ni Naru" (anime ver.) on YouTube

"Boku wa Boku o Suki ni Naru" (Japanese: 僕は僕を好きになる; "I am Starting to Like Myself") is the 26th single by Japanese idol group Nogizaka46. It was released on January 27, 2021, through N46Div. The song was written by Yasushi Akimoto and composed by Katsuhiko Sugiyama about the transition of the human's mind until it is decided to start something with vocals which transparent to the melody of the piano and strings. Mizuki Yamashita served as the center position of the song for the first time, and Miona Hori also participated as her last single from the group.

It reached number-one on the weekly Oricon Singles Chart with 589,000 copies sold in the first week and number-one on the weekly Billboard Japan Hot 100, and also received a triple platinum certification by the Recording Industry Association of Japan.

== Background and release ==
Nogizaka46 announced the title of twenty sixth single "Boku wa Boku o Suki ni Naru" (僕は僕を好きになる) on November 13, 2020, and announced the participating members (senbatsu) in the group's television show Nogizaka Under Construction on November 15. It is the first physical music release in about 10 months from the previous single "Shiawase no Hogoshoku".

The physical single was released on January 27, 2021, in 4 limited editions: Type-A, Type-B, Type-C, and Type-D, and regular edition. The limited editions include the event participation ticket or special gift application ticket, and one raw photo. The limited edition's blu-ray disc also included individual promotional videos of fourth generation members in the theme "genius" (天才, tensai). The special edition was released on January 20 to digital music platform, before the physical release for a week.

== Composition ==
"Boku wa Boku o Suki ni Naru" is written lyrics by Yasushi Akimoto like Nogizaka46's other songs, and composed by Katsuhiko Sugiyama, who compose many songs for Nogizaka46 such as Seifuku no Mannequin, Kimi no Na wa Kibō, Sayonara no Imi, etc. The song's vocals are transparent to the melody of the piano and strings, and the lyrics depict the transition of the human's mind until it is decided to start something, and also expresses introspective lyrics with multiple choruses and delicate the unique sounds. Mizuki Yamashita, who is the center position of the single said the song's lyrics are a message for someone who has negative feelings or asks themselves, becoming positive feelings, giving a cheerful to someone who is worried or be not confident in themselves.

=== B-sides ===
There are 6 b-sides for the single "Boku wa Boku o Suki ni Naru". "Ashita ga Aru Riyū" (明日がある理由; "The Reason Why There is a Tomorrow") was included in every edition of the single. The song is composed by Yu-Jin, shows a message with easy-going words show about the importance of continuing with the piano accompaniment. "Wilderness World" (stylized in sentence case) from the limited edition Type-A is a powerful electronic dance music song which composed by Youth Case. The under members' track "Kuchi Hodo ni mo Nai Kiss" (口ほどにもないKISS; "Kiss That Just Talk Big") from the limited edition Type-B is a bright and refreshing song composed and arranged by Taisuke Nakamura.

The Miona Hori's solo track "Tsumetai Mizu no Naka" (冷たい水の中; "In Cold Water") from the limited Type-C is a song with relaxing and painful piano piece, composed by Hiroo Yamaguchi. The track from the limited edition Type-D sung by the fourth generation members, "Out of the Blue" (stylized in sentence case) is composed by Youth Case, who also composed "I See…", the fourth generation b-side in "Shiawase no Hogoshoku". It is an up-tempo and refreshing song with a light city pop sound that expresses the story of love that begins with a sudden development. The last track from the regular edition "Yūjō Pierce" (友情ピアス, Yūjō Piasu; "Friendship Pierced Earring") was sung by Momoko Ōzono and Sakura Endō, is a warm and folky song composed by Michio Kawano.

== Commercial performance ==
"Boku wa Boku o Suki ni Naru" debuted at number 1 on the first week of Oricon Singles Chart for the chart issue date of February 8, 2021, selling 589,338 copies, recorded as the 25th single in a row since the group's 2nd single, "Oide Shampoo", while the digital platform, the song was sold 7,068 single digital units, and 4,579 digital album units for the chart issue date of February 2, 2021. The song also peaked at number 1 on the Billboard Japan Hot 100 and number 1 on the Top Single Sales chart, selling 678,684 copies for the chart issue date of February 8, 2021.

On February 10, 2021, "Boku wa Boku o Suki ni Naru" received a triple platinum certification from the Recording Industry Association of Japan (RIAJ), denoting shipments of 750,000 copies.

== Music video ==
The music video "Boku wa Boku o Suki ni Naru" was released on January 8, 2021. It was directed by Hiroshi Okuyama and choreographed by Seishiro. Their shot in several places around Tokyo in late November last year. The music video shows the life-sized idol in various scenes, such as singing performances as singers and work scenes as actresses and models, based on the concept of "living figures" of members. In addition, the serious expression in the dance lesson scene where the practice scene was shot is also a highlight.

The anime version music video was also released on January 29, 2021, directed by Chiaki Kanno, written a story, storyboard, and illustrated by Sumito Ōwara, who wrote and illustrated a manga, Keep Your Hands Off Eizouken!. The story tells about a girl who belongs to the air bike club is the main character, and it is depicted that she works in school life and club activities while having a conflict with herself.

=== B-sides ===
The Miona Hori solo's music video "Tsumetai Mizu no Naka" was directed by Yūki Yamato, who also directed the movie starring Hori, Hot Gimmick: Girl Meets Boy. In the beginning, Hori looks back on the seven years since joining the group to ask herself, and then she performs in a sailor suit costume from the 7th single "Barrette" which she was selected as a participating member for the first time at the center position. She finally took off her sailor suit and expressed her intention to graduate (leave the group). It was released on the Nogizaka46 official YouTube channel on November 27, 2020, seven years after the release date of "Barrette", and Hori's graduation was announced at the end of the music video. It is unusual for members to announce their graduation in the music video, and this is the first time in the history of the group.

The music video "Wilderness World" was released on January 13, 2021. It was directed by Atsunori Tōshi and was shot in early October 2020, at the large open set of Shibuya Crossing at Ashikaga Scramble City Studio in Ashikaga, Tochigi, and in the Shibuya area such as Miyashita Park. It was set the members to challenge the battle with weapons according to the game content of Knives Out. In addition, the members also show dancing at the open set of Shibuya Crossing.

The under members' music video "Kuchi Hodo ni mo Nai Kiss" and The fourth generation members' music video "Out of the Blue" were released simultaneously on January 19, 2021. "Kuchi Hodo ni mo Nai Kiss" was directed by Yūsuke Koroyasu, was shot in early October 2020, at Lake Kawaguchi, Yamanashi Prefecture. The story tells about although the mansion is confused by the elopement of daughter and maid, it is a musical-like music video that tells the story that there was actually a guide behind the scenes. The music video includes the slapstick feeling, brightness, and fun in the one theme. While "Out of the Blue" was directed by N2B, was shot in early October 2020. The members started seriously throwing pillows at their accommodation the night before the music video was shot.

The music video "Yūjō Pierce" was released on February 18, 2021, directed by Hiroshi Takano at Shimokitazawa Shelter, Tokyo in early February. The music video shows Momoko Ōzono and Sakura Endō, who sang the song play the guitar together and talk about something during shooting.

== Live performances ==
The group performed "Boku wa Boku o Suki ni Naru" for the first time on November 25, 2020, in the Nippon TV's music program, Best Artist 2020, and performed the full song for the first time on December 21 in TBS's CDTV Live! Live! Christmas Special.

== Usage in media ==
"Boku wa Boku o Suki ni Naru" was used for Haruyama Trading's suit advertising campaign Any Scene for Ladies (どんなシーンでも篇 レディス). The B-side "Ashita ga Aru Riyū" was used as the theme song for Nippon TV's television program, Lion Special 40th All Japan High School Quiz Championship (ライオンスペシャル 第40回 全国高等学校クイズ選手権). "Wilderness World" was used as the theme song for the battle royale game, Knives Out (荒野行動).

== Track listing ==
Credits adapted from the official website, Tower Records Japan and Tidal. All lyrics are written by Yasushi Akimoto, expect off vocal (instrumental) version tracks.

=== Limited edition ===
==== Type-A ====
CD
No.	Title	Music	Arrangement	Length
1.	"Boku wa Boku o Suki ni Naru" (僕は僕を好きになる)	Katsuhiko Sugiyama	Sugiyama; Tsuyoshi Ishihara	4:51
2.	"Ashita ga Aru Riyū" (明日がある理由)	Yu-Jin	Yu-Jin	5:11
3.	"Wilderness World"	Youth Case	Hiroshi Kido; Youth Case	4:14
4.	"Boku wa Boku o Suki ni Naru" (off vocal version)	Sugiyama	Sugiyama; Ishihara	4:51
5.	"Ashita ga Aru Riyū" (off vocal version)	Yu-Jin	Yu-Jin	5:11
6.	"Wilderness World" (off vocal version)	Youth Case	Kido; Youth Case	4:14
Total length:				28:31

Blu-ray
No.	Title	Director	Length
1.	"Boku wa Boku o Suki ni Naru" (music video)	Hiroshi Okuyama	5:16
2.	"Wilderness World" (music video)	Atsunori Tōshi	5:22
3.	"Rei Seimiya: Reipen" (清宮レイ：REIPEN)	Katsuaki Ishii	5:35
4.	"Ayame Tsutsui: Seishun no Tensai" (筒井あやめ：青春の天才)	Shigeru Tsukita	7:00
5.	"Mio Yakubo: Mio Yakubo's Morning Routine" (矢久保美緒：Mio Yakubo's Morning Routine)	GOMES	7:05
6.	"Nao Yumiki: Nao, Shippai de wa Arimasen." (弓木奈於：なお、失敗ではありません。)	Shigeru Tsukita	7:04
Total length:			37:22

==== Type-B ====
CD
No.	Title	Music	Arrangement	Length
1.	"Boku wa Boku o Suki ni Naru"	Sugiyama	Sugiyama; Ishihara	4:51
2.	"Ashita ga Aru Riyū"	Yu-Jin	Yu-Jin	5:11
3.	"Kuchi Hodo ni mo Nai Kiss" (口ほどにもないKISS)	Daisuke Nakamura	Nakamura	3:41
4.	"Boku wa Boku o Suki ni Naru" (off vocal version)	Sugiyama	Sugiyama; Ishihara	4:51
5.	"Ashita ga Aru Riyū" (off vocal version)	Yu-Jin	Yu-Jin	5:11
6.	"Kuchi Hodo ni mo Nai Kiss" (off vocal version)	Nakamura	Nakamura	3:40
Total length:				27:25

Blu-ray
No.	Title	Director	Length
1.	"Boku wa Boku o Suki ni Naru" (music video)	Okuyama	5:16
2.	"Kuchi Hodo ni mo Nai Kiss" (music video)	Yūsuke Koroyasu	5:41
3.	"Haruka Kaki: Gekikara no Tensai" (賀喜遥香：激辛の天才)	Nozomu Hayashi	6:29
4.	"Yuri Kitagawa: Rational Girl" (北川悠理：ラショナルガール)	Sumito Ōwara	6:22
5.	"Haruka Kuromi: Tensai Nante," (黒見明香：天才なんて、)	Nao Suzuki	5:45
6.	"Miyu Matsuo: Hakanasa no Sekai" (松尾美佑：儚さの世界)	Akari Miyazu	5:15
Total length:			34:48

==== Type-C ====
CD
No.	Title	Music	Arrangement	Length
1.	"Boku wa Boku o Suki ni Naru"	Sugiyama	Sugiyama; Ishihara	4:51
2.	"Ashita ga Aru Riyū"	Yu-Jin	Yu-Jin	5:11
3.	"Tsumetai Mizu no Naka" (冷たい水の中)	Hiroo Yamaguchi	Yamaguchi	5:19
4.	"Boku wa Boku o Suki ni Naru" (off vocal version)	Sugiyama	Sugiyama; Ishihara	4:51
5.	"Ashita ga Aru Riyū" (off vocal version)	Yu-Jin	Yu-Jin	5:11
6.	"Tsumetai Mizu no Naka" (off vocal version)	Yamaguchi	Yamaguchi	5:17
Total length:				30:40

Blu-ray
No.	Title	Director	Length
1.	"Boku wa Boku o Suki ni Naru" (music video)	Okuyama	5:16
2.	"Tsumetai Mizu no Naka" (music video)	Yūki Yamato	7:55
3.	"Sakura Endō: Iya, Maji Tensai!" (遠藤さくら：いや、マジ天才！)	Masaya Suzuki	7:05
4.	"Yuna Shibata: Posing Queen" (柴田柚菜：POSING QUEEN)	Chiharu Shimura	5:08
5.	"Seira Hayakawa: Akantare Two Sissies" (早川聖来：あかんたれ Two sissies)	Kohei Inoue	7:07
6.	"Hayashi Runa: Hatsubai Enki (Kari) (Hayashi)" (林瑠奈：発売延期（仮）（林）)	Shuto Itō	6:53
Total length:			39:24

==== Type-D ====
CD
No.	Title	Music	Arrangement	Length
1.	"Boku wa Boku o Suki ni Naru"	Sugiyama	Sugiyama; Ishihara	4:51
2.	"Ashita ga Aru Riyū"	Yu-Jin	Yu-Jin	5:11
3.	"Out of the Blue"	Youth Case	Tomoo Ishizuka	4:32
4.	"Boku wa Boku o Suki ni Naru" (off vocal version)	Sugiyama	Sugiyama; Ishihara	4:51
5.	"Ashita ga Aru Riyū" (off vocal version)	Yu-Jin	Yu-Jin	5:11
6.	"Out of the Blue" (off vocal version)	Youth Case	Ishizuka	4:31
Total length:				29:07

Blu-ray
No.	Title	Director	Length
1.	"Boku wa Boku o Suki ni Naru" (music video)	Okuyama	5:16
2.	"Out of the Blue" (music video)	N2B	6:44
3.	"Sayaka Kakehashi: Kick the Crafty" (掛橋沙耶香：KICK THE CRAFTY)	Nozomi Ueda	7:03
4.	"Saya Kanagawa: Mina Tensai da Carnival!" (金川紗耶：みな天才だカーニバル！)	Eli Yoshikawa	8:54
5.	"Rika Satō: Hacker Girl" (佐藤璃果：HACKER GIRL)	Yūki Kamiya	7:06
6.	"Mayu Tamura: Watashi no Tensaitte Nani?" (田村真佑：ワタシの天才ってなに？)	Yūto Fukuhara	5:29
Total length:			40:32

=== Regular edition ===
CD
No.	Title	Music	Arrangement	Length
1.	"Boku wa Boku o Suki ni Naru"	Sugiyama	Sugiyama; Ishihara	4:51
2.	"Ashita ga Aru Riyū"	Yu-Jin	Yu-Jin	5:11
3.	"Yūjō Pierce" (友情ピアス)	Michio Kawano	Michio Kawano	3:33
4.	"Boku wa Boku o Suki ni Naru" (off vocal version)	Sugiyama	Sugiyama; Ishihara	4:51
5.	"Ashita ga Aru Riyū" (off vocal version)	Yu-Jin	Yu-Jin	5:11
6.	"Yūjō Pierce" (off vocal version)	Kawano	Kawano	3:32
Total length:				27:09

=== Special edition ===
Digital download, streaming
No.	Title	Music	Arrangement	Length
1.	"Boku wa Boku o Suki ni Naru"	Sugiyama	Sugiyama; Ishihara	4:51
2.	"Ashita ga Aru Riyū"	Yu-Jin	Yu-Jin	5:11
3.	"Wilderness World"	Youth Case	Kido; Youth Case	4:14
4.	"Kuchi Hodo ni mo Nai Kiss"	Nakamura	Nakamura	3:41
5.	"Tsumetai Mizu no Naka"	Yamaguchi	Yamaguchi	5:19
6.	"Out of the Blue"	Youth Case	Ishizuka	4:32
7.	"Yūjō Pierce"	Kawano	Kawano	3:33
Total length:				31:21

== Participating members ==
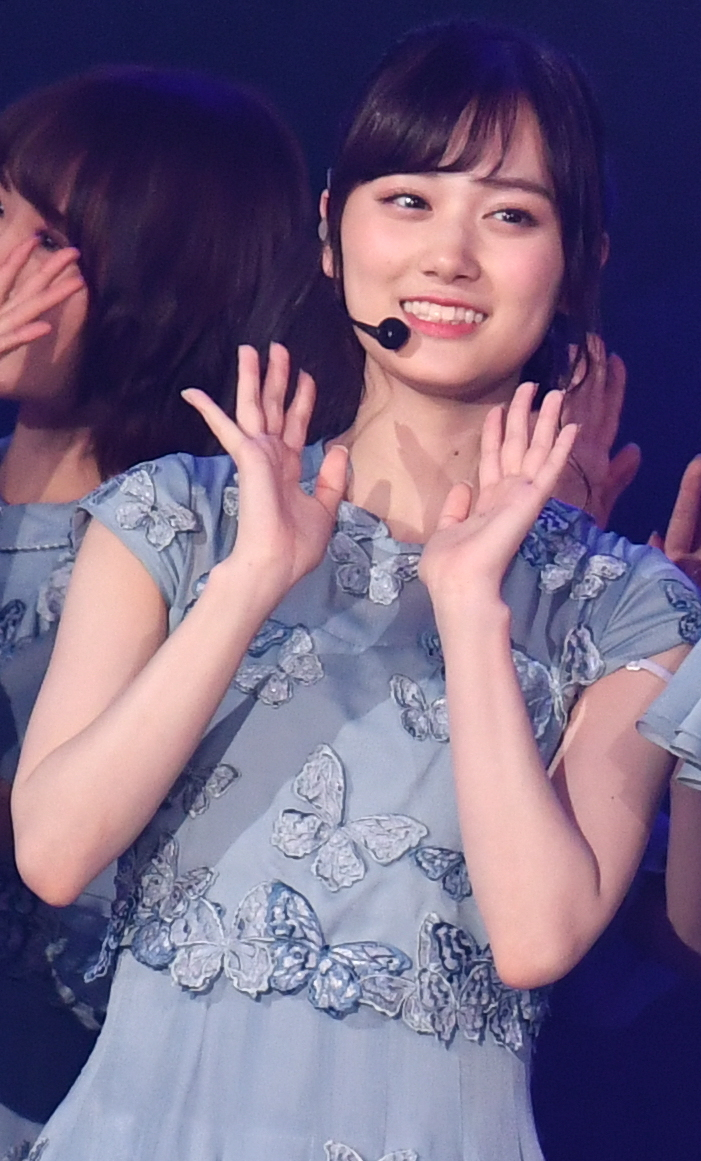
Mizuki Yamashita served as a center position for the first time for "Boku wa Boku o Suki ni Naru".

The 19 members were selected to be participating (senbatsu) members for "Boku wa Boku o Suki ni Naru", and 12 members for fukujin (first and second-row members). Mizuki Yamashita was served as the center position for the first time, and the second time from the third generation since the 17th single, "Nigemizu" which Momoko Ōzono and Yūki Yoda were served as the center position. Rei Seimiya and Mayu Tamura were selected to participate for the first time, and Hori Miona participated as her last single from the group.

- First generation: Manatsu Akimoto, Erika Ikuta, Asuka Saitō, Kazumi Takayama, Minami Hoshino, Sayuri Matsumura
- Second generation: Mai Shinuchi, Miona Hori
- Third generation: Renka Iwamoto, Minami Umezawa, Momoko Ōzono, Shiori Kubo, Mizuki Yamashita (center), Yūki Yoda
- Fourth generation: Sakura Endō, Haruka Kaki, Rei Seimiya, Mayu Tamura, Ayame Tsutsui

=== B-sides ===
==== "Ashita ga Aru Riyū" ====
The participating members are the same as the previous digital single "Route 246". Renka Iwamoto was served as the center position.

- First generation: Manatsu Akimoto, Erika Ikuta, Asuka Saitō, Kazumi Takayama, Minami Hoshino, Sayuri Matsumura
- Second generation: Hinako Kitano, Mai Shinuchi, Miona Hori
- Third generation: Renka Iwamoto (center), Minami Umezawa, Momoko Ōzono, Shiori Kubo, Mizuki Yamashita, Yūki Yoda
- Fourth generation: Sakura Endō, Haruka Kaki, Ayame Tsutsui

==== "Wilderness World" ====
The participating members are the same as "Boku wa Boku o Suki ni Naru". Asuka Saitō was served as the center position.

==== "Kuchi Hodo ni mo Nai Kiss" ====
The song is performed by members who not participate in main song (under members). Tamami Sakaguchi was served as the center position for the first time.

- First generation: Hina Higuchi, Maaya Wada
- Second generation: Junna Itō, Hinako Kitano, Ayane Suzuki, Ranze Terada, Rena Yamazaki, Miria Watanabe
- Third generation: Riria Itō, Tamami Sakaguchi (center), Kaeda Satō, Reno Nakamura, Hazuki Mukai, Ayano Christie Yoshida

==== "Tsumetai Mizu no Naka" ====
- Second generation: Miona Hori

==== "Out of the Blue" ====
The participating members are all fourth generation members. Seira Hayakawa was served as the center position for the first time.

- Fourth generation: Sakura Endō, Haruka Kaki, Sayaka Kakehashi, Saya Kanagawa, Yuri Kitagawa, Haruka Kuromi, Rika Satō, Yuna Shibata, Rei Seimiya, Mayu Tamura, Ayame Tsutsui, Seira Hayakawa (center), Runa Hayashi, Miyu Matsuo, Mio Yakubo, Nao Yumiki

==== "Yūjō Pierce" ====
- Third generation: Momoko Ōzono
- Fourth generation: Sakura Endō

== Credits and personnel ==
Credits adapted from Tidal. Track numbers are based on the special edition.

- Nogizaka46 – vocalist (all tracks)
- Yasushi Akimoto – lyricist (all tracks)
- Katsuhiko Sugiyama – composer (track 1), arranger (track 1)
- Tsuyoshi Ishihara – arranger (track 1)
- Yu-Jin – composer (track 2), arranger (track 2)
- Youth Case – composer (track 3, 6), arranger (track 3)
- Hiroshi Kido – arranger (track 3)
- Daisuke Nakamura – composer (track 4), arranger (track 4)
- Hiroo Yamaguchi – composer (track 5), arranger (track 5)
- Tomoo Ishizuka – arranger (track 6)
- Michio Kawano – composer (track 7), arranger (track 7)

== Accolades ==
Awards and nominations for "Boku wa Boku o Suki ni Naru"
Ceremony	Year	Award	Result	Ref.
Japan Gold Disc Award	2022	Best 5 Singles	Won	

== Charts ==
=== Weekly charts ===
Weekly chart performance for "Boku wa Boku o Suki ni Naru"
Chart (2021)	Peak position
Japan Hot 100 (Billboard)	1
Japan (Oricon)	1
Japan Combined Singles (Oricon)	1
Japan Digital Singles (Oricon)	11
Japanese Digital Albums (Oricon)	2

=== Monthly charts ===
Monthly chart performance for "Boku wa Boku o Suki ni Naru"
Chart (2021)	Position
Japan (Oricon)	2

=== Year-end charts ===
Year-end chart performance for "Boku wa Boku o Suki ni Naru"
Chart (2021)	Position
Japan (Japan Hot 100)	77
Japan (Oricon)	5

== Certifications ==
Sales certifications for "Boku wa Boku o Suki ni Naru"
Region	Certification	Certified units/sales
Japan (RIAJ)	3× Platinum	750,000^{^}
^{^} Shipments figures based on certification alone.

== Release history ==
Country	Date	Format	Label
Various	January 20, 2021	Digital download; streaming	N46Div.; Sony Music Japan
Japan	January 27, 2021	CD; Blu-ray	N46Div.; Sony Music Japan

== See also ==
- List of Oricon number-one singles of 2021
- List of Hot 100 number-one singles of 2021 (Japan)
