= List of Hot 100 number-one singles of 2021 (Japan) =

The following is a list of weekly number-one singles on the Billboard Japan Hot 100 chart in 2021.

== Chart history ==
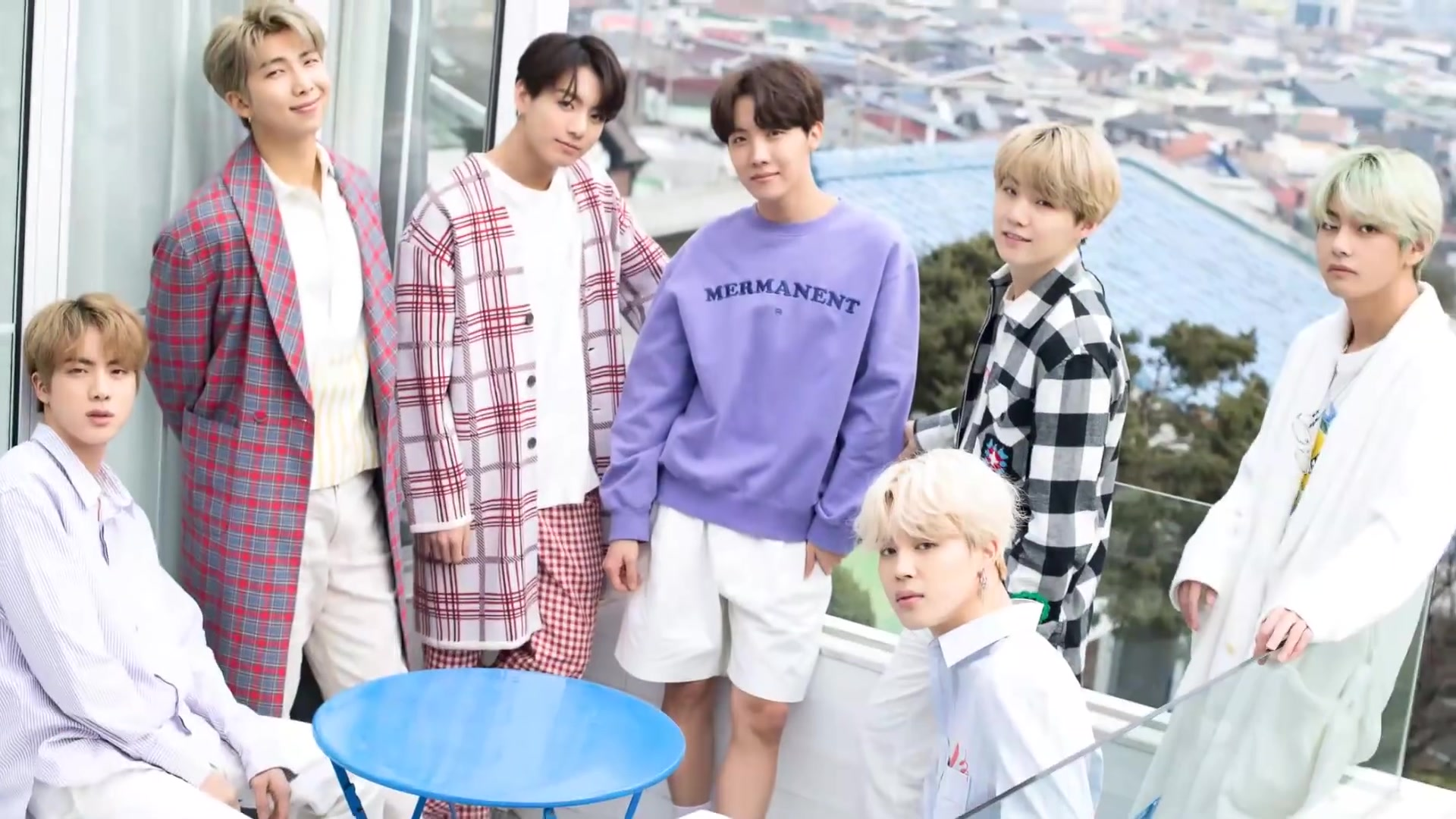
Butter" by BTS is the longest running number-one song of 2021, with four weeks atop the chart.

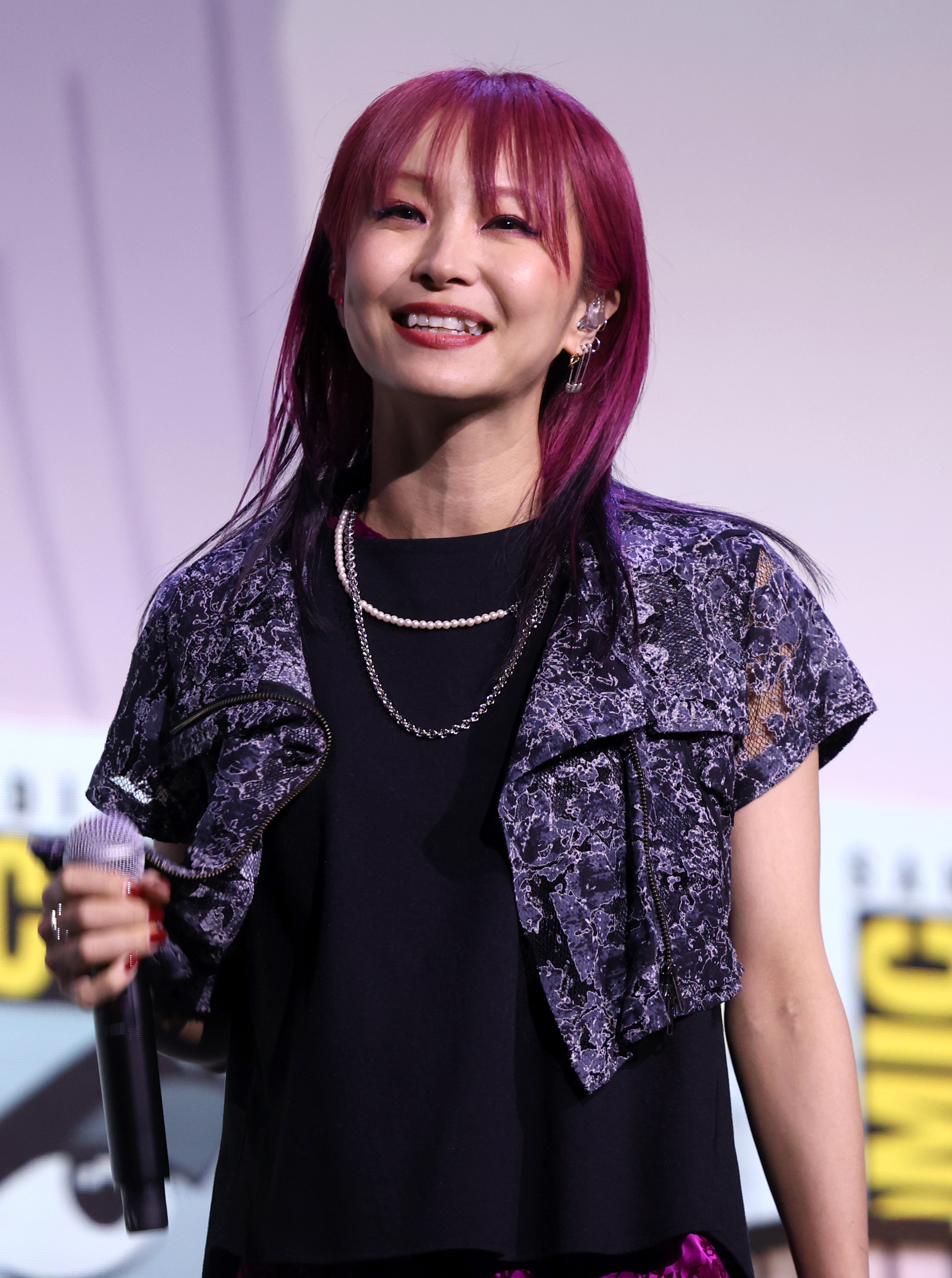
"Homura" by LiSA is the year's longest running number-one song by a solo artist, topping the chart for two weeks.

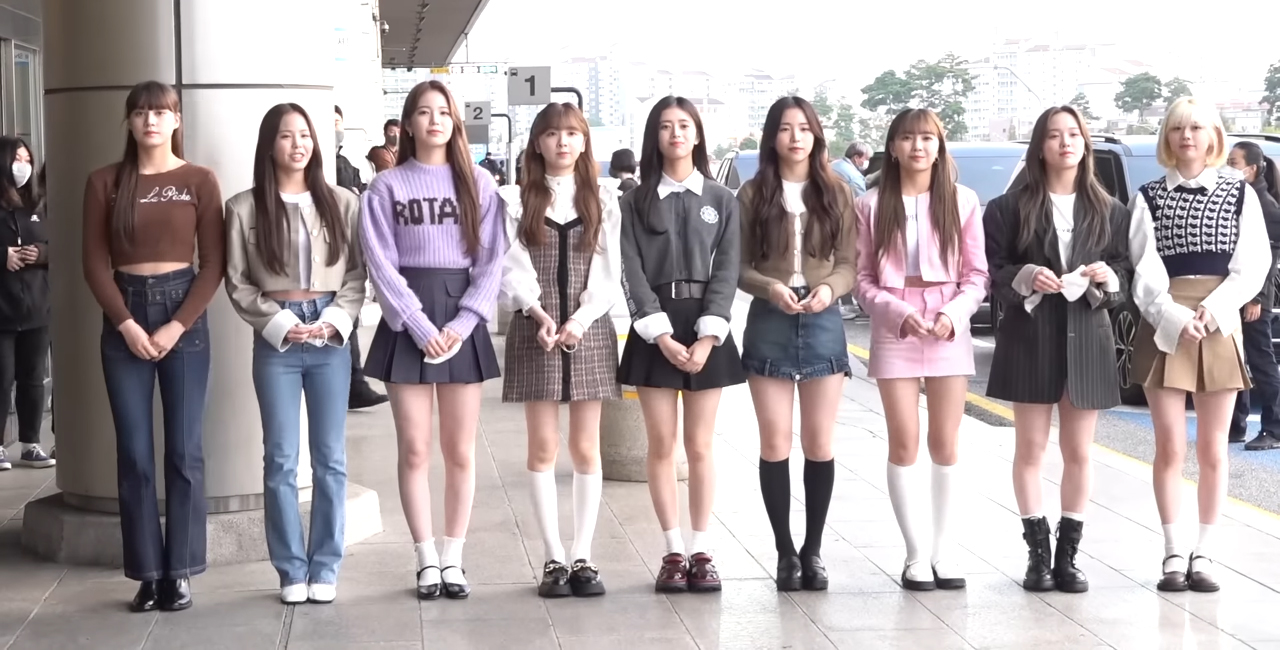
"Take a Picture" by NiziU is the year's longest running number-one song by a female group, topping the chart for two weeks.

Issue date	Song	Artist(s)	Ref.
January 4	"Beautiful"	NEWS	
January 11	"Homura"	LiSA	
January 18	"Homura"	LiSA	
January 25	"Shūkan Umakuiku Yōbi"	Johnny's West	
February 1	"Grandeur"	Snow Man	
February 8	"Boku wa Boku o Suki ni Naru"	Nogizaka46	
February 15	"Koiochi Flag"	SKE48	
February 22	"Kimi to Mitai Sekai"	Kanjani Eight	
March 1	"Boku ga Boku Janai Mitai da"	SixTones	
March 8	"Luv Bias"	Kis-My-Ft2	
March 15	"Usseewa"	Ado	
March 22	"Roar"	KAT-TUN	
March 29	"One Last Kiss"	Hikaru Utada	
April 5	"Let's Music"	Sexy Zone	
April 12	"Take a Picture"	NiziU	
April 19	"Take a Picture"	NiziU	
April 26	"Ban"	Sakurazaka46	
May 3	"Not Alone"	Seventeen	
May 10	'"Born to Be Wild"	JO1	
May 17	"Something New"	Johnny's West	
May 24	"Negative Fighter"	Hey! Say! JUMP	
May 31	"Magic Touch"	King & Prince	
June 7	"Butter"	BTS	
June 14	"Butter"	BTS	
June 21	"Gomen ne Fingers Crossed"	Nogizaka46	
June 28	"Pale Blue"	Kenshi Yonezu	
July 5	"Fushigi"	Gen Hoshino	
July 12	"Butter"	BTS	
July 19	"Butter"	BTS	
July 26	"Hello Hello"	Snow Man	
August 2	"Permission to Dance"	BTS	
August 9	"Dekkai Ai"	Johnny's West	
August 16	"Natsu no Hydrangea"	Sexy Zone	
August 23	"Mascara"	SixTones	
August 30	"Real"	JO1	
September 6	"Gunjō Runaway"	Hey! Say! JUMP	
September 13	"Ano Koro no Kimi o Mitsuketa"	SKE48	
September 20	"We Just Go Hard"	KAT-TUN feat. AK-69	
September 27	"Fear"	Kis-My-Ft2	
October 4	"Kimi ni Shikarareta"	Nogizaka46	
October 11	"Nemohamo Rumor"	AKB48	
October 18	"Koi Furu Tsukiyo ni Kimi Omou"	King & Prince	
October 25	"Nagaredama"	Sakurazaka46	
November 1	"Akeboshi"	LiSA	
November 8	"Tteka"	Hinatazaka46	
November 15	"Gifted"	Be First	
November 22	"Ubu Love"	Naniwa Danshi	
November 29	"Ubu Love"	Naniwa Danshi	
December 6	"Sing-Along"	Hey! Say! JUMP	
December 13	"Secret Touch"	Snow Man	
December 20	"Zankyosanka"	Aimer	
December 27	"Bokura no Kisetsu"	JO1	

== See also ==
- List of Billboard Japan Hot Albums number ones of 2021
