= Route 246 (song) =

2020 single by Nogizaka46

Single by Nogizaka46

from the album Time Flies
- Released: July 24, 2020 (Japan)
- Genre: J-pop; EDM
- Length: 3:52
- Label: N46Div.
- Composer: Tetsuya Komuro
- Lyricist: Yasushi Akimoto
- Producer: Yasushi Akimoto

Nogizaka46 singles chronology
"Sekaijū no Rinjin yo" (2020)	"Route 246" (2020)	"Boku wa Boku o Suki ni Naru" (2021)

Music video
- "Route 246" on YouTube

"Route 246" (pronounced "route two forty-six") is a song recorded by Japanese idol girl group Nogizaka46. It was released digitally on July 24, 2020, through N46Div. and Sony Music Records. It was written by Yasushi Akimoto and composed by Tetsuya Komuro. Asuka Saitō served as the center position of the song.

== Background and release ==
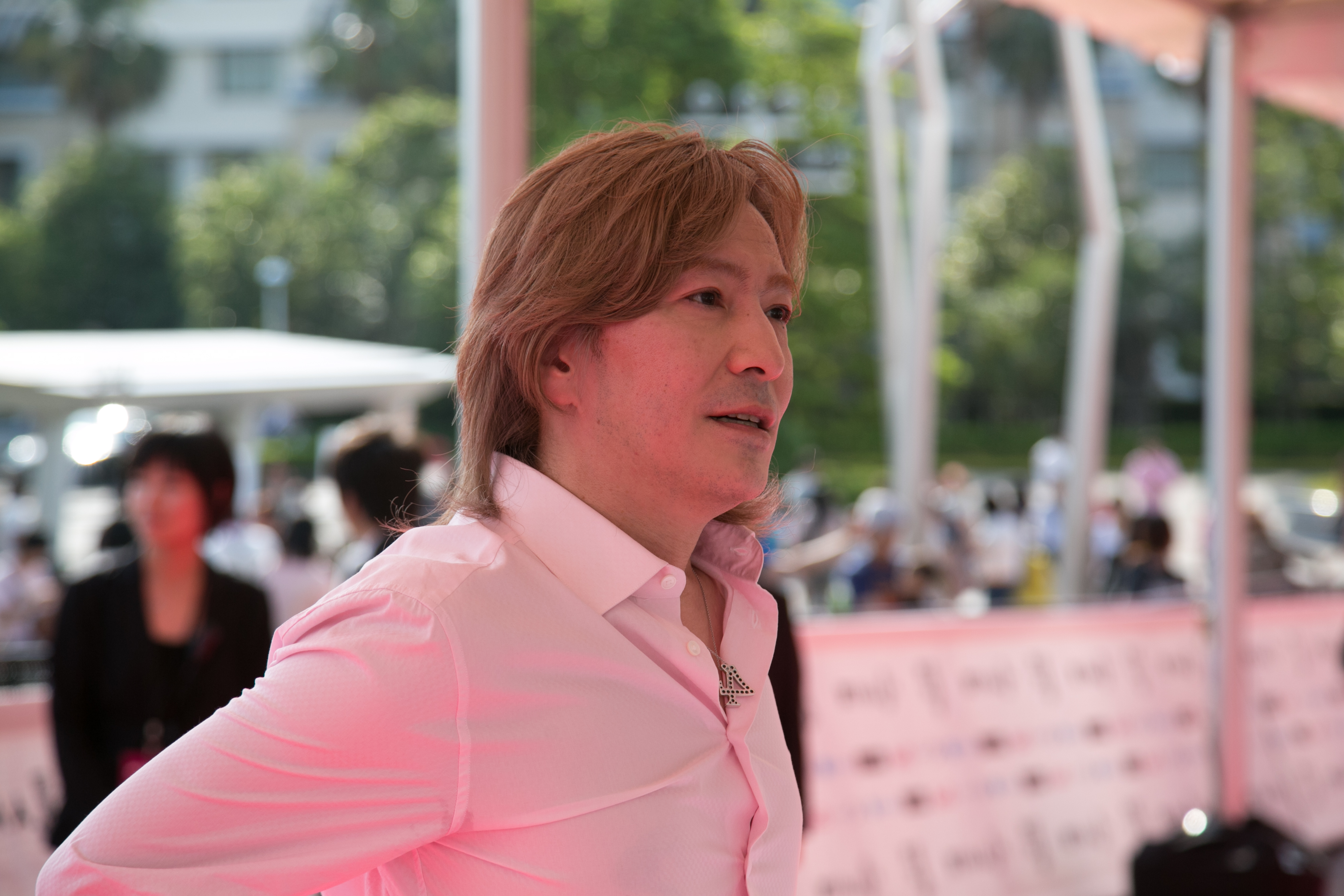
Tetsuya Komuro (pictured) co-wrote "Route 246" after his returning from retirement in 2018.

On July 16, 2021, Nogizaka46 announced the new single "Route 246" for release on July 24, to digital music and streaming platforms exclusively, two months after "Sekaijū no Rinjin yo", a charity single for tribute to hospital workers and people during the COVID-19 pandemic. The center position of the song is served by Asuka Saitō. The full song was aired for first time at the radio show Nogizaka46's All Night Nippon on July 22.

"Route 246" is the first song composed and arranged by Tetsuya Komuro since his retirement from the music industry in January 2018 with the last composed song "Kaze yo Fuke!" by Last Idol. It is also the first song that Yasushi Akimoto and Komuro worked together after about a decade.

== Composition ==
"Route 246" is described as an EDM song with the concept of "friendship", written by Yasushi Akimoto and composed by Tetsuya Komuro in the key of G minor, 125 beats per minute with a running time of 3 minutes and 52 seconds.

== Commercial performance ==
For the dated issue of August 3, 2020, "Route 246" entered Oricon Combined Singles Chart at number 13, and Digital Singles at number 4 with 33,391 downloads. The song debuted at number 10 on the Billboard Japan Hot 100 with 35,785 downloads (number 4 on the Download Songs), and 1,713,416 streams (number 43 on the Streaming Songs).

== Music video ==
The one-minute-and-thirteen-second music video teaser of "Route 246" was released on July 23, 2021, one day before the single release. The full music video was exclusively included on Nogizaka46's video album All MV Collection 2: Ano Toki no Kanojotachi, released on September 9. With the concept "current Tokyo", the music video was produced by Maxilla, a creative team who previously produced the group's music video "I See…", shot at Ōsanbashi Pier, Yokohama, and various places in Tokyo in early July. The music video was uploaded publicly via the group's official YouTube channel on May 11, 2023, as part of Saitō's graduation commemorative project.

== Live performance ==
Nogizaka46 performed "Route 246" for the first time at TV Asahi's Music Station 3.5 Hours SP on the release date, as well as TBS's CDTV Live! Live! on August 8, Nippon TV's Buzz Rhythm 02 on August 21, and Fuji TV's 2020 FNS Music Fes. Summer on August 26. At year-end music shows, they performed the song at Music Station Ultra Super Live 2020 on December 25, and 71st NHK Kōhaku Uta Gassen on December 31.

== Participating members ==
- First generation: Manatsu Akimoto, Erika Ikuta, Asuka Saitō (center), Kazumi Takayama, Minami Hoshino, Sayuri Matsumura
- Second generation: Hinako Kitano, Mai Shinuchi, Miona Hori
- Third generation: Reka Iwamoto, Minami Umezawa, Momoko Ōzono, Shiori Kubo, Mizuki Yamashita, Yūki Yoda
- Fourth generation: Sakura Endō, Haruka Kaki, Ayame Tsutsui

== Charts ==
=== Weekly charts ===
Weekly chart performances for "Route 246"
Chart (2020)	Peak position
Japan (Japan Hot 100)	10
Japan Combined Singles (Oricon)	13

=== Year-end charts ===
Year-end chart performance for "Route 246"
Chart (2020)	Position
Japan Download Songs (Billboard Japan)	47

== Certifications ==
Certifications for "Route 246"
Region	Certification	Certified units/sales
Japan (RIAJ)	Gold	100,000^{*}
Streaming
Japan (RIAJ)	Gold	50,000,000^{†}
^{*} Sales figures based on certification alone.^{†} Streaming-only figures based on certification alone.

== Release history ==
Release dates and formats for "Route 246"
Region	Date	Format	Label	Ref.
Japan	July 24, 2020	Digital download; streaming	Sony Music Japan	
Various	August 15, 2020	Digital download; streaming	Sony Music Japan	
Philippines	May 21, 2024	Digital download; streaming	Sony Music Philippines	
