= Sekaijū no Rinjin yo =

2020 song by Nogizaka46

Single by Nogizaka46

from the album Time Flies
- Released: 17 June 2020 (Japan); 24 June 2020 (Worldwide)
- Genre: J-pop
- Length: 6:11
- Label: N46Div.
- Producer: Yasushi Akimoto

Nogizaka46 singles chronology
"Shiawase no Hogoshoku" (2020)	"Sekaijū no Rinjin yo" (2020)	"Route 246" (2020)

Music video
- "Sekaijū no Rinjin yo" on YouTube

"Sekaijū no Rinjin yo" (Japanese: 世界中の隣人よ; lit. "to neighbors around the world") is a song released by Japanese idol group Nogizaka46. The song was written in response to the COVID-19 pandemic and was released digitally only as a charity single.

== Background and composition ==
"Sekaijū no Rinjin yo" was written as a tribute to the efforts of hospital workers during the pandemic as well as citizens practicing social distancing by staying at home. The lyrics call for unity in order to curb the spread of the virus.

The song's music video was revealed on 25 May 2020. In the video, footage of Nogizaka46's members singing at home was played on the jumbotron of an empty Meiji Jingu Stadium, a venue that Nogizaka46 has performed annually as part of the "Midsummer National Tour" from 2014 until 2019. Every member in the group participated in the song, including Mai Shiraishi, who intended on leaving the group after the release of "Shiawase no Hogoshoku" but delayed her departure due to the pandemic. Additionally, eleven former members also performed the song: Rina Ikoma, Rena Ichiki, Karin Itō, Misa Etō, Chiharu Saitō, Yūri Saitō, Iori Sagara, Reika Sakurai, Nishino Nanase, Ami Nōjō, and Yumi Wakatsuki.

== Reception ==
Initially, the song was not intended to be released commercially. However, immediately after the music video was posted on YouTube, the song went viral and reached a million views on YouTube within 20 hours. Therefore, Nogizaka46 decided to release the song as a digital download, where all proceeds would be donated to medical personnel combatting the virus. The song was released on 17 June within Japan and 24 June internationally. According to Billboard Japan, the song was the most downloaded song within the week of its release.

The song was one of nine recipients of the Excellent Work Award at the 62nd Japan Record Awards.

== Charts ==
Chart (2020)	Peak position
Japan Hot 100 (Billboard)	23

== See also ==
- Hanarete Ite mo
- Impact of the COVID-19 pandemic on the music industry
