= Time Flies (Nogizaka46 album) =

- Regular edition cover

Greatest hits album by Nogizaka46
- Released: December 15, 2021
- Genre: J-pop
- Length: 182:32
- Language: Japanese
- Labels: N46Div.; Sony Japan
- Producer: Yasushi Akimoto

Nogizaka46 chronology
Ima ga Omoide ni Naru made (2019)	Time Flies (2021)	My Respect (2026)

Alternative cover
- Sony Music Shop limited 10-anniversary member custom cover edition artwork (Erika Ikuta version for example)

Singles from Time Flies
- 1. "Sing Out!" Released: May 29, 2019; 2. "Yoake Made Tsuyogaranakutemoii" Released: September 4, 2019; 3. "Shiawase no Hogoshoku" Released: March 25, 2020; 4. "Sekaijū no Rinjin yo" Released: June 17, 2020; 5. "Route 246" Released: July 24, 2020; 6. "Boku wa Boku o Suki ni Naru" Released: January 27, 2021; 7. "Gomen ne Fingers Crossed" Released: June 9, 2021; 8. "Kimi ni Shikarareta" Released: September 22, 2021; 9. "Saigo no Tight Hug" Released: November 5, 2021

Time Flies (stylized in sentence case) is the first greatest hits and second overall compilation album by Japanese idol girl group Nogizaka46. It was released on December 15, 2021, through N46Div., and Sony Music Records, two years and nine months after its predecessor studio album, Ima ga Omoide ni Naru made (2019) for the tenth-anniversary celebration of the group.

The album featured all their previous-released singles from the debut "Guruguru Curtain" to the latest "Kimi ni Shikarareta", including "Sekaijū no Rinjin yo", "Route 246", "Yukkuri to Saku Hana", and the lead single "Saigo no Tight Hug". Erika Ikuta, Mai Shinuchi, and Minami Hoshino participated as their last record from the group. Commercially, Time Flies debuted atop both the Oricon Albums Chart and Billboard Japan Hot Albums and certified platinum for physical release by Recording Industry Association of Japan (RIAJ), selling over 250,000 copies

== Background ==
Nogizaka46, a Japanese idol girl group was formed on August 21, 2011, labelling as an "official rival of AKB48", and debuted on February 22, 2012, with the single "Guruguru Curtain". Until October 2021, they released four studio albums, one compilation album, and twenty eight singles, mostly peaked atop Japan Oricon Albums Chart and Singles Chart. The group marked their career success with concluding their summer national concert tour in 2017 at Tokyo Dome, participating NHK Kōhaku Uta Gassen for six consecutive years since 2015, and winning the grand prize from Japan Record Awards with their singles "Influencer" (2017) and "Synchronicity" (2018) for two consecutive years.

The album's title Time Flies means "time passes surprisingly quickly", which is a "perfect word" to describe 10-year period of the group. On October 26, Erika Ikuta, a first generation member announced to graduate from the group on December 31 on her official blog. She said the greatest hits album is her last record that will appear. Later, Ikuta serves as a center position of the lead single "Saigo no Tight Hug". On November 18, Mai Shinuchi, a second generation member, announced graduation from the group in late January 2022 on her radio show Nogizaka46's All Night Nippon. She revealed her graduation song, titled "Anata kara no Sotsugyō" for the first time on the radio show. The song will be included on Time Flies.

== Release and promotion ==
Time Flies was released on December 15, 2021, in four editions: complete limited, first press limited, regular, and Sony Music Shop limited 10-anniversary member custom cover edition on CD, and Blu-ray (only complete limited and first press limited). It compiled all Nogizaka46 singles from their first single "Guruguru Curtain" to the twenty-eighth single "Kimi ni Shikarareta". The previous-released charity single "Sekaijū no Rinjin yo", the digital single "Route 246", and the unreleased song sung by the second generation members "Yukkuri to Saku Hana" were also included. For digital music and streaming platform, Time Flies was released in 3 editions: complete, regular, and new song only.

The complete limited edition was additionally included the group's 150-minute-long documentary 10th Anniversary Documentary – 10nen no Ayumi, while the first press limited included was included the accompanying music videos for all new tracks, and Shika-chan & Mot-chan no Dōga, behind-the-scene footages shot by the members.

=== Marketing ===
A promotional poster of the greatest hits album, depicts girls who show only the lower body walking and running with different costumes.

On October 10, 2021, 3:00 PM JST, Nogizaka46's YouTube channel Nogizaka Streaming Now started live streaming of Nogizaka46 Minutes, appeared Nogizaka46 members Manatsu Akimoto, Hinako Kitano, Minami Umezawa, and Haruka Kaki at Nogizaka area, which is the origin of the group's name, going to Nogizaka Station. They put up a promotional poster on the station's billboard to announce their tenth-anniversary greatest hits album, scheduled for release on December 15. To promote the album, the members announced a campaign to put up posters on billboards in all 38 stations with the ending word "-zaka" (坂) in Japan. Later the title Time Flies was announced on October 23.

The album's promotional poster shows six girls who show only the lower body walking and running with different costumes: from left to right student uniform, the group's purple tracksuit, "Kimi no Na wa Kibō" navy school uniform, "Kizuitara Kataomoi" purple dress, "Sayonara no Imi" red dress from 67th NHK Kōhaku Uta Gassen, "Influencer" violet outfit from 59th Japan Record Awards, and the group's "Kimi ni Shikarareta" current uniform, subtitled with the text "乃木坂46 10th Anniversary BEST ALBUM 12.15 Wed on sale", that shows 10-year reminiscence of the group.

To commemorate the release of Time Flies, the members will be releasing the Nogizaka46 playlists, which were selected the group's song by each member and hashtagged #わたしの乃木坂ベスト (Watashi no Nogizaka Besuto, "My Nogizaka Best") from November 8 to December 14, the day before the release date. On December 10, the purple lights–Nogizaka46's official color–lit up on Tokyo Tower for commemoration the album. The southern deck of the tower also showed the letter "46ベスト" (46 Best).

=== Cover artwork ===
The Sony Music Shop limited 10-anniversary member custom cover edition cover artworks of Time Flies for 37 members were revealed from October 27 to 31, 2021. They depict a member wearing the group's performance costume chosen by herself, who stands between blurred other two costumes.

All cover artworks of Time Flies except the Sony Music Shop limited cover were unveiled on November 8, showing lots of mannequins that wear Nogizaka46's performance costume and uniform taken at Nogizaka Station in the nighttime with dim light, which was based from their debut studio album Tōmei na Iro. For the complete limited, and first press limited edition, the mannequins were arranged in a row at the station's platform, while in the regular edition, the mannequins were not arranged near the paid area. These artworks were shot around mid-October by Yoshiharu Ōta, and handle the production by Takumi Kawamoto, Wataru Yoshida, and Noboru Wada, who worked with the first studio album.

=== Singles and other songs ===
"Saigo no Tight Hug" serves as a lead single of Time Flies. It was released on November 5, 2021, to digital music and streaming platforms. The song was written by Yasushi Akimoto, and composed by Katsuhiko Sugiyama. Erika Ikuta, who will be graduating from the group on December 31, serves as a center position of the song. The accompanying music video, directed by Kazuma Ikeda, was released on November 16.

Mai Shinuchi's graduation song "Anata kara no Sotsugyō" was unveiled on November 18, after her graduation from the group announcement. Other tracks were announced on the same day, including Ikuta's graduation song "Toki no Wadachi", and under members' track "Hard to Say". All tracks' music videos were teased on December 9.

=== Live performance ===
Nogizaka46 performed "Saigo no Tight Hug" for the first time at YTV's Best Hits Kayosai on November 11, 2021, alongside "Gomen ne Fingers Crossed". They will perform "Saigo no Tight Hug" at TBS's CDTV Live! Live! on November 15, which film at Tokyo National Museum, where is currently holding the group's exhibition, titled Shunkashūtō / Four Season Nogizaka46, alongside the special medley, titled Shunkashūtō Medley, consisting of "Harujion ga Sakukoro", "Jikochū de Ikō!", "Ima, Hanashitai Dareka ga Iru", and "Kaerimichi wa Tōmawari Shitaku Naru". The group performed the special medley, consisting of the songs released in 10 years: "Guruguru Curtain", "Girls' Rule", "Synchronicity", "Hadashi de Summer", and "Saigo no Tight Hug" on Nippon TV's Best Artist 2021 on November 17, as well as Shibuya Note on November 27. The group performed "Saigo no Tight Hug" at Fuji TV's FNS Music Festival on December 8, alongside Ikuta and Yuki Saito's collaboration "Sotsugyō".

Nogizaka46 members Erika Ikuta, Hina Higuchi, Shiori Kubo, Sakura Endō, and Haruka Kaki appeared on MTV's MTV Unplugged on December 11. The setlist was composed by Ikuta herself in an acoustic version, including "Hashire! Bicycle", "Gomen ne Fingers Crossed", and "Saigo no Tight Hug". The group performed "Influencer", "Synchronicity", and "Saigo no Tight Hug" at MTV Video Music Awards Japan 2021: The Live on December 18, which received MTV Pop the World Award. On December 24, the group performed the song at the 6-hour special edition of TV Asahi's Music Station, titled Music Station Ultra Super Live 2021, as well as Buzz Rhythm 02 along with "Sing Out!".

== Accolades ==
Awards and nominations for Time Flies
Ceremony	Year	Award	Result	Ref.
Japan Gold Disc Award	2022	Best 5 Albums	Won	

== Commercial performance ==
Time Flies debuted at number one on the Oricon Albums Chart, selling 282,222 copies in its first week, making it the group's sixth consecutive number-one album since their debut studio album Tōmei na Iro and the most consecutive number-one albums since a debut album in female group history. The album also entered Billboard Japan Hot Albums at number one, selling 281,946 copies (number one on the Top Albums Sales), and 2,179 download units (number two on the Download Albums). Time Flies certified platinum for physical release by RIAJ, surpassing 250,000 copies.

== Track listing ==
All lyrics are written by Yasushi Akimoto, except "Overture", which is instrumental.

Disc 1 – CD, digital download, streaming
No.	Title	Music	Arrangement	Length
1.	"Overture"	Seiichi Kyōda	Kyōda	1:18
2.	"Guruguru Curtain" (ぐるぐるカーテン)	Katsuhiko Kurosu	Atsushi Yuasa	4:06
3.	"Oide Shampoo" (おいでシャンプー)	Dai Odagiri	Tatoo	4:10
4.	"Hashire! Bicycle" (走れ!Bicycle)	Shusui; Ryō Itō; Atsushi Kimura; Her0ism	Yuasa	3:42
5.	"Seifuku no Mannequin" (制服のマネキン)	Katsuhiko Sugiyama	Hajime Hyakkoku	4:23
6.	"Kimi no Na wa Kibō" (君の名は希望)	Sugiyama	Sugiyama; Tatsurō Ariki	5:25
7.	"Girls' Rule" (ガールズルール)	Kōji Gotō	Gotō	4:49
8.	"Barrette (song)" (バレッタ)	Yoshihiro Saito	Makoto Wakatabe	4:19
9.	"Kizuitara Kataomoi" (気づいたら片想い)	Akira Sunset	Yuasa	4:14
10.	"Natsu no Free & Easy" (夏のFree＆Easy)	Tomonori Inoue	Kōta Hashimoto	5:02
11.	"Nandome no Aozora ka?" (何度目の青空か?)	Masahiro Kawaura	Hyakkoku	4:49
12.	"Inochi wa Utsukushii" (命は美しい)	Hiroki Sagawa	Sagawa	5:15
13.	"Taiyō Knock" (太陽ノック)	Kurosu	Naoyuki Osada	4:03
14.	"Ima, Hanashitai Dareka ga Iru" (今、話したい誰かがいる)	Akira Sunset; Apazzi	Akira Sunset; Apazzi	4:24
15.	"Harujion ga Sakukoro" (ハルジオンが咲く頃)	Akira Sunset; Apazzi	Akira Sunset; Apazzi	5:28

Disc 2 – CD, digital download, streaming
No.	Title	Music	Arrangement	Length
1.	"Hadashi de Summer" (裸足でSummer)	Hidetoshi Fukumori	Apazzi	4:37
2.	"Sayonara no Imi" (サヨナラの意味)	Sugiyama	Wakatabe	4:59
3.	"Influencer" (インフルエンサー)	Shinya Sumida	Apazzi	4:30
4.	"Nigemizu" (逃げ水)	Yōhei Tanimura	Tanimura	5:08
5.	"Itsuka Dekiru kara Kyō Dekiru" (いつかできるから今日できる)	Akira Sunset; Kyōda	Kyōda; Akira Sunset	4:39
6.	"Synchronicity" (シンクロニシティ)	Satori Shiraishi	Shiraishi	4:14
7.	"Jikochū de Ikō!" (ジコチューで行こう!)	Nazca	Yūichi "Masa" Nonaka	4:09
8.	"Kaerimichi wa Tōmawari Shitaku Naru" (帰り道は遠回りしたくなる)	Toshihiko Watanabe	Watanabe; Hirotaka Hayakawa	4:29
9.	"Sing Out!"	Ryota Saito; Tetta	Nonaka	5:25
10.	"Yoake Made Tsuyogaranakutemoii" (夜明けまで強がらなくてもいい)	Yūsuke Yamada	Apazzi	4:20
11.	"Shiawase no Hogoshoku" (しあわせの保護色)	Masanori Ura	Seiji Mutō	5:05
12.	"Boku wa Boku o Suki ni Naru" (僕は僕を好きになる)	Sugiyama	Sugiyama; Tsuyoshi Ishihara	4:51
13.	"Gomen ne Fingers Crossed" (ごめんねFingers crossed)	Sugiyama; Apazzi	Apazzi	4:17
14.	"Kimi ni Shikarareta" (君に叱られた)	Youth Case	Tomoki Ishizuka	4:24
15.	"Saigo no Tight Hug" (最後のTight Hug)	Sugiyama	Sugiyama; Manabu Yachi	4:55
Total length:				135:29

Disc 3 – CD (complete limited and first press limited bonus tracks), digital download, streaming (complete edition)
No.	Title	Music	Arrangement	Length
1.	"Boku ga Iru Basho" (僕がいる場所)	Sugiyama	Sugiyama; Ariki	5:04
2.	"Kikkake" (きっかけ)	Sugiyama	Sugiyama; Ariki	5:20
3.	"Skydiving" (スカイダイビング)	Tatsuji Sugai	Sugai	4:08
4.	"Arigachi na Ren'ai" (ありがちな恋愛)	Sugiyama	Nonaka	3:57
5.	"Sekaijū no Rinjin yo" (世界中の隣人よ)	Taka	Taka	6:12
6.	"Route 246"	Tetsuya Komuro	Komuro; Music Design	3:53
7.	"Yukkuri to Saku Hana" (ゆっくりと咲く花)	Yōsen Ishikawa	Nonaka	4:38
8.	"Toki no Wadachi" (歳月の轍)	Akira Sunset; Apazzi	Apazzi; Akira Sunset	5:49
9.	"Anata kara no Sotsugyō" (あなたからの卒業)	Tony23	Nonaka	3:55
10.	"Hard to Say"	Tee Tea	Shinta	4:07
Total length:				182:32

Complete limited edition bonus tracks – Blu-ray
No.	Title	Length
1.	"10th Anniversary Documentary Movie – 10nen no Ayumi" (10年の歩み)

First press limited edition bonus tracks – Blu-ray
No.	Title	Director(s)	Length
1.	"Saigo no Tight Hug" (music video)	Kazuma Ikeda	4:52
2.	"Toki no Wadachi" (music video)	Atsunori Tōshi	5:46
3.	"Anata kara no Sotsugyō" (music video)	Shūto Itō	3:52
4.	"Hard to Say" (music video)	Tarō Okagawa	4:04
5.	"Shika-chan & Mot-chan's Movie" (しかちゃん・もっちゃんの動画)

New song edition – digital download, streaming
No.	Title	Music	Arrangement	Length
1.	"Sekaijū no Rinjin yo" (世界中の隣人よ)	Taka	Taka	6:12
2.	"Route 246"	Komuro	Komuro; Music Design	3:53
3.	"Yukkuri to Saku Hana" (ゆっくりと咲く花)	Ishikawa	Nonaka	4:38
4.	"Saigo no Tight Hug" (最後のTight Hug)	Sugiyama	Sugiyama; Yachi	4:55
5.	"Toki no Wadachi" (歳月の轍)	Akira Sunset; Apazzi	Apazzi; Akira Sunset	5:49
6.	"Anata kara no Sotsugyō" (あなたからの卒業)	Tony23	Nonaka	3:55
7.	"Hard to Say"	Tee Tea	Shinta	4:07
Total length:				33:29

Notes

- "Overture" is stylized in all caps.
- "Hard to Say" is stylized in sentence case.

== Charts ==
=== Weekly charts ===
Weekly chart performance for Time Flies
Chart (2021)	Peak position
Japanese Albums (Oricon)	1
Japanese Combined Albums (Oricon)	1
Japanese Hot Albums (Billboard Japan)	1

=== Monthly charts ===
Monthly chart performance for Time Flies
Chart (2021)	Position
Japanese Albums (Oricon)	1

=== Year-end charts ===
Year-end chart performance for Time Flies
Chart (2022)	Position
Japanese Albums (Oricon)	9
Japanese Hot Albums (Billboard Japan)	12

== Certifications and sales ==
Sales certifications and figures for Time Flies
Region	Certification	Certified units/sales
Japan (RIAJ) Physical	Platinum	352,697
Japan Digital	—	3,642 (Note: Combined regular and New Song edition.)

== Release history ==
Release dates and formats for Time Flies
Region	Date	Format	Version	Label	Ref.
Various	December 15, 2021	Digital download; streaming	Complete	N46Div.; Sony Japan	
Various	December 15, 2021	Digital download; streaming	Regular	N46Div.; Sony Japan	
Various	December 15, 2021	Digital download; streaming	New song	N46Div.; Sony Japan	
Japan	December 15, 2021	CD+Blu-ray	Complete limited	N46Div.; Sony Japan	
Japan	December 15, 2021	CD+Blu-ray	First press limited	N46Div.; Sony Japan	
Japan	December 15, 2021	CD	Regular	N46Div.; Sony Japan	
Japan	December 15, 2021	CD	Member custom cover	N46Div.; Sony Japan	

== See also ==
- List of Oricon number-one albums of 2021
- List of Billboard Japan Hot Albums number ones of 2021
