= List of Billboard Japan Hot Albums number ones of 2021 =

The following is a list of weekly number-one albums on the Billboard Japan Hot Albums chart in 2021.

== Chart history ==
Issue date	Song	Artist(s)	Ref.
January 4	O Album	KinKi Kids	
January 11	This Is Arashi (This Is 嵐)	Arashi	
January 18	1ST	SixTones	
January 25	Straight Outta Rhyme Anima	Hypnosis Mic: Division Rap Battle	
February 1	Still Dreaming	Tomorrow X Together	
February 8	Aster (アスター, Asutā)	Colon	
February 15	Live Loud	The Yellow Monkey	
February 22	Sekai no Owari 2010-2019	Sekai no Owari	
March 1	Loveholic	NCT 127	
March 8	Dotsuitare Hompo vs Buster Bros!!! (どついたれ本舗 vs Buster Bros!!!)	Hypnosis Mic: Division Rap Battle	
March 15	SZ10th	Sexy Zone	
March 22	One Last Kiss	Hikaru Utada	
March 29	rainboW	Johnny's West	
April 5	ヒプノシスマイク -Division Rap Battle- 2nd Division Rap Battle	Fling Posse vs. Mad Trigger Crew	
April 12	The First Step: Treasure Effect	Treasure	
April 19	超特急 ≠ME行き	≠Me	
April 26	Walpurgis	Aimer	
May 3	Be	BTS	
May 10	Border: Carnival	Enhypen	
May 17	Flavors of Love	Monsta X	
May 24	Zenbu, Naisho." (全部、内緒。)	=Love	
May 31	Ladybug	LiSA	
June 7	Demon Slayer: Kimetsu no Yaiba – Tanjiro Kamado Risshi-hen Original Soundtrack	Various artists	
June 14	Playful	Koichi Domoto	
June 21	The Chaos Chapter: Freeze	Tomorrow X Together	
June 28	BTS, the Best	BTS	
July 5	BTS, the Best	BTS	
July 12	BTS, the Best	BTS	
July 19	L∞ve	Urashimasakatasen	
July 26	Butter	BTS	
August 2	Re:Sense	King & Prince	
August 9	Perfect World	Twice	
August 16	Going to Destruction	Bish	
August 23	Best of Kis-My-Ft2	Kis-My-Ft2	
August 30	Editorial	Official Hige Dandism	
September 6	Go to Funk	Endrecheri	
September 13	Step	V6	
September 20	Hypnosis Mic: Division Rap Battle – 2nd D.R.B: Buster Bros!!! VS Matenro VS Fling Posse	Hypnosis Mic: Division Rap Battle	
September 27	Gohan Misoshiru Nori Otsukemono Tamagoyaki feat. Umeboshi	Keisuke Kuwata	
October 4	Gohan Misoshiru Nori Otsukemono Tamagoyaki feat. Umeboshi	Keisuke Kuwata	
October 11	Snow Mania S1	Snow Man	
October 18	Snow Mania S1	Snow Man	
October 25	Dimension: Dilemma	Enhypen	
November 1	Attacca	Seventeen	
November 8	Very6 Best	V6	
November 15	Attacca	Seventeen	
November 22	Chaotic Wonderland	Tomorrow X Together	
November 29	8beat	Kanjani Eight	
December 6	U	NiziU	
December 13	The Book 2	Yoasobi	
December 20	Friends III	B'z	
December 27	Time Flies	Nogizaka46	

== See also ==
- List of Hot 100 number-one singles of 2021
