= Gomen ne Fingers Crossed =

2021 single by Nogizaka46

- Regular edition cover

Single by Nogizaka46

from the album Time Flies
- B-side: "Zenbu Yume no Mama"; "Otonatachi ni wa Shiji Sarenai" (Type-A); "Zabun Zazabun" (Type-B); "Sa~ Yu~ Ready?" (Type-C); "Sabita Compass" (Type-D); "Nekojita Camomile Tea" (Regular)
- Released: June 9, 2021
- Genre: J-pop
- Length: 4:17
- Label: N46Div.; Sony Music Japan
- Composers: Katsuhiko Sugiyama; Apazzi
- Lyricist: Yasushi Akimoto
- Producer: Yasushi Akimoto (exec.)

Nogizaka46 singles chronology
"Boku wa Boku o Suki ni Naru" (2021)	"Gomen ne Fingers Crossed" (2021)	"Kimi ni Shikarareta" (2021)

Music video
- "Gomen ne Fingers Crossed" on YouTube

"Gomen ne Fingers Crossed" (ごめんねFingers crossed; lit. "I'm Sorry, Fingers Crossed") is a song recorded by Japanese idol group Nogizaka46. It was released on June 9, 2021, as the group's 27th single, through N46Div. The song was written by Yasushi Akimoto and composed by Katsuhiko Sugiyama and Apazzi. Sakura Endō served as the center position, and Sayuri Matsumura, Junna Itō, Miria Watanabe, and Momoko Ōzono participated as their last single from the group. The song charted atop the Oricon Singles Chart and Billboard Japan Hot 100.

== Background and release ==
Nogizaka46 announced their 27th single on April 11, 2021, and the participating members (senbatsu) on April 18 in the group's television show Nogizaka Under Construction. The title "Gomen ne Fingers Crossed" was announced on May 3. The full song was unveiled on May 6 on Tokyo FM's radio show School of Lock! in the part of Nogizaka Lock!, in which the member Haruka Kaki is a regular cast. The song was performed for the first time on June 4 at the television show Buzz Rhythm 02.

The physical-format single set to be released on June 9, in 4 limited editions: Type-A, Type-B, Type-C, and Type-D, and regular edition. The limited editions also included all 43-members' individual PVs. The cover artworks of all physical releases were unveiled on May 10, taken by Kenta Karima in early April. They show the members freely enjoy themselves with oversized soap bubbles, confetti, feather, a lot of balloons and large-size colorful cellophanes. The special edition was released to digital music and streaming platform on June 2, 2021.

=== B-sides ===
The B-sides "Nekojita Camomile Tea" (猫舌カモミールティー; "Cat Tongue Camomile Tea") sung by fourth generation members and "Otonatachi ni wa Shiji Sarenai" (大人たちには指示されない; "Adults Can't Order Me Around") sung by third generation members was announced and performed for the first time on the encore part of their concert 9th Year Birthday Live on May 8 and 9, respectively. The under members (members who do not participate in the main song) song of the single was announced on May 10, titled "Sabita Compass" (錆びたコンパス; "Rusted Compass") on the radio show Yamazaki Rena no Dareka ni Hanashitakatta Koto.

The other three tracks were unveiled on May 15: collaboration song with rhythm game Nogizaka Rhythm Festival, "Zenbu Yume no Mama" (全部 夢のまま; "It's All Just a Dream"), Yūki Yoda and Ayame Tsutsui's unit song, "Zabun Zazabun" (ざぶんざざぶん; "Splash"), and Sayuri Matsumura solo song for graduation (leaving) from the group, "Sa~ Yu~ Ready?" (さ~ゆ~Ready?). "Zenbu Yume no Mama" was unveiled and performed on May 21 in the live video of the game. The full song of "Zabun Zazabin" was aired in Nogizaka46 no "No" on May 23.

== Lyrics and composition ==
"Gomen ne Fingers Crossed" was written lyrics by Yasushi Akimoto, and composed by Katsuhiko Sugiyama and Apazzi in the key of D major, 130 beats per minute with a running time of 4 minutes and 17 seconds. The song is about sadness when thinking about another person. Sakura Endō, who served as a center position of the song said "Gomen ne Fingers Crossed" is a good tempo and the overall mature tone is impressive. "Fingers crossed" means "good luck", so she thinks it's a sad but positive farewell song.

== Commercial performance ==
On the Oricon charts, "Gomen ne Fingers Crossed" debuted at number 19 on the Oricon Digital Singles Chart for the chart issue date of June 14, 2021, with 5,046 download units. The special edition of the single debuted at number 1 on the Oricon Digital Albums Chart with 4,003 download units. The single debuted at number one on the Oricon Singles Chart for the chart issue date of June 21, 2021, selling 589,751 copies, recorded as the 26th single in a row since the group's 2nd single, "Oide Shampoo", and the female artist's best-selling single in 2021.

The song entered number 44 on the Billboard Japan Hot 100 for the chart issue date of June 9, 2021. In its second week dated June 16, the song jumped to number 1 due to physical release. The single debuted atop the Top Singles Sales, selling 704,346 copies.

On July 9, 2021, "Gomen ne Fingers Crossed" received a triple platinum certification from the Recording Industry Association of Japan (RIAJ), denoting shipments of 750,000 copies.

== Music video ==
On May 11, 2021, the special website for the 27th single was launched. It was revealed the details about a story, characters, and relation diagram in the music video. The full music video was premiered due to the launch of the group's new YouTube channel Nogizaka Streaming Now and uploaded to the group's official YouTube channel on May 13.

The music video "Gomen ne Fingers Crossed" was directed by Atsunori Tōshi, who also was directed the group's song "Wilderness World", and shot at the big steel factory in Ibaraki Prefecture in mid-April. The music video uses an "auto racing" theme with a "3 to 3" match between team Lost and Found (Yūki Yoda, Sakura Endō, and Haruka Kaki) and team Rain Bringer (Erika Ikuta, Asuka Saitō, and Mizuki Yamashita), with the six powerful and fast racing cars. The background shows a diner secretly operating at a beach, where racers competing for speed gathered from all over Japan. Director said the music video was inspired by the movie Fast & Furious. The music video also shows a dance scene shot in the rain.

=== B-sides ===
The b-side music videos "Zabun Zazabun" from Type-B and "Sabita Compass" from Type-D were released simultaneously on May 25, 2021. The music video "Zabun Zazabun" was directed by Kazuki Takahashi, shot mainly at Yokosuka, Kanagawa Prefecture in mid-April. The story shows Yūki Yoda invites Ayame Tsutsui to go out with her to encourage Tsutsui, who is depressed because of her unrequited love. The music video also shows a dance scene at the beach, which was choreographed in the image of a wave, and a rowing boat scene in the sea to go offshore in the last scene. The music video "Sabita Compass" was directed by Takurō Ōkubo, shot in a road movie style for two days in mid-April at Izu, Shizuoka Prefecture. The story shows the members who go on a trip to keep a fun memory and visit various places in the city. Many of the photos were taken by members themselves, make a handmade feeling.

The music video "Zenbu Yume no Mama" was released on May 28. It was directed by Yuki Kamiya, shot at the hotel in Chiba Prefecture in early April. It is a story-style music video about Yūki Yoda, who got lost in a luxurious and classical Western mansion, explored with a guide while being tossed by the residents.

The music video "Sa~ Yu~ Ready?", Sayuri Matsumura's graduation song from Type-C was released on June 1. It was directed in mid to late April by 3 directors, Kentarō Hagiwara in the first part, Shigeru Tsukita in the second part, and Shūto Itō in the third part. The first part shows Matsumura practicing finger dance. The second part shows her cooking a karaage. The images and motifs from the interlude to the last reflected the intention and all the songs of herself.

== Track listing ==
Credits adapted from the official website, Tower Records Japan and Tidal. All lyrics are written by Yasushi Akimoto, expect off vocal (instrumental) version tracks.

=== Limited edition ===
Type-A – CD
No.	Title	Music	Arrangement	Length
1.	"Gomen ne Fingers Crossed" (ごめんねFingers crossed)	Katsuhiko Sugiyama; Apazzi	Apazzi	4:17
2.	"Zenbu Yume no Mama" (全部 夢のまま)	You-me	Hiroshi Sasaki	4:44
3.	"Otonatachi ni wa Shiji Sarenai" (大人たちには指示されない)	Basemint	Basemint	4:12
4.	"Gomen ne Fingers Crossed" (off vocal version)	Sugiyama; Apazzi	Apazzi	4:17
5.	"Zenbu Yume no Mama" (off vocal version)	You-me	Sasaki	4:44
6.	"Otonatachi ni wa Shiji Sarenai" (off vocal version)	Basemint	Basemint	4:11
Total length:				26:25

Type-A – Blu-ray
No.	Title	Director(s)	Length
1.	"Gomen ne Fingers Crossed" (music video)	Atsunori Tōshi	4:35
2.	"Zenbu Yume no Mama" (music video)	Yuki Kamiya	5:07
3.	"Riria Itō: Warp!!!" (伊藤理々杏 : ワープ!!!)	Mana Inoue
4.	"Minami Umezawa : Baiiro" (梅澤美波 : 梅色)	Katsu'aki Ishii
5.	"Sakura Endō: Ienai" (遠藤さくら : 言えない。)	Nana Suzuki; Yoshimitsu Sawamoto (creative)
6.	"Momoko Ōzono: Momoko to Mame Zō to" (大園桃子 : ももことまめぞうと)	Hiroshi Takano
7.	"Ayame Tsutsui: Elite Sha'in Tsutsui Ayame" (筒井あやめ : エリート社員 筒井あやめ)	Hikawa Hikaru
8.	"Reno Nakamura: Ani, Fuzai" (中村麗乃 : 兄、不在。)	Naoki Kaneko
9.	"Runa Hayashi: ABC Yosō Kaisetsu Shite Mita" (林瑠奈 : ABC予想解説してみた)	Takumi Yobinori
10.	"Minami Hoshino: Hoshino Minami no Tonikaku Kawaii Karuta" (星野みなみ : 星野みなみのとにかくかわいいかるた)	Yukiko Matsuo
11.	"Ayano Christie Yoshida: Watashi o Sagashite" (吉田綾乃クリスティー : わたしをさがして)	Shin'ichirō Ōta
12.	"Maaya Wada: Ketsuekigata" (和田まあや : 血液型)	Yūya Kimura

Type-B – CD
No.	Title	Music	Arrangement	Length
1.	"Gomen ne Fingers Crossed"	Sugiyama; Apazzi	Apazzi	4:17
2.	"Zenbu Yume no Mama"	You-me	Sasaki	4:44
3.	"Zabun Zazabun" (ざぶんざざぶん)	Novechika; Tetta	Yūichi "Masa" Nonaka	3:48
4.	"Gomen ne Fingers Crossed" (off vocal version)	Sugiyama; Apazzi	Apazzi	4:17
5.	"Zenbu Yume no Mama" (off vocal version)	You-me	Sasaki	4:44
6.	"Zabun Zazabun" (off vocal version)	Novechika; Tetta	Masa	3:46
Total length:				25:36

Type-B – Blu-ray
No.	Title	Director(s)	Length
1.	"Gomen ne Fingers Crossed" (music video)	Tōshi	4:35
2.	"Zabun Zazabun" (music video)	Kazuki Takahashi	4:08
3.	"Erika Ikuta: Jingi Naki Iku-chan (Oshioki no Maki)" (生田絵梨花 : 仁義なきいくちゃん~おしおきの巻~)	Miki Sakurai
4.	"Kaeda Satō: Kaede ga Oni" (佐藤楓 : 楓が鬼)	Sōtarō Ogi
5.	"Rika Satō: Rika no Hōsoku" (佐藤璃果 : リカの法則)	Akari Okada
6.	"Shibata Yuna: Shibata-san Machigattemasu yo" (柴田柚菜 : 柴田さん間違ってますよ。)	Hiroshi Ōhara
7.	"Kazumi Takayama: Chanto Shita Asa Gohan" (高山一実 : ちゃんとした朝ごはん)	Hikaru Miyata
8.	"Mayu Tamura: Record of the Dead" (田村真佑 : Record of the Dead)	Keita Yamamoto
9.	"Hina Higuchi: #ChimaDate" (樋口日奈 : #ちまデート)	Shiyuka Takashima
10.	"Rena Yamazaki: Yamazaki Reina no Healthy Challenge" (山崎怜奈 : 山崎怜奈のヘルシーチャレンジ)	Jon
11.	"Nao Yumiki: Anger Management" (弓木奈於 : アンガーマネジメント)	Taisuke Fukuda
12.	"Yūki Yoda: Yodayuki" (与田祐希 : ヨダユキ)	Nozomu Hayashi
13.	"Miria Watanabe: Spring Train" (渡辺みり愛 : Spring Train)	Momoko Ishida

Type-C – CD
No.	Title	Music	Arrangement	Length
1.	"Gomen ne Fingers Crossed"	Sugiyama; Apazzi	Apazzi	4:17
2.	"Zenbu Yume no Mama"	You-me	Sasaki	4:44
3.	"Sa~ Yu~ Ready?" (さ~ゆ~Ready?)	Masayoshi Kawabata	Kawabata	5:32
4.	"Gomen ne Fingers Crossed" (off vocal version)	Sugiyama; Apazzi	Apazzi	4:17
5.	"Zenbu Yume no Mama" (off vocal version)	You-me	Sasaki	4:44
6.	"Sa~ Yu~ Ready?" (off vocal version)	Kawabata	Kawabata	5:31
Total length:				29:05

Type-C – Blu-ray
No.	Title	Director(s)	Length
1.	"Gomen ne Fingers Crossed" (music video)	Tōshi	4:35
2.	"Sa~ Yu~ Ready?" (music video)	Kentarō Hagiwara; Shigeru Tsukita; Shūto Itō	6:06
3.	"Haruka Kaki: BGMR" (賀喜遥香 : BGMR)	Nozomi Ueda
4.	"Sayaka Kakehashi: Machiawase" (掛橋沙耶香 : マチアワセ)	Mei Kouda
5.	"Yuri Kitagawa: Soratobu Shōjo" (北川悠理 : 空飛ぶ少女)	Yasuki Satō
6.	"Hinako Kitano: Watashi ga Idol de Irareru Jikan" (北野日奈子 : ワタシがアイドルでいられる時間)	Daisaku Fujino
7.	"Asuka Saitō: Love Story wa Totsuden ni" (齋藤飛鳥 : ラブ・ストーリーは凸電に)	Yūsuke Koroyasu
8.	"Mai Shinuchi: Take a Taxi" (新内眞衣 : テイク・ア・タクシー)	Masaya Suzuki
9.	"Ayane Suzuki: Chiisana Koto o Hitotsu" (鈴木絢音 : ちいさなことをひとつ)	Kaori Imaizumi
10.	"Rei Seimiya: Watashi no Rakugaki Oji-san" (清宮レイ : わたしのラクガキおじさん)	Ryō Miyamoto
11.	"Sayuri Matsumura: Kono Timing de Hissatsu-waza Sayuringo Punch o Kansei Sasetai Nen" (松村沙友理 : このタイミングで必殺技さゆりんごパンチを完成させたいねん)	Shūji Hirooka
12.	"Hazuki Mukai: Baba Bella Beginner" (向井葉月 : ババベラビギナー)	Chika Naitō
13.	"Mio Yakubo: Nen'iri" (矢久保美緒 : 念入り)	Minori Hamada

Type-D – CD
No.	Title	Music	Arrangement	Length
1.	"Gomen ne Fingers Crossed"	Sugiyama; Apazzi	Apazzi	4:17
2.	"Zenbu Yume no Mama"	You-me	Sasaki	4:44
3.	"Sabita Compass" (錆びたコンパス)	Daisuke Nakamura	Nakamura	4:16
4.	"Gomen ne Fingers Crossed" (off vocal version)	Sugiyama; Apazzi	Apazzi	4:17
5.	"Zenbu Yume no Mama" (off vocal version)	You-me	Sasaki	4:44
6.	"Sabita Compass" (off vocal version)	Nakamura	Nakamura	4:15
Total length:				26:33

Type-D – Blu-ray
No.	Title	Director(s)	Length
1.	"Gomen ne Fingers Crossed" (music video)	Tōshi	4:35
2.	"Sabita Compass" (music video)	Takurō Ōkubo	5:21
3.	"Manatsu Akimoto: A Day in the Life of Manatsu" (秋元真夏 : A DAY IN THE LIFE OF MANATSU)	Tetsurō Furui
4.	"Junna Itō: Tōkyō no Onna no Ko" (伊藤純奈 : 東京の女の子。)	Kiyotsugu Kikuchi
5.	"Renka Iwamoto: Rentan Kin'gyo" (岩本蓮加 : れんたん金魚)	Keita Nakae
6.	"Saya Kanagawa: Runner's High" (金川紗耶 : ランナーズ ハイ)	Keitarō Kobayashi
7.	"Shiori Kubo: Haru, Futari" (久保史緒里 : 春、ふたり)	Saki Michimoto
8.	"Haruka Kuromi: Nōnai Kaigi" (黒見明香 : 脳内会議)	Sōta Takamiya
9.	"Tamami Sakaguchi: Skater's Waltz" (阪口珠美 : SKATER'S WALTZ)	Ken Katsuno
10.	"Ranze Terada: Saigo no Bansan" (寺田蘭世 : さいごの晩餐)	Yū Kotaki
11.	"Seira Hayakawa Daisuki Sugite, Seira-chan ni Natchatta!" (早川聖来 : 大好きすぎて、聖来ちゃんになっちゃった!)	Bebi
12.	"Miyu Matsuo: Tsuki ga Kirei desu ne" (松尾美佑 : 月が綺麗ですね)	Hiroho Mieno
13.	"Mizuki Yamashita: Wagamama" (山下美月 : わがまま)	Rikiya Imaizumi

=== Regular edition ===
Regular edition – CD
No.	Title	Music	Arrangement	Length
1.	"Gomen ne Fingers Crossed"	Sugiyama; Apazzi	Apazzi	4:17
2.	"Zenbu Yume no Mama"	You-me	Sasaki	4:44
3.	"Nekojita Camomile Tea" (猫舌カモミールティー)	Shinobu Suzuki	Suzuki	4:03
4.	"Gomen ne Fingers Crossed" (off vocal version)	Sugiyama; Apazzi	Apazzi	4:17
5.	"Zenbu Yume no Mama" (off vocal version)	You-me	Sasaki	4:44
6.	"Nekojita Camomile Tea" (off vocal version)	Suzuki	Suzuki	4:02
Total length:				26:07

=== Special edition ===
Special edition – digital download, streaming
No.	Title	Music	Arrangement	Length
1.	"Gomen ne Fingers Crossed"	Sugiyama; Apazzi	Apazzi	4:17
2.	"Zenbu Yume no Mama"	You-me	Sasaki	4:44
3.	"Otonatachi ni wa Shiji Sarenai"	Basemint	Basemint	4:12
4.	"Zabun Zazabun"	Novechika; Tetta	Masa	3:48
5.	"Sa~ Yu~ Ready?"	Kawabata	Kawabata	5:32
6.	"Sabita Compass"	Nakamura	Nakamura	4:16
7.	"Nekojita Camomile Tea"	Suzuki	Suzuki	4:03
Total length:				30:52

== Participating members ==
The 20 members were selected to be participating (senbatsu) members for "Gomen ne Fingers Crossed", and 12 members for fukujin (first and second-row members). Sakura Endō was selected as the center position for the second time since "Yoake Made Tsuyogaranakutemoii". Seira Hayakawa was selected to participate for the first time. Sayuri Matsumura, and Momoko Ōzono participate as their last single from the group.

- Third row: Higuchi Hina, Hayakawa Seira, Ayame Tsutsui, Momoko Ōzono, Renka Iwamoto, Rei Seimiya, Mayu Tamura, Mai Shinuchi
- Second row: Manatsu Akimoto, Minami Umezawa, Minami Hoshino, Sayuri Matsumura, Erika Ikuta, Shiori Kubo, Kazumi Takayama
- First row: Yūki Yoda, Asuka Saitō, Sakura Endō (center), Mizuki Yamashita, Haruka Kaki

=== B-sides ===
"Zenbu Yume no Mama"

All participating members of "Boku wa Boku o Suki ni Naru", except graduated member Miona Hori, participate in the song. Yūki Yoda served as the center position.

"Otonatachi ni wa Shiji Sarenai"

All 12 members from third generation members participate in the song. Renka Iwamoto served as the center position.

- Riria Itō
- Renka Iwamoto (center)
- Minami Umezawa
- Momoko Ōzono
- Shiori Kubo
- Tamami Sakaguchi
- Kaede Satō
- Reno Nakamura
- Hazuki Mukai
- Mizuki Yamashita
- Ayano Christie Yoshida
- Yūki Yoda

"Zabun Zazabun"

Yūki Yoda and Ayame Tsutsui participate in the song.

"Sa~ Yu~ Ready?"

Sayuri Matsumura participates in the song as her graduation solo song.

"Sabita Compass"

All 13 members who do not participate in the main song (under members) (not include fourth generation) participate in the song. Rena Yamazaki served as the center position for the first time. Junna Itō, and Miria Watanabe participate as their last single from the group.

- Junna Itō
- Riria Itō
- Hinako Kitano
- Tamami Sakaguchi
- Kaede Satō
- Ayane Suzuki
- Ranze Terada
- Reno Nakamura
- Hazuki Mukai
- Rena Yamazaki (center)
- Ayano Christie Yoshida
- Miria Watanabe
- Maaya Wada

"Nekojita Camomile Tea"

All 16 members from fourth generation members participate in the song. Mayu Tamura served as the center position for the first time.

- Sakura Endō
- Haruka Kaki
- Sayaka Kakehashi
- Saya Kanagawa
- Yuri Kitagawa
- Haruka Kuromi
- Rika Satō
- Yuna Shibata
- Rei Seimiya
- Mayu Tamura (center)
- Ayame Tsutsui
- Seira Hayakawa
- Runa Hayashi
- Miyu Matsuo
- Mio Yakubo
- Nao Yumiki

== Accolades ==
Awards and nominations for "Gomen ne Fingers Crossed"
Ceremony	Year	Award	Result	Ref.
Japan Gold Disc Award	2022	Best 5 Singles	Won	

== Charts ==
=== Weekly charts ===
Chart performance for "Gomen ne Fingers Crossed"
Chart (2021)	Peak position
Japan (Japan Hot 100)	1
Japan (Oricon)	1
Japan Combined Singles (Oricon)	1
Japanese Digital Albums (Oricon)	1

=== Monthly charts ===
Monthly chart performance for "Gomen ne Fingers Crossed"
Chart (2021)	Position
Japan (Oricon)	1

=== Year-end charts ===
Year-end chart performance for "Gomen ne Fingers Crossed"
Chart (2021)	Position
Japan Top Singles Sales (Billboard Japan)	4
Japan (Oricon)	6

== Certifications ==
Sales certifications for "Gomen ne Fingers Crossed"
Region	Certification	Certified units/sales
Japan (RIAJ)	3× Platinum	750,000^{^}
^{^} Shipments figures based on certification alone.

== Release history ==
Release dates and formats for "Gomen ne Fingers Crossed"
Country	Date	Format	Version	Catalog number	Label	Ref.
Various	June 2, 2021	Digital download; streaming	Special	—N/a	N46Div.; Sony Music Japan	
Japan	June 9, 2021	CD; Blu-ray	Type-A	SRCL-11836/7	N46Div.; Sony Music Japan	
Japan	June 9, 2021	CD; Blu-ray	Type-B	SRCL-11838/9	N46Div.; Sony Music Japan	
Japan	June 9, 2021	CD; Blu-ray	Type-C	SRCL-11840/1	N46Div.; Sony Music Japan	
Japan	June 9, 2021	CD; Blu-ray	Type-D	SRCL-11842/3	N46Div.; Sony Music Japan	
Japan	June 9, 2021	CD	Regular	SRCL-11844	N46Div.; Sony Music Japan	

== See also ==
- List of Oricon number-one singles of 2021
- List of Hot 100 number-one singles of 2021 (Japan)
