= Stand Up Start =

Japanese manga series

- First tankōbon volume cover

スタンドUPスタート (Sutando Appu Sutāto)
- Manga
- Written by: Shū Fukuda
- Published by: Shueisha
- Imprint: Young Jump Comics
- Magazine: Weekly Young Jump
- Original run: June 18, 2020 – November 9, 2023
- Volumes: 13
- Television drama
- Directed by: Toichiro Ruto; Shinji Kuma; Masayuki Matoba; Toshiya Matsushita
- Produced by: Yūki Seike; Tomoyuki Shojima
- Written by: Moral; Date-san
- Music by: Eishi Segawa
- Studio: Fuji Television
- Original network: FNS (Fuji TV)
- Original run: January 18, 2023 – March 29, 2023
- Episodes: 11
- icon

Stand Up Start (Japanese: スタンドUPスタート, Hepburn: Sutando Appu Sutāto) is a Japanese manga series written and illustrated by Shū Fukuda. It was serialized in Shueisha's seinen manga magazine Weekly Young Jump from June 2020 to November 2023, with its chapters collected in 13 tankōbon volumes. An 11-episode television drama adaptation was broadcast on Fuji TV from January to March 2023.

== Media ==
=== Manga ===
Written and illustrated by Shū Fukuda, Stand Up Start was serialized in Shueisha's seinen manga magazine Weekly Young Jump from June 18, 2020, to November 9, 2023. Shueisha collected its chapters in thirteen individual tankōbon volumes, released from October 16, 2020, to December 19, 2023.

==== Volumes ====
No.	Japanese release date	Japanese ISBN
1	October 16, 2020	978-4-08-891669-9
2	January 19, 2021	978-4-08-891756-6
3	May 19, 2021	978-4-08-891885-3
4	August 18, 2021	978-4-08-892053-5
5	November 19, 2021	978-4-08-892140-2
6	March 18, 2022	978-4-08-892250-8
7	June 17, 2022	978-4-08-892330-7
8	September 16, 2022	978-4-08-892426-7
9	December 19, 2022	978-4-08-892540-0
10	March 17, 2023	978-4-08-892625-4
11	June 19, 2023	978-4-08-892851-7
12	September 19, 2023	978-4-08-892888-3
13	December 19, 2023	978-4-08-893038-1

=== Drama ===
An 11-episode television drama adaptation was broadcast on Fuji TV from January 18 to March 29, 2023. The series' theme song is "Bet on Me" by Juju.
