= Shiawase no Hogoshoku =

2020 single by Nogizaka46

- Type A cover

Single by Nogizaka46

from the album Time Flies
- B-side: "Sayonara Stay With Me"; "Jyāne" (Type-A); "Anastasia" (Type-B); "Mainichi ga Brand New Day" (Type-C); "I See..." (Type-D); "Fantastic Sanshoku Pan" (Regular)
- Released: 25 March 2020 (Japan)
- Genre: J-pop
- Label: N46Div.
- Producer: Yasushi Akimoto

Nogizaka46 singles chronology
"Yoake Made Tsuyogaranakutemoii" (2019)	"Shiawase no Hogoshoku" (2020)	"Sekaijū no Rinjin yo" (2020)

Music video
- "Shiwase no Hogoshoku" on YouTube "Jyāne" on YouTube "Anastasia" on YouTube "Mainichi ga Brand new day" on YouTube "I see…" on YouTube

"Shiawase no Hogoshoku" (Japanese: しあわせの保護色; literally "The Protective Coloration of Happiness", or more colloquially "Happiness in Disguise") is the 25th single by Japanese idol group Nogizaka46. The single was released on 25 March 2020.

The center position of the title track was held by Mai Shiraishi. This single was intended to be the last one that Shiraishi performs in before she leaves Nogizaka46, and as such was written as a tribute to her; however, she delayed her graduation due to the COVID-19 pandemic and was present in "Sekaijū no Rinjin yo", the next song released. Shiraishi also wrote and performed solo the Type-A coupling song "Jyāne" (じゃあね; lit. 'See you again'), marking the first time someone other than Yasushi Akimoto has written a song for Nogizaka46.

== Release ==
This single will be released in 5 versions. Type-A, Type-B, Type-C, Type-D and a regular edition.

== Track listing ==
=== Type-A ===
CD
No.	Title	Lyrics	Music	Arrangement	Length
1.	"Shiawase no Hogoshoku" (しあわせの保護色)	Yasushi Akimoto	Masanori Ura	Seiji Muto	5:05
2.	"Sayonara Stay With Me" (サヨナラ Stay with me)	Yasushi Akimoto	Satori Shiraishi	Satori Shiraishi	3:53
3.	"Jyāne." (じゃあね。)	Mai Shiraishi	Kenta Urashima, U-Shing	Hiroto Kikuchi	6:19
4.	"Shiawase no Hogoshoku" (off vocal ver.)		Masanori Ura	Seiji Muto	5:05
5.	"Sayonara Stay With Me" (off vocal ver.)		Satori Shiraishi	Satori Shiraishi	3:53
6.	"Jyāne" (off vocal ver.)		Kenta Urashima, U-Shing	Hiroto Kikuchi	6:18
Total length:					33:57

Blu-ray
No.	Title	Director(s)	Length
1.	"Shiawase no Hogoshoku Music Video"	Kazuma Ikeda
2.	"Jyāne. Music Video"	Hiroaki Yuasa
3.	"Haruka Kuromi, Rika Saitō, Runa Hayashi Individual PVs"

=== Type-B ===
CD
No.	Title	Lyrics	Music	Arrangement	Length
1.	"Shiawase no Hogoshoku"	Yasushi Akimoto	Masanori Ura	Seiji Muto	5:05
2.	"Sayonara Stay With Me"	Yasushi Akimoto	Satori Shiraishi	Satori Shiraishi	3:53
3.	"Anastasia" (アナスターシャ)	Yasushi Akimoto	Daisuke Nakamura	Daisuke Nakamura	4:51
4.	"Shiawase no Hogoshoku" (off vocal ver.)		Masanori Ura	Seiji Muto	5:05
5.	"Sayonara Stay With Me" (off vocal ver.)		Satori Shiraishi	Satori Shiraishi	3:53
6.	"Anastasia" (off vocal ver.)		Daisuke Nakamura	Daisuke Nakamura	4:50
Total length:					31:01

Blu-ray
No.	Title	Director(s)	Length
1.	"Shiawase no Hogoshoku Music Video"	Kazuma Ikeda
2.	"Anastasia Music Video"	Shuto Itō
3.	"Miyu Matsuo, Nao Yumiki Individual PVs"

=== Type-C ===
CD
No.	Title	Lyrics	Music	Arrangement	Length
1.	"Shiawase no Hogoshoku"	Yasushi Akimoto	Masanori Ura	Seiji Muto	5:05
2.	"Sayonara Stay With Me"	Yasushi Akimoto	Satori Shiraishi	Satori Shiraishi	3:53
3.	"Mainichi ga Brand New Day" (毎日がBrand new day)	Yasushi Akimoto	APAZZI	APAZZI	4:19
4.	"Shiawase no Hogoshoku" (off vocal ver.)		Masanori Ura	Seiji Muto	5:05
5.	"Sayonara Stay With Me" (off vocal ver.)		Satori Shiraishi	Satori Shiraishi	3:53
6.	"Mainichi ga Brand New Day" (off vocal ver.)		APAZZI	APAZZI	4:17
Total length:					29:56

Blu-ray
No.	Title	Director(s)	Length
1.	"Shiawase no Hogoshoku Music Video"	Kazuma Ikeda
2.	"Mainichi ga Brand New Day Music Video"	Mitsunori Yokobori
3.	"Shiraishi Mai: Sayonara o Arigatō (Part 1)"

=== Type-D ===
CD
No.	Title	Lyrics	Music	Arrangement	Length
1.	"Shiawase no Hogoshoku"	Yasushi Akimoto	Masanori Ura	Seiji Muto	5:05
2.	"Sayonara Stay With Me"	Yasushi Akimoto	Satori Shiraishi	Satori Shiraishi	3:53
3.	"I see…"	Yasushi Akimoto	youth case	Hirofumi Sasaki	3:59
4.	"Shiawase no Hogoshoku" (off vocal ver.)		Masanori Ura	Seiji Muto	5:05
5.	"Sayonara Stay With Me" (off vocal ver.)		Satori Shiraishi	Satori Shiraishi	3:53
6.	"I see..." (off vocal ver.)		youth case	Hirofumi Sasaki	3:57
Total length:					29:16

Blu-ray
No.	Title	Director(s)	Length
1.	"Shiawase no Hogoshoku Music Video"	Kazuma Ikeda
2.	"I see… Music Video"	Yūki Kamiya
3.	"Shiraishi Mai: Sayonara o Arigatō (Part 2)"

=== Regular Edition ===
CD
No.	Title	Lyrics	Music	Arrangement	Length
1.	"Shiawase no Hogoshoku"	Yasushi Akimoto	Masanori Ura	Seiji Muto	5:05
2.	"Sayonara Stay With Me"	Yasushi Akimoto	Satori Shiraishi	Satori Shiraishi	3:53
3.	"Fantastic Sanshoku Pan" (ファンタスティック三色パン)	Yasushi Akimoto	Jintsuchihashi	Jintsuchihashi	3:38
4.	"Shiawase no Hogoshoku" (off vocal ver.)		Masanori Ura	Seiji Muto	5:05
5.	"Sayonara Stay With Me" (off vocal ver.)		Satori Shiraishi	Satori Shiraishi	3:53
6.	"Fantastic Sanshoku Pan" (off vocal ver.)		Jintsuchihashi	Jintsuchihashi	3:37
Total length:					28:35

=== Special Edition ===
Digital download, streaming
No.	Title	Lyrics	Music	Arrangement	Length
1.	"Shiawase no Hogoshoku"	Yasushi Akimoto	Masanori Ura	Seiji Muto	5:05
2.	"Sayonara Stay With Me"	Yasushi Akimoto	Satori Shiraishi	Satori Shiraishi	3:53
3.	"Jyāne."	Mai Shiraishi	Kenta Urashima, U-Shing	Hiroto Kikuchi	6:19
4.	"Anastasia"	Yasushi Akimoto	Daisuke Nakamura	Daisuke Nakamura	4:51
5.	"Mainichi ga Brand New Day"	Yasushi Akimoto	APAZZI	APAZZI	4:19
6.	"I see…"	Yasushi Akimoto	youth case	Hirofumi Sasaki	3:59
7.	"Fantastic Sanshoku Pan"	Yasushi Akimoto	Jintsuchihashi	Jintsuchihashi	3:38
Total length:					33:46

== Participating members ==
=== "Shiawase no Hogoshoku" ===
Mai Shiraishi holds the center position. Additionally, all first generation members are chosen to perform in this song.

- Third row: Haruka Kaki, Mai Shinuchi, Mizuki Yamashita, Shiori Kubo, Miona Hori, Momoko Ōzono, Sakura Endō, Renka Iwamoto, Yūki Yoda, Hinako Kitano, Minami Umezawa
- Second row: Sayuri Inoue, Maaya Wada, Kazumi Takayama, Manatsu Akimoto, Hina Higuchi, Kana Nakada
- First row: Asuka Saitō, Erika Ikuta, Mai Shiraishi, Sayuri Matsumura, Minami Hoshino

=== "Sayonara Stay With Me" ===
Manatsu Akimoto, Erika Ikuta, Asuka Saitō, Sayuri Matsumura, Shiori Kubo, Yūki Yoda, Sakura Endo, Haruka Kaki

=== "Jyāne" ===
Mai Shiraishi

=== "Anastasia" ===
All second generation members

=== "Mainichi ga Brand New Day ===
All third generation members

=== "I see" ===
All fourth generation members

=== "Fantastic Sanshoku Pan" ===
Asuka Saitō, Minami Umezawa, Mizuki Yamashita

== Charts ==
=== Weekly charts ===
Chart (2020)	Peak position
Japan (Oricon)	1
Japan Hot 100 (Billboard)	1
Taiwan (G-music)	3

=== Year-end charts ===
Chart (2020)	Position
Japan (Oricon)	4
Japan Hot 100 (Billboard)	46

== Certifications ==
Certifications for "Shiawase no Hogoshoku"
Region	Certification	Certified units/sales
Japan (RIAJ)	Million	1,000,000^{^}
^{^} Shipments figures based on certification alone.
