= Koiochi Flag =

2021 song by SKE48

Single by SKE48
- Released: February 3, 2021
- Genre: Pop
- Length: 4:29
- Label: Avex Trax
- Composer(s): Nobuaki Tanaka
- Lyricist(s): Yasushi Akimoto
- Producer(s): Nobuaki Tanaka

SKE48 singles chronology
"Sōyūtoko Aru yo ne?" (2020)	"Koiochi Flag" (2021)	"Anogoro no Kimi wo Mitsuketa" (2021)

Music video
- "Koiochi Flag" on YouTube

"Koiochi Flag" (恋落ちフラグ, Fall-in-Love Flag) is the 27th single by Japanese girl group SKE48. It was released digitally and as a CD single on February 3, 2021, by Avex Trax. The song was written by Yasushi Akimoto and produced by Nobuaki Tanaka. Musically, it is a pop song. A music video premiered on January 12, 2021, to accompany the release of the song.

Upon release, the song peaked at number one on both the Oricon Singles Chart and Japan Hot 100. It was eventually certified platinum by the Recording Industry Association of Japan (RIAJ).

== Background and release ==
In November 2020, SKE48 announced the release of the single, "Koiochi Flag" to commemorate the graduation of member Jurina Matsui. It is a pop song with lyrics about friendship. The single was made available digitally as an EP, on February 3, 2021, by Avex Trax. The physical version was also released the same day in three editions: Regular, First press limited, and Seven net limited. Each edition was made available in CD+DVD formats in three types: A, B, and C; each type contains the single "Koiochi Flag" on the A-side. Additionally, type A includes "Memories 〜Itsunohika aeru made〜" and the instrumentals of both tracks on B-side, type B contains "Change Your World", while C has "Anogoro no rokkā". The DVD features music videos and bonus videos of the tracks. A live version of the single, which includes "Koiochi Flag" and "Oto no wareta chaimu" was released in Japan.

== Commercial performance ==
"Koiochi Flag" was a commercial success in Japan. The single took the number one spot on its first day of release on Oricon Daily Singles Chart, selling 5,188 physical copies. The single peaked at number one on the Oricon Weekly Singles Chart, on the chart issue dated February 9, 2021, selling 191,000 copies in its opening week. It became SKE48's 23rd consecutive chart-topper, making them the fifth female artist in history to achieve this. It has been certified platinum by the Recording Industry Association of Japan (RIAJ) for sales exceeding 250,000 copies.

"Koiochi Flag" sold debuted at number one on the Japan Hot 100 chart on February 10, 2021, selling 17,897 digital downloads. The single recorded 196,556 copies in the tracking week, which was highest sales for that week.

== Music video and promotion ==
The accompanying music video premiered on SKE48's YouTube channel on January 12, 2021. The video shows the members performing choreography in multiple groups. To promote the song, the group performed it live on the release day.

== Track listing ==
Digital download
No.	Title	Lyrics	Music	Arrangement	Length
1.	"Koiochi Flag" (恋落ちフラグ)	Yasushi Akimoto	Nobuaki Tanaka	Nobuaki Tanaka	4:29
2.	"Memories 〜Itsunohika aeru made〜" (Memories 〜いつの日か会えるまで〜)	Jurina Matsui	Jurina Matsui	Takanori Fukuda	4:50
3.	"Change Your World"	Jurina Matsui	Yamada Tomokazu	APAZZI	3:54
4.	"Ano Koro no Locker" (あの頃のロッカー)	Yasushi Akimoto	Language; Note Native	APAZZI	4:51
5.	"Oto no Wareta Chime" (音の割れたチャイム)	Yasushi Akimoto	Kengo Ohama	Nonaka "Masa" Yuichi	3:17
Total length:					21:21

CD single – Type A
No.	Title	Lyrics	Music	Arrangement	Length
1.	"Koiochi Flag" (恋落ちフラグ)	Yasushi Akimoto	Nobuaki Tanaka	Nobuaki Tanaka	4:29
2.	"Memories 〜Itsunohika aeru made〜" (Memories 〜いつの日か会えるまで〜)	Jurina Matsui	Jurina Matsui	Takanori Fukuda	4:50
3.	"Koiochi Flag" (instrumental)		Nobuaki Tanaka	Nobuaki Tanaka	4:29
4.	"Memories 〜Itsunohika aeru made〜" (instrumental)		Takanori Fukuda	Takanori Fukuda	4:50
5.	"Koiochi Flag" (music video)
6.	"Memories 〜Itsunohika aeru made〜" (music video)
7.	"Jurina Matsui 12 Years Trajectory 2008–2020" (bonus video)
Total length:					25:03

CD single – Type B
No.	Title	Lyrics	Music	Arrangement	Length
1.	"Koiochi Flag" (恋落ちフラグ)	Yasushi Akimoto	Nobuaki Tanaka	Nobuaki Tanaka	4:29
2.	"Change Your World"	Jurina Matsui	Yamada Tomokazu	APAZZI	3:54
3.	"Koiochi Flag" (instrumental)		Nobuaki Tanaka	Nobuaki Tanaka	4:29
4.	"Change Your World" (instrumental)		Yamada Tomokazu	APAZZI	3:54
5.	"Koiochi Flag" (music video)
6.	"Change Your World" (music video)
7.	"Change Your World music video documentary & SKE48 theater debut" (12th Anniversary Special Live)
Total length:					16:50

CD single – Type C
No.	Title	Lyrics	Music	Arrangement	Length
1.	"Koiochi Flag" (恋落ちフラグ)	Yasushi Akimoto	Nobuaki Tanaka	Nobuaki Tanaka	4:29
2.	"Ano Koro no Locker" (あの頃のロッカー)	Yasushi Akimoto	Language; Note Native	APAZZI	4:51
3.	"Koiochi Flag" (instrumental)		Nobuaki Tanaka	Nobuaki Tanaka	4:29
4.	"Ano Koro no Locker" (instrumental)		Language; Note Native	APAZZI	4:51
5.	"Koiochi Flag" (music video)
6.	"Ano Koro no Locker" (music video)
7.	"Koiochi Flag" (music video documentary)
Total length:					18:46

Live version
No.	Title	Lyrics	Music	Arrangement	Length
1.	"Koiochi Flag" (恋落ちフラグ)	Yasushi Akimoto	Nobuaki Tanaka	Nobuaki Tanaka	4:29
2.	"Oto no Wareta Chime" (音の割れたチャイム)	Yasushi Akimoto	Kengo Ohama	Nonaka "Masa" Yuichi	3:17
3.	"Koiochi Flag" (instrumental)		Nobuaki Tanaka	Nobuaki Tanaka	4:29
4.	"Oto no Wareta Chime" (instrumental)		Kengo Ohama	Nonaka "Masa" Yuichi	3:17

== Charts ==
=== Weekly charts ===
Weekly chart performance for "Koiochi Flag"
Chart (2021)	Peak position
Japan (Oricon)	1
Japan (Japan Hot 100)	1

=== Year-end charts ===
Year-end chart performance for "Koiochi Flag"
Chart (2021)	Position
Japan (Oricon)	25

== Certifications ==
Region	Certification	Certified units/sales
Japan (RIAJ)	Platinum	250,000^{^}
^{^} Shipments figures based on certification alone.
