= Mizuki Yamashita =

Japanese actress and fashion model

- 山下 美月
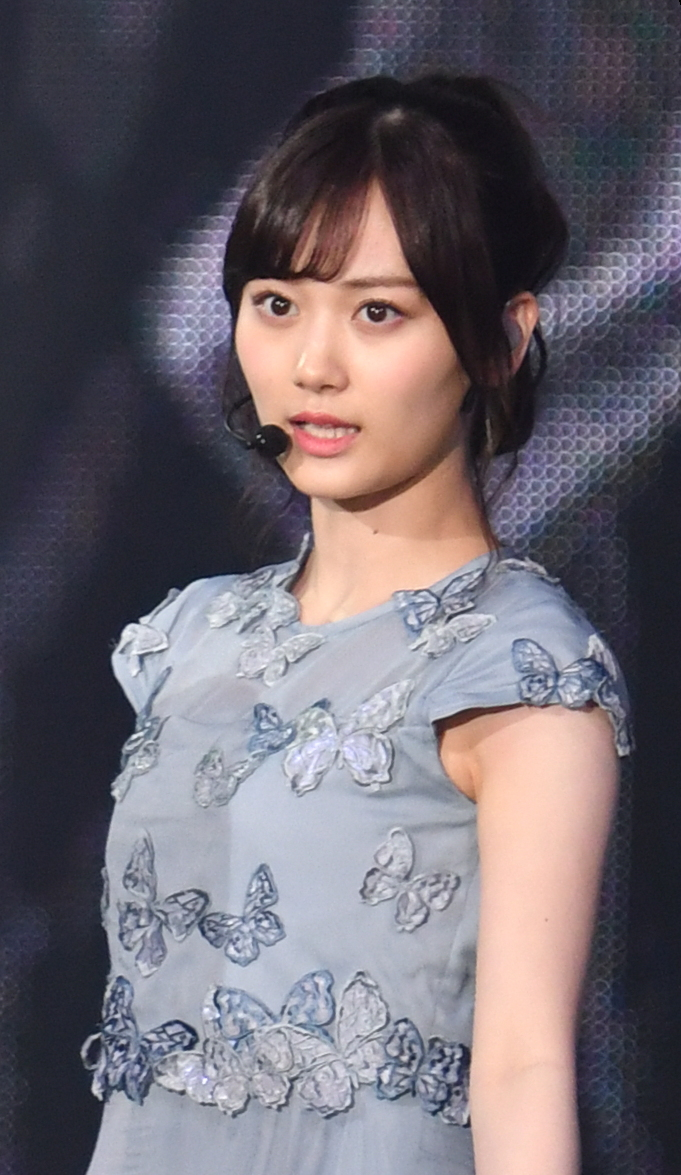
- Yamashita in January 2019
- Born: July 26, 1999 (age 27); Tokyo, Japan
- Other names: Yama (やま); Zukkie (づっきー)
- Occupations: Actress; fashion model
- Years active: 2016–present
- Agent: Nogizaka46.LLC
- Notable work: Cheers to Miki Clinic; Video Girl Mai
- Musical career
- Genre: J-pop
- Instruments: Vocals
- Years active: 2016–2024
- Label: Sony Records/N46Div
- Formerly of: Nogizaka46

Signature
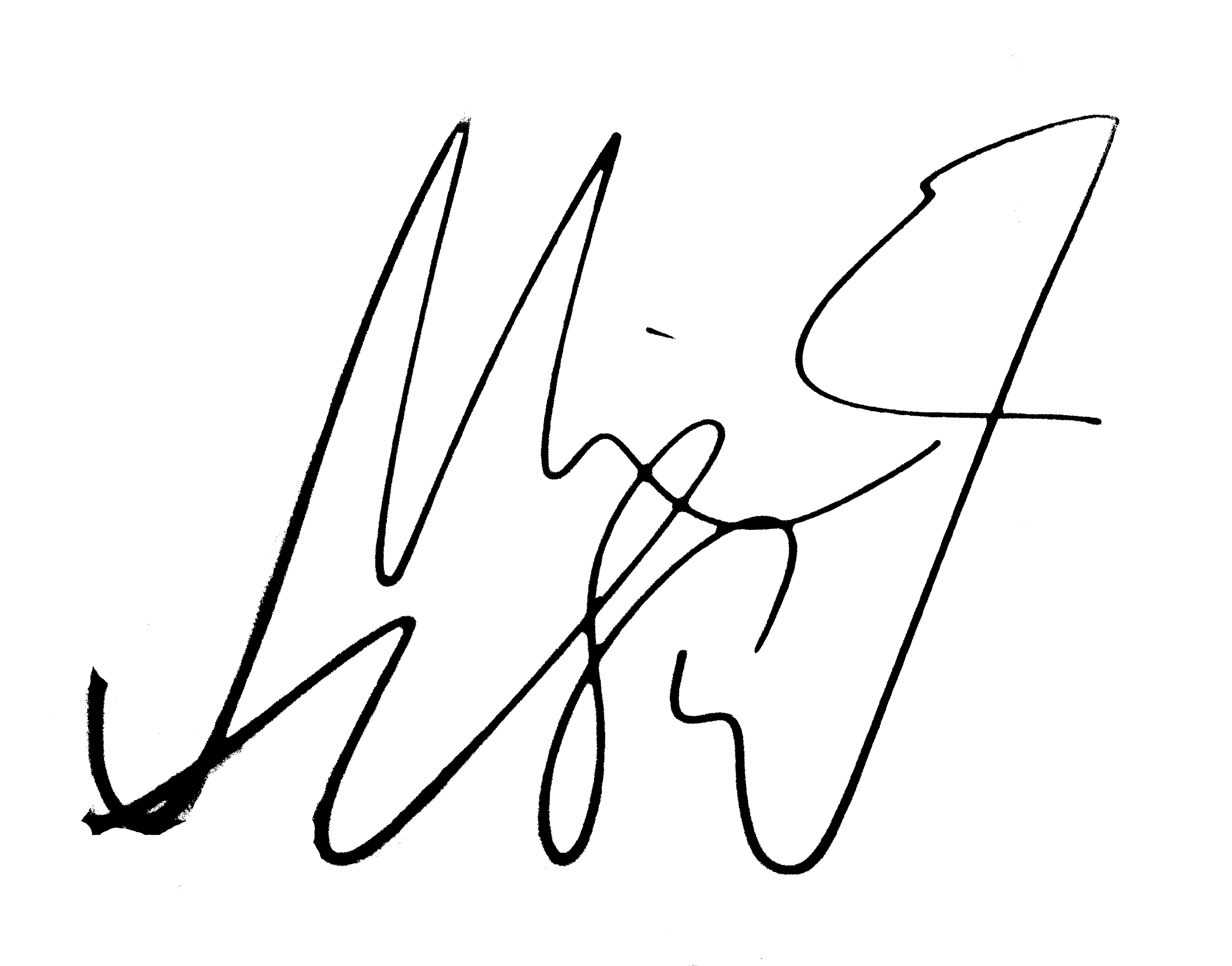

Mizuki Yamashita (山下 美月, Yamashita Mizuki; born July 26, 1999), is a Japanese actress and fashion model. She is a former third generation member of the girl group Nogizaka46 and an exclusive model for CanCam magazine. Her acting roles include the supporting role of Mami Ichinose in the BS TV Tokyo series Cheers to Miki Clinic, the lead role of Mai Kamio in the 2019 TV Tokyo adaptation of Video Girl Ai, and the lead role of Reiko Nonoyama in the 2021 TV Tokyo drama The Other Woman.

== Early life ==
Yamashita was born on July 26, 1999, in Tokyo. Her entertainment career began in 2016 when she successfully auditioned for the third generation of the idol group Nogizaka46. Yamashita and her fellow third generation members performed their first full live concert in May 2017.

== Career ==
=== Nogizaka46 ===
Yamashita's first selection for Nogizaka46's main performance group came in March 2018, when she was selected for Nogizaka46's twentieth single "Synchronicity". She has since been selected for the main performance groups for several more of the group's singles, including the twenty-first single "Jikochu de Ikō!" and twenty-second single "Kaerimichi wa Tōmawari Shitaku Naru". Yamashita served as the choreographic center for Nogizaka46's 26th single "Boku wa Boku o Suki ni Naru", released in January 2021.

Yamashita became an exclusive model for the fashion magazine CanCam in August 2018, joining her fellow Nogizaka46 member Sayuri Matsumura as a CanCam model. Yamashita's first photobook, titled Wasurerarenai Hito (lit. Unforgettable Person), was published by Shogakukan in January 2020. The photobook sold over 100,000 copies in the first week after publication, and ranked first in weekly sales in the Oricon photobook and general book categories. She has also been selected to appear with other Nogizaka46 members in advertising campaigns for Mouse Computer, 7-Eleven, Fanta, Pokémon Go, and Cup Star. Yamashita announced her graduation from Nogizaka46 on February 17, 2024, with the upcoming 35th single being her last participating single with the group and a graduation concert is scheduled for May 11 and 12.

=== Acting ===
Yamashita made her acting debut in 2018 with a minor role in the film Every Day a Good Day, an adaptation of Noriko Morishita's essay about finding happiness through the Japanese tea ceremony. Two stage roles followed, with Yamashita appearing in a stage adaptation of Sailor Moon alongside fellow Nogizaka46 members, and in the horror play Zambi alongside several members of Nogizaka46 and Keyakizaka46. In 2019, after reprising her Zambi stage role for the Nippon TV adaptation of the play, Yamashita played the supporting role of nurse Mami Ichinose in the 2019 BS TV Tokyo ensemble drama Cheers to Miki Clinic (神酒クリニックで乾杯を, Miki Kurinikku de Kanpai o), an adaptation of the novel of the same name by mystery writer Mikito Chinen.

Her first lead role came in the TV Tokyo series Video Girl Mai (電影少女 -VIDEO GIRL MAI 2019-, Denei Shōjo: Video Girl Mai 2019). The series continued TV Tokyo's previous live-action adaptation of the manga Video Girl Ai, which starred Nanase Nishino as Ai, but focused on a new main character, Mai Kamio, played by Yamashita. Later that year she joined the cast of the live-action film adaptation of the manga Eizouken ni wa Te o Dasu na! alongside fellow Nogizaka46 members Asuka Saitō and Minami Umezawa. Yamashita played the lead role of Reiko Nonoyama in the 2021 TV Tokyo drama The Other Woman (じゃない方の彼女, Janaihō no Kanojo), which was originally conceived by Yasushi Akimoto.

Yamashita also continued playing supporting roles. In the NHK asadora Maiagare! she played Kurumi Mochizuki, a friend of the protagonist Mai since childhood, with Saki Ōno playing Mochizuki as a child and Yamashita playing Mochizuki as an adult. She joined the cast of the 2023 Fuji TV live-action adaptation of the manga Stand Up Start as Yoshino Haga, a conscientious bank employee.

== Filmography ==
=== Films ===
Year	Title	Role	Notes	Ref(s)
2018	Every Day a Good Day	Hitomi		
2020	Keep Your Hands Off Eizouken!	Tsubame Mizusaki		
2024	6 Lying University Students	Tsubasa Yashiro		
2025	Detective Conan: One-Eyed Flashback	Madoka Marui (voice)		
2025	My Love Story with Yamada-kun at Lv999	Akane Kinoshita	Lead role	
2025	The Bird Is Calling	Yuriko Kuki		
2025	Baka's Identity	Kisara Makihara		
2025	New Interpretation of the End of Edo Period	Kunoichi		
2026	Kingdom 5: The Clash of Souls	Yang		
2026	F(r)iction			

=== Television ===
Year	Title	Role	Notes	Ref(s)
2019	Zambi	Yui Kanemura		
2019	Cheers to Miki Clinic	Mami Ichinose		
2019	Video Girl Mai	Mai Kamio	Lead role	
2021	The Other Woman	Reiko Nonoyama	Lead role	
2022–23	Maiagare!	Kurumi Mochizuki	Asadora	
2023	Stand Up Start	Yoshino Haga		
2024	Eye Love You	Mahiro Ikemoto		
2024	A Suffocatingly Lonely Death	Tōko Mori		
2026	Rock Paper Landmine	Nieko Saburi		

=== Theater ===
Year	Title	Notes	Ref(s)
2018	Pretty Guardian Sailor Moon		
2018	Zambi		

== Photobooks ==
- 須江, 隆治 (2020). 忘れられない人 : 山下美月1st写真集 [Unforgettable Person: Mizuki Yamashita 1st Photobook] (in Japanese). Shogakukan. ISBN 9784096823248.
