= NiziU discography =

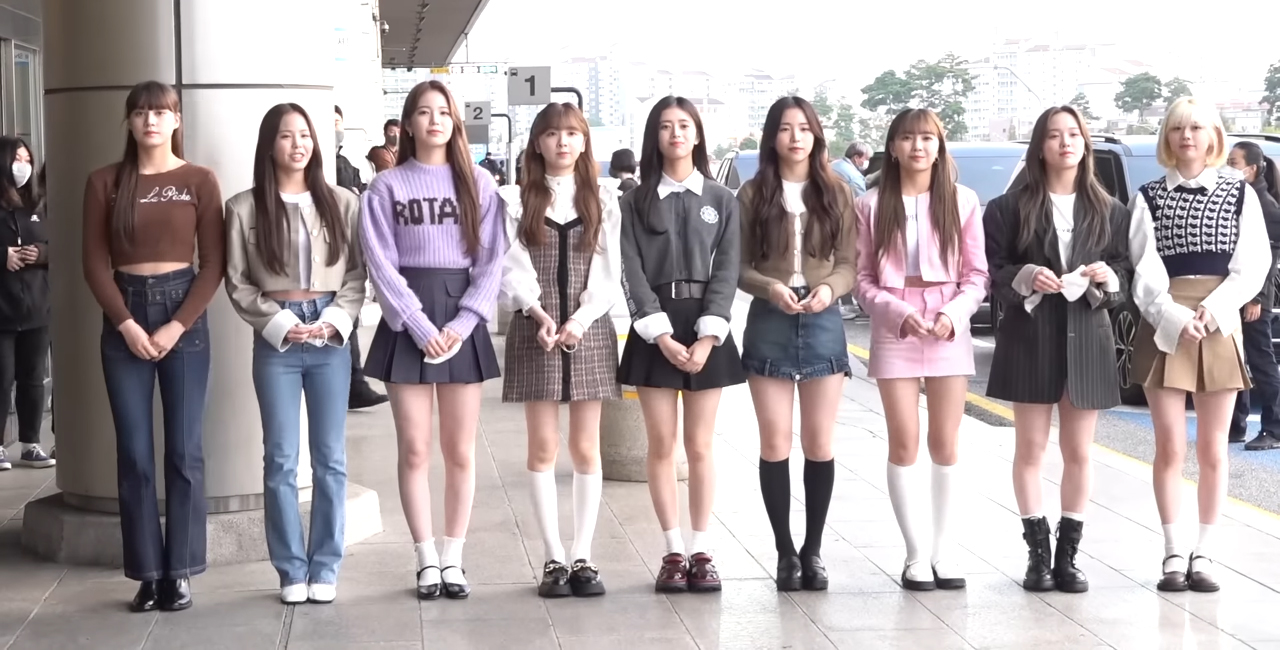
- NiziU in October 2022
- Studio albums: 2
- EPs: 3
- Single albums: 2
- Singles: 20

Japanese girl group NiziU has released two studio albums, three extended plays, two single albums, and twenty singles. As of December 2024, the group had sold approximately 3.3 million album and single copies in Japan.

Prior to their debut, the group released the digital extended play Make You Happy in June 2020. They made their official debut in November 2020, with the maxi single "Step and a Step". The single debuted on the top of the Oricon Singles Chart and Billboard Japan Hot 100 chart, and received a platinum certification for physical sales and gold certification for digital sales, with approximately 500,000 copies sold in total. Additionally, it also received a platinum certification for streaming.

The group's debut studio album, U, topped both the Oricon Albums Chart and the Billboard Japan Hot Albums chart, and received a platinum certification for physical sales, with approximately 250,000 copies sold.

== Studio albums ==
List of studio albums, with selected details, chart positions, sales and certifications
Title	Details	Peak chart positions			Sales	Certifications
Title	Details	JPN	JPN Cmb.	JPN Hot	Sales	Certifications
U	Released: November 24, 2021; Label: Epic Japan; Formats: CD, digital download, streaming	1	1	1	JPN: 232,434 (phy.); JPN: 10,754 (dig.)	RIAJ: Platinum (phy.)
Coconut	Released: July 19, 2023; Label: Epic Japan; Formats: CD, digital download, streaming	1	1	1	JPN: 197,288 (phy.)	RIAJ: Platinum (phy.)
New Emotion	Released: November 19, 2025; Label: Epic Japan; Formats: CD, digital download, streaming; Track listing: 1. "♡Emotion"; 2. "Yoake"; 3. "Come On Over"; 4. "Shining Day"; 5. "Rise Up"; 6. "Believe"; 7. "Too Much" (Rio, Maya, Nina); 8. "Villain" (Mako, Mayuka, Rima); 9. "That's Me"; 10. "Tip-Top"; 11. "Fairy Magic" (Riku, Ayaka, Miihi); 12. "Love Line" (Japanese version); 13. "What If" (Japanese version); 14. "Happy Day"	1	1	2	JPN: 178,644	RIAJ: Gold (phy.)

== Compilation albums ==
List of compilation albums, with selected details, chart positions, sales and certifications
Title	Details	Peak chart positions			Sales	Certifications
Title	Details	JPN	JPN Cmb.	JPN Hot	Sales	Certifications
Portfolio	Released: July 1, 2026; Label: Epic Japan; Formats: CD, digital download, streaming	2	2	1	JPN: 80,637	RIAJ: Gold (phy.)

== Extended plays ==
List of extended plays, with selected details, chart positions, sales and certifications
Title	Details	Peak chart positions					Sales	Certifications
Title	Details	JPN	JPN Cmb.	JPN Hot	KOR	UK Dig.	Sales	Certifications
Make You Happy	Released: June 30, 2020; Label: Epic Japan; Formats: Digital download, streaming	— (Note: Make You Happy did not enter the Oricon Albums Chart, but peaked at number 1 on the Oricon Digital Albums Chart.)	1	1	—	—	JPN: 118,190 (dig.)	RIAJ: Gold (dig.)
Rise Up	Released: July 24, 2024; Label: Epic Japan; Formats: CD, digital download, streaming; Track listing: 1. "Rise Up"; 2. "Believe"; 3. "Rise Up" (Instrumental); 4. "Believe" (Instrumental)	1	1	1	—	—	JPN: 223,580 (phy.)	RIAJ: Platinum (phy.)
Awake	Released: February 5, 2025; Label: Epic Japan; Formats: CD, digital download, streaming; Track listing: 1. "Yoake"; 2. "Sweet Nonfiction"; 3. "Buddy Buddy"; 4. "Made of Love"; 5. "Life Is Beautiful"; 6. "Crush"; 7. "Memories"; 8. "Always"	1	1	1	—	38	JPN: 225,200 (phy.)	RIAJ: Platinum (phy.)
Good Girl but Not for You	Released: April 1, 2026; Label: Epic Japan; Formats: CD, digital download, streaming	1	1	2	—	—	JPN: 192,020 (phy.)	RIAJ: Platinum (phy.)
Sour Grapes	Released: September 28, 2026; Label: JYP; Formats: CD, digital download, streaming	17	13	—	5	—	JPN: 4,437 (phy.); KOR: 248,421 (phy.)	
"—" denotes a recording that did not chart or was not released in that territory.

== Single albums ==
List of single albums with selected details, chart positions and sales
Title	Details	Peak chart positions		Sales
Title	Details	JPN Cmb.	KOR	Sales
Press Play	Released: October 30, 2023; Label: JYP; Formats: CD, digital download, streaming; Track listing: 1. "Heartris"; 2. "Lucky Star"; 3. "Paradise" (Korean version)	7	5	KOR: 159,599
Love Line	Released: March 31, 2025; Label: JYP; Formats: CD, digital download, streaming; Track listing: 1. "Love Line"; 2. "What If"	39	3	KOR: 168,636

== Singles ==
=== Japanese singles ===
List of Japanese singles, with selected chart positions, showing year released, sales, certifications and album name
Title	Year	Peak chart positions				Sales	Certifications	Album
Title	Year	JPN	JPN Cmb.	JPN Hot	WW	Sales	Certifications	Album
"Make You Happy"	2020	— (Note: "Make You Happy" did not enter the Oricon Singles Chart, but peaked at number 1 on the Oricon Digital Singles Chart.)	2	2	129	JPN: 298,027 (dig.)	RIAJ: Platinum (dig.); 3× Platinum (st.)	Make You Happy
"Step and a Step"	2020	1	1	1	75	JPN: 431,994 (phy.); JPN: 80,876 (dig.)	RIAJ: Platinum (phy.); Gold (dig.); Platinum (st.)	U
"Take a Picture"	2021	1	1	1	—	JPN: 366,575 (phy.); JPN: 87,206 (dig.)	RIAJ: Platinum (phy.); Gold (dig.); Platinum (st.)	U
"Poppin' Shakin'"	2021	1	1	7	—	JPN: 366,575 (phy.); JPN: 69,553 (dig.)	RIAJ: Platinum (phy.); Gold (dig.); Platinum (st.)	U
"Super Summer"	2021	— (Note: "Super Summer" did not enter the Oricon Singles Chart, but peaked at number 3 on the Oricon Digital Singles Chart.)	8	8	—	JPN: 22,648 (dig.)		U
"Chopstick"	2021	—	9	7	—		RIAJ: Gold (st.)	U
"Need U"	2021	—	—	80	—			U
"Asobo"	2022	—	9	5	—	JPN: 13,791 (dig.)		Coconut
"Clap Clap"	2022	1	1	1	—	JPN: 197,047 (phy.)	RIAJ: Platinum (phy.)	Coconut
"Blue Moon"	2022	2	2	4	—	JPN: 194,342 (phy.)	RIAJ: Platinum (phy.)	Non-album single
"Paradise"	2023	2	2	1	—	JPN: 185,625 (phy.)	RIAJ: Gold (phy.); Gold (st.)	Coconut
"Coconut"	2023	—	50	30	—			Coconut
"Memories"	2024	—	32	27	—	JPN: 5,197 (dig.)		Awake
"Sweet Nonfiction"	2024	—	23	21	—	JPN: 8,114 (dig.)	RIAJ: Gold (st.)	Awake
"Rise Up"	2024	—	50	46	—	JPN: 2,952 (dig.)		Rise Up
"Always"	2024	—	44	35	—	JPN: 5,851 (dig.)		Awake
"Buddy Buddy"	2024	—	—	85	—	JPN: 1,270 (dig.)		Awake
"Yoake"	2025	—	42	40	—	JPN: 2,420 (dig.)		Awake
"Love Line" (Japanese version)	2025	—	43	—	—			New Emotion
"Shining Day"	2025	—	43	—	—			New Emotion
"What If" (Japanese version)	2025	—	—	60	—	JPN: 1,157 (dig.)		New Emotion
"♡Emotion"	2025	—	42	30	—			New Emotion
"Dear..."	2026	—	—	62	—			Good Girl But Not for You
"Too Bad"	2026	—	—	35	—	JPN: 1,547 (dig.)		Good Girl But Not for You
"—" denotes a recording that did not chart or was not released in that territory.

=== Korean singles ===
List of Korean singles, with selected chart positions, showing year released, sales, certifications and album name
Title	Year	Peak chart positions				Sales	Certifications	Album
Title	Year	JPN Cmb.	JPN Hot	KOR DL	UK Sales	Sales	Certifications	Album
"Heartris"	2023	—	10	94	—	JPN: 13,723 (dig.)	RIAJ: Gold (st.)	Press Play
"Love Line"	2025	39	41	43	84			Love Line
"Sour Grapes"	2026	–	—	9	—			Sour Grapes
"—" denotes a recording that did not chart or was not released in that territory.

== Other charted songs ==
=== Japanese songs ===
List of other charted Japanese songs, with selected chart positions, showing year released, sales, certifications and album name
Title	Year	Peak chart positions		Sales	Certifications	Album
Title	Year	JPN Cmb.	JPN Hot	Sales	Certifications	Album
"Baby I'm a Star"	2020	9	14		RIAJ: Gold (st.)	Make You Happy
"Boom Boom Boom"	2020	10	15		RIAJ: Gold (st.)	Make You Happy
"Beyond the Rainbow" (虹の向こうへ)	2020	12	19		RIAJ: Gold (st.)	Make You Happy
"Sweet Bomb!"	2020	—	42	JPN: 8,850 (dig.)		Step and a Step
"Joyful"	2020	—	44	JPN: 8,476 (dig.)		Step and a Step
"I Am"	2021	—	49	JPN: 7,698 (dig.)		U
"Believe"	2024	—	83			Rise Up
"—" denotes a recording that did not chart or was not released in that territory.

=== Korean songs ===
List of other charted Korean songs, with selected chart positions, showing year released, sales and album name
Title	Year	Peak chart positions	Sales	Album
Title	Year	KOR DL	Sales	Album
"Lucky Star"	2023	170	JPN: 2,447 (dig.)	Press Play
"Paradise" (Korean version)	2023	172		Press Play
"What If"	2025	83		Love Line
"Petal’s Song"	2026	118		Sour Grapes
"emoji"	2026	123		Sour Grapes
"Into The Dawn"	2026	119		Sour Grapes
"Lullaby"	2026	131		Sour Grapes
