= Secret Garden (Oh My Girl song) =

Single by Oh My Girl

from the album Secret Garden
- Released: January 9, 2018
- Recorded: Doobdoob Studio; Seoul Studio
- Genre: K-pop; synth-pop
- Label: WM Entertainment
- Songwriters: Seo Ji-eum; Steven Lee; Mayu Wakisaka; Sean Alexander
- Producer: Steven Lee

Oh My Girl singles chronology
"Coloring Book" (2017)	"Secret Garden" (2018)	"Remember Me" (2018)

Music video
- "Secret Garden" on YouTube

"Secret Garden" (Korean: 비밀정원; RR: Bimiljeongwon) is a song recorded by South Korean girl group Oh My Girl. It was released by WM Entertainment on January 9, 2018, as the lead single for their fifth extended play of the same name (2018).

== Background ==
On October 31, 2017, WM Entertainment announced Oh My Girl's comeback with new music planned for released some time in November. However, in mid-November, it was announced that their comeback would be delayed until January for "a goal of a more complete album". On December 23, WM Entertainment announced Oh My Girl's comeback for January 9 with the single "Secret Garden" along with their fifth EP of the same name.

== Composition ==
The song was written produced by Steven Lee, with additional songwriting by Mayu Wakisaka, and Sean Alexander, and Seo Ji-eum. Alexander has previously been involved in composition and production for their single "Closer", while Seo Ji-eum is the lyricist for several of their previous singles, including "Closer", "Liar Liar", and "Windy Day". It was described by Billboard's Tamar Herman, as "a shimmering synth-pop title track ". The lyrics describe the process of a young girl growing up as "planting the seeds of potential internally to pursue their future dreams".

== Chart performance ==
The song debuted at number 17 on the Gaon Digital Chart, on the week of January 13, 2018. The song charted for 12 consecutive weeks in the Top 100. "Secret Garden" also debuted at number 17 on the Kpop Hot 100 for the week of January 21, 2018. In its second week, the song peaked at number 10.

The song was the 35th best-selling song in January, 46th in February and 74th in March 2018.

== Music video ==
Produced by Sunny Visual for WM Entertainment, the music video of "Secret Garden" was directed by Yoo Sung-kyun. It was uploaded on January 9, 2018, on their official YouTube channel and also 1theK. The video showcases them dancing in a simple white set. Individual scenes reflects the lyrics of the song by depicting the members as young women discovering educational options and exploring career paths.

== Japanese version ==
A Japanese version of "Secret Garden" was released on December 28, 2018, as their second lead single for their debut Japanese album Oh My Girl Japan Debut Album. The album was released on January 9, 2019, by Ariola Japan. The lyrics were translated into Japanese by Chie Itou, who was previously involved in translating the entirety of their Banana Allergy Monkey EP into Japanese.

== Charts ==
Chart (2018)	Peak position
South Korea (Gaon)	17
South Korea (Kpop Hot 100)	10

== Accolades ==
Year	Award	Category	Result	Ref.
2018	Mnet Asian Music Awards	Song of the Year	Nominated	

=== Music program awards ===
Program	Date	Ref.
The Show (SBS MTV)	January 23, 2018	
Show Champion (MBC Music)	January 24, 2018	
