= Loveline (disambiguation) =

Loveline is an American radio call-in show which has run from 1983 to the present.

Loveline may also refer to:

- Loveline (TV series), a 1996-2000 MTV series based on the radio show
- Loveline (Eddie Rabbitt album), 1979
- Loveline (Tavares album), 1981
- Loveline Obiji (born 1990), a Nigerian powerlifter

== See also ==
- Lovelines, a 1989 album by the Carpenters
- Love Lines, a 2023 album by LP
- Lovelines (film), a 1984 American comedy directed by Rod Amateau
- "Lovelines" (Dawson's Creek), a 2003 television episode
- "Love Line" (NiziU song), 2025 song
