= Heartris =

Single by NiziU

from the EP Press Play
- Language: Korean
- Released: October 30, 2023
- Length: 3:01
- Label: JYP
- Composers: chAN's; Deepy (Take A Chance); Tea Belle; Boran; Ji Suyeon
- Lyricists: Park Jin-young; Lil June; Jeong Na-kyung

NiziU singles chronology
"Coconut" (2023)	"Heartris" (2023)	"Memories" (2024)

Music video
- "Heartris" on YouTube

"Heartris" is a song recorded by Japanese girl group NiziU for their first single album Press Play. It was released as the single album’s lead single by JYP Entertainment on October 30, 2023.

== Background and release ==
On October 2, 2023 JYP Entertainment announced that NiziU would make their Korean debut three years after their Japanese debut "Step and a Step" in 2020. On October 30, 2023, both "Heartris" and their first single album Press Play were released.

== Composition ==
"Heartris" Is written by JYP Entertainment founder Park Jin-young, Lil June, Jeong Na-Kyung and composed by chAN's, Deepy (Take A Chance), Tea Belle, Boran and Ji Suyeon. The song is composed in the key G minor and has 124 beats per minute and a running time of 3 minutes and 01 seconds. The song combines the English words 'Heart' and 'Tetris' to compare 'The way you and I meet creates perfect synergy' to the block game Tetris.

== Music video ==
The music video was directed by Lee Hye-su and Hong Jae-hwan of Swisher Film and was released alongside the song by JYP Entertainment on October 30. Label mate Felix from Stray Kids appeared as the male love interest in the video.

== Promotion ==
NiziU subsequently performed on three music programs: KBS's Music Bank on November 3, MBCs Show! Music Core on November 4 and SBS's Inkigayo on November 5.

== Accolades ==
Music program awards
Program	Date	Ref.
Show Champion	November 8, 2023	

== Charts ==
Chart (2023)	Peak position
Japan (Japan Hot 100)	10
South Korea (Circle Download)	94

== Certifications ==
Certifications for "Heartris"
Region	Certification	Certified units/sales
Japan (RIAJ)	Gold	50,000,000^{†}
^{†} Streaming-only figures based on certification alone.

== Release history ==
Release history for "Heartris"
Region	Date	Format	Label
Various	October 30, 2023	Digital download; streaming	JYP
