= Paradise (NiziU song) =

- Digital and regular edition cover

Single by NiziU

from the album Coconut
- Language: Japanese
- Released: March 3, 2023
- Length: 3:29
- Label: Epic Japan
- Composers: Bang Chan (3Racha); Changbin (3Racha); Han (3Racha); Versachoi
- Lyricists: Akira; Bang Chan (3Racha); Changbin (3Racha); Han (3Racha)

NiziU singles chronology
"Blue Moon" (2022)	"Paradise" (2023)	"Coconut" (2023)

Music video
- "Paradise" on YouTube

"Paradise" is a song recorded by Japanese girl group NiziU for their second studio album Coconut. It was released by Epic Records Japan on March 3, 2023.

== Background and release ==
On December 18, 2022, on the last concert of NiziU's Burn it Up tour it was announced that the group's upcoming single "Paradise" had been selected as the theme song for the movie Doraemon: Nobita's Sky Utopia, which was released in Japan in March 2023.

== Composition ==
"Paradise" was written and composed by 3Racha, a production trio of the boy group Stray Kids, which includes members Bang Chan, Changbin and Han. Lyrics were also written by Akira and composing was done by Versachoi. Running for 3 minutes and 27 seconds, the song is composed in the key of C-sharp major with a tempo of 170 beats per minute.

== Promotion ==
On March 4, 2023, NiziU performed "Paradise" on both Music Fair and NHK's music program Venue101. They also performed the song on TBS's Count Down TV on March 6 and on TV Asahi's Music Station on March 10.

== Awards and nominations ==
Awards and nominations
Year	Organization	Award	Result	Ref.
2023	MTV Video Music Awards Japan	Best Pop Video	Won	

== Charts ==
=== Weekly charts ===
Chart performance for "Paradise"
Chart (2023)	Peak position
Japan (Japan Hot 100)	1
Japan (JPN Cmb.)	2
Japan (Oricon)	2

== Certifications ==
Certifications for "Paradise"
Region	Certification	Certified units/sales
Japan (RIAJ)	Gold	100,000^{^}
Streaming
Japan (RIAJ)	Gold	50,000,000^{†}
^{^} Shipments figures based on certification alone.^{†} Streaming-only figures based on certification alone.
