= Nina Makino =

American singer and actress (born 2005)

- 牧野 仁菜
- Makino at KCON Japan 2026
- Born: Nina Makino-Hillman; February 27, 2005 (age 21); Seattle, Washington, United States
- Other names: Nina Hillman; Nina
- Occupations: Singer; actress
- Years active: 2015–present
- Musical career
- Genres: J-pop; K-pop
- Instrument: Vocals
- Years active: 2020–present
- Labels: JYP; Sony Music
- Member of: NiziU; JYP Nation

Nina Makino-Hillman (born February 27, 2005), also known professionally as Nina Makino (牧野 仁菜, Makino Nina), Nina Hillman (ヒルマン・ニナ, Hiruman Nina), and mononymously as Nina (ニナ), is an American singer and former child actress based in Japan. She is a member of the Japanese girl group NiziU.

Makino began her career as a child actress, appearing in several acting and campaign projects. After passing the first Amuse Multilingual Artists Audition held by Amuse Inc., Makino relocated to Japan and appeared in the film Blood Friends (2019). She left the company to participate in JYP Entertainment's survival reality program Nizi Project, where she, after finishing in ninth place, became a member of NiziU.

== Early life ==
Nina Makino-Hillman was born on February 27, 2005, in Seattle, Washington, United States. She was born to Rie Hillman, a Japanese mother, and Luke Hillman, an American father, who own Great Rice, a Seattle-based company importing Japanese rice to the United States. She has an older sister. After moving to Japan in 2017, Makino lived in Nagoya. Makino is fluent in English, and Japanese.

== Career ==
=== Pre-debut ===
While at ACT (A Contemporary Theatre), Makino starred as Trixie in Cat on a Hot Tin Roof (2015). Makino was the understudy for the musical theatre performance The Secret Garden for the role of Mary Lennox. She portrayed the young Beatrice Chance in the Book-It Repertory Theatre's production of The Brothers K, Part One: Strike Zone. Makino was also a featured actress in the online video campaign "How Girls Will Change the World", which promoted STEM education for girls. Her first acting role outside of theater was the American web series Divine Shadow (2016), an independent production filmed in Burien, Washington.

=== 2017–2019: Early Japanese projects ===
In 2017, Makino was one of six female finalists out of 4,000 applicants who passed the first Amuse Multilingual Artists Audition held by Amuse Inc. She signed with the company and moved to Japan. Her audition was partially broadcast on the television program Why Did You Come to Japan? in a segment focusing on the audition finals. Makino was cast in Mamoru Oshii's film Blood Friends, which was filmed in 2018. In 2019, she became a regular on NHK Educational TV show Suiensā as a member of the Suiensā Girls.

=== 2020–present: Nizi Project and NiziU ===
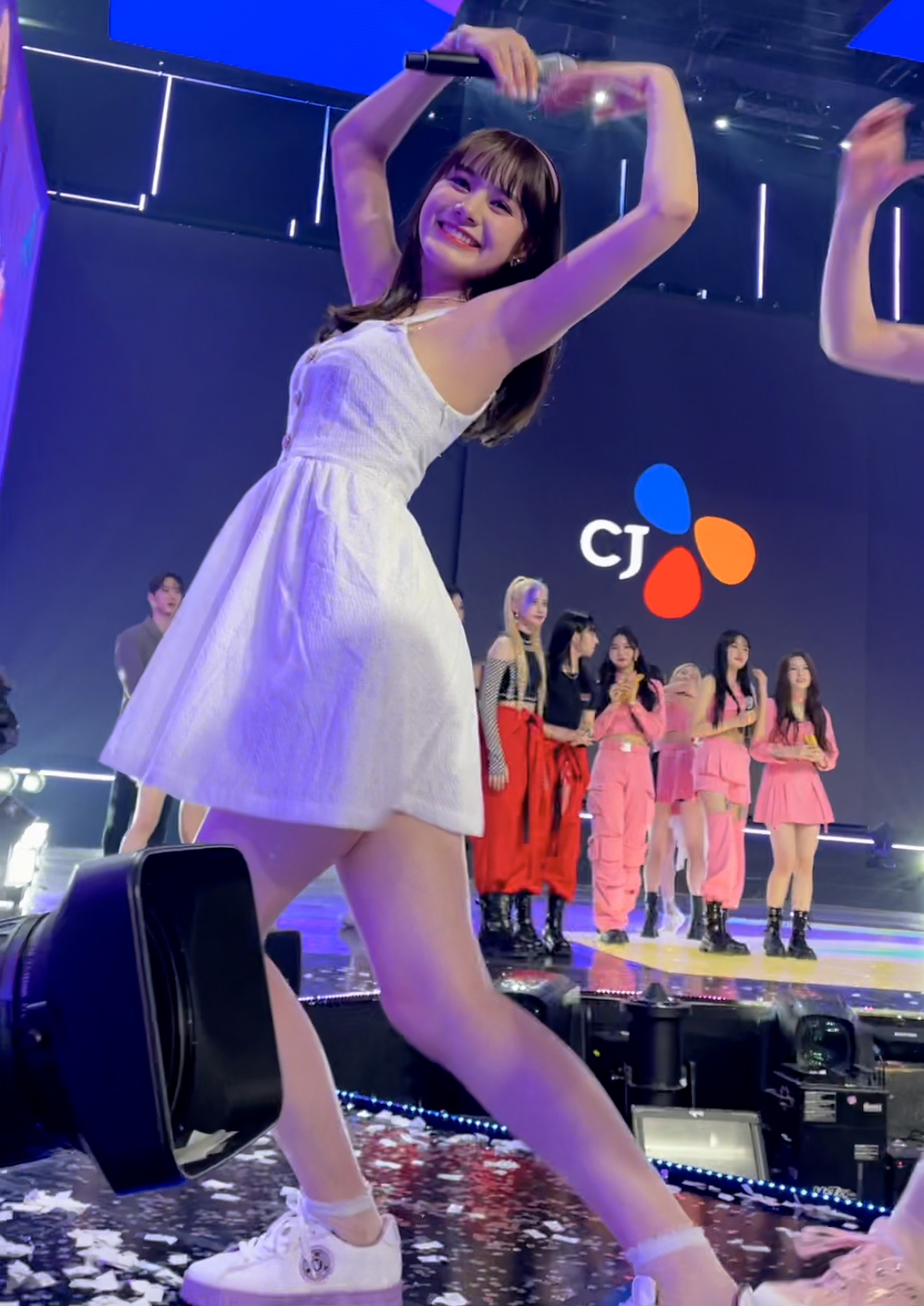
Makino at KCON 2022 in Seoul, South Korea, on May 8, 2022

In 2019, Makino left Amuse to audition for JYP Entertainment's reality survival program Nizi Project (2020) under the name Nina Hillman, where she competed to secure a spot in the label's next girl group. Out of 10,231 applicants, Makino came in ninth place, and she went on to join the new girl group, which was later named NiziU. The group debuted on December 2, 2020, with their lead single, "Step and a Step". With the public release of Blood Friends in 2022 after years of postponement, several Japanese media outlets have discussed that media promotions for the film were not allowed to mention that Makino is a member of NiziU due to troubles negotiating with JYP Entertainment, who had distanced her from her previous acting career.

== Filmography ==
=== Film ===
Year	Title	Role	Notes	Ref.
2019	Blood Friends	Mai	Supporting role (Note: Credited as Nina Makino.)	

=== Web series ===
Year	Title	Role	Network	Notes	Ref.
2016	Divine Shadow	Mieu Everest	4 Spot Television	Supporting role	

=== Television ===
Year	Title	Role	Network	Notes	Ref.
2019	Suiensā	Herself	NHK E-TV	Variety show regular; as part of Suiensā Girls	
2020	Nizi Project	Herself (Note: Credited as Nina Hillman.)	Hulu Japan, Nippon TV	Reality competition show; finished in 9th place	
