= Secret Garden (Oh My Girl EP) =

EP by Oh My Girl
- Released: January 9, 2018
- Recorded: 2017–2018
- Genres: K-pop; Dance
- Length: 18:18
- Language: Korean
- Label: WM Entertainment
- Producers: Lee Won-min; 72; Moon Jeong-gyu

Oh My Girl chronology
Coloring Book (2017)	Secret Garden (2018)	Remember Me (2018)

Singles from Secret Garden
- 1. "Secret Garden" Released: January 9, 2018

Secret Garden (Korean: 비밀정원; RR: Bimiljeongwon) is the fifth extended play (EP) by South Korean girl group Oh My Girl. It was released by WM Entertainment on January 9, 2018 and distributed by LOEN Entertainment. The album contains five songs, including the single "Secret Garden".

== Background ==
On October 30, 2017, WM Entertainment confirmed that due to continued health issues, it was decided that JinE's contract would be terminated so she would officially depart from the group. The following day, Oh My Girl's agency confirmed that a new mini album was planned for a November release. In November, it was announced that the released would be delayed to January for "a goal of a more complete album". On December 23, 2017, WM Entertainment announced Oh My Girl's comeback for January 9, with their fifth EP entitled Secret Garden.

== Track listing ==
No.	Title	Lyrics	Music	Arrangement	Length
1.	"Secret Garden" (비밀정원; Bimiljeongwon)	Seo Ji-eum	Steven Lee; Mayu Wakisaka; Sean Alexander	Steven Lee	4:04
2.	"Love O'clock"	Seo Ji-eum; Mimi	Andreas Öberg; Maria Marcus	Maria Marcus	3:56
3.	"Butterfly"	Junebug; Mimi	Darren Smith; Andreas Öberg; Bo Riley; Sean Alexander	Darren "Baby Dee Beats" Smith; Andreas Öberg; Avenue 52	3:53
4.	"Sixteen"	Seo Ji-eum	David Anthony; Sophie White; Samuel Cramer; Phoebe Jo Brown	David Anthony; Samuel Cramer	3:21
5.	"Magic"	MaFly; ZNEE; Mimi	Andreas Öberg; Skylar Mones; Tiaan Williams	Skylar Mones; Andreas Öberg	3:04
Total length:					18:21

== Charts ==
=== Weekly ===
Chart (2018)	Peak position
South Korean Albums (Gaon)	4
US World Albums (Billboard)	12
