= Mayu Wakisaka =

- Born: October 7, 1980 (age 46)
- Origin: Osaka, Japan
- Genre: Pop
- Occupation: Singer-songwriter
- Instruments: Piano
- Label: Sony Music Publishing Japan
- Website: mayuwakisaka.com

Mayu Wakisaka (脇阪 真由, Wakisaka Mayu; born October 7, 1980) is a singer-songwriter, composer, and lyricist based in Tokyo, Japan. Wakisaka grew up in Osaka, Japan, and studied law at Kyoto University. In 2007, she quit law school to pursue her career as a singer-songwriter and moved to Los Angeles.

While studying music at LA Music Academy, Wakisaka self-produced her first EP Stars Won't Fall, from which "24 Hours" got featured in Sony Walkman as a preload song, attracting an international fanbase.

In 2011, she recorded her second EP Into the Wild with an L.A. based producer, John Avila. An acoustic tune "Once" won the first prize in International Acoustic Music Award Open Category and made it to the final of Great American Songwriting Contest. Also, the piano ballad "What I See in Love" made it to the final of UK Songwriting Contest and Australian Songwriting Contest. Later, this song was featured as a sub theme song in In the Name of Love, a TV drama aired in Singapore and Malaysia.

In 2014, she released Halfway to You, a compilation album of her first EP as her first full-length album. In promotion of the album, she performed at SXSW as part of the Japan Nite tour in the United States and at The Great Escape Festival in UK. She also released her CD and performed in Korea and Singapore too.

In 2015, she co-wrote "Love Song" for the Korean female group, Miss A's EP, Colors, and "Like a Fool" for the Korean female group, Twice's debut EP, The Story Begins.

In 2017, she co-wrote "Real World" for Oh My Girl's fourth EP, Coloring Book, and in 2018, she co-wrote the song "Secret Garden" for their fifth EP of the same name. She is also credited as co-producer in TXT's debut song "Crown", for their EP The Dream Chapter in 2019.

In 2020, Wakisaka was credited as a co-writer for GFriend's song "Crème Brûlée" from the EP Song of the Sirens, as well as the songs "Three of Cups" and "Wheel of the Year" from their album Walpurgis Night.

In 2025, she wrote and co-produced the song "Liar Liar" from @onefive's first EP More Than Kawaii, as well as "Alps Vibes" from their second EP Doh Yoh.

In 2026, she wrote and co-produced "M1X5R" for @onefive's Sakuraization.

== Discography ==
=== Albums ===
==== As lead artist ====
List of studio albums, showing selected details
Title	Details
Halfway to You	Released: April 16, 2014; Label: Leeway Music & Media, INC.; Formats: CD, digital download, streaming

=== As producer / songwriter ===
List of songs co-written for other artists
Year	Artist	Song	Album
2015	Miss A	"Love Song"	Colors
2015	Twice	"Like A Fool"	The Story Begins
2015	Cyndi Wang	"Dare Not to Want?"	Cyndi Wants or Not?
2016	Apink	"Drummer Boy"	Pink Revolution
2016	Eri Sasaki	"Where Are You Now?"	Recalling/Last Diary
2017	Twice	"Knock Knock"	Twicecoaster: Lane 2
2017	Got7	"Face"	7 for 7
2017	Oh My Girl	"Real World"	Coloring Book
2017	JJ Project	"Tomorrow, Today"	Verse 2
2017	Girls' Generation	"Love Is Bitter"	Holiday Night
2018	Twice	"Candy Pop"	BDZ
2018	Twice	"Say It Again"	BDZ
2018	Twice	"Shot Thru The Heart"	Summer Nights
2018	Riri	"Be Alright"	Riri
2018	Oh My Girl	"Secret Garden"	Secret Garden
2018	Oh My Girl	"Illusion"	Remember Me
2018	Apink	"Promise Me"	One & Six
2018	Fromis 9	"Love Bomb"	From.9
2018	DreamNote	"Like You"	Dreamlike
2018	Haruka Tojo	"Trust Me"	Infant
2018	Got7	"Take Me To You"	Present: You
2019	Mamamoo	"4x4ever"	Reality in Black
2019	JBJ95	"Milky Way"	Awake
2019	Twice	"What You Waiting For"	&Twice
2019	Twice	"Likey (Japanese ver)"	#Twice2
2019	Tomorrow X Together	"Crown"	The Dream Chapter: Star
2019	Oh My Girl	"Gravity"	The Fifth Season
2019	Oh My Girl	"Crime Scene"	The Fifth Season
2019	Oh My Girl	"Tropical Love"	Fall in Love
2019	Loona	"Hi High"	[+ +]
2020	GFriend	"Crème Brûlée"	Song of the Sirens
2020	GFriend	"Three of Cups"	Walpurgis Night.
2020	GFriend	"Wheel of the Year"	Walpurgis Night.
2020	Little Glee Monster	"Symphony"	Bright New World
2020	Oh My Girl	"Flower Tea"	Nonstop
2020	Nature	"I'm So Pretty (Japanese Version)"	I'm So Pretty (Japanese Version)
2020	April	"Now Or Never"	Hello Summer
2020	King & Prince	"Break Away"	L&
2020	Ryu Su-jeong	"Tiger Eyes"	Tiger Eyes
2020	YooA	"End Of Story"	Bon Voyage
2020	JBJ95	"Seoulite"	Jasmin
2021	The Gospellers	"Loving Out Loud"	A Cappella 2
2021	Sakurako Ohara	"Long Distance"	L
2021	Twice	"Good At Love"	Perfect World
2021	Twice	"Four-Leaf Clover"	Perfect World
2021	NiziU	"Take a Picture"	U
2021	NiziU	"Twinkle Twinkle"	U
2021	Fantastics from Exile Tribe	"Winding Road"	Fantastic Voyage
2021	2PM	"With Me Again"	With Me Again
2021	Mai Kuraki	"Unbreakable"	Unconditional Love
2021	Mai Kuraki	"One Love"	Unconditional Love
2021	Aaron Yan	"I’ll be on Mars"	Vacation
2022	SixTones	"Fast Lane"	City
2022	SixTones	"Odds"	City
2022	SixTones	"Louder"	City
2022	SixTones	"Cassette Tape"	City
2022	SixTones	"Sepia"	Watashi
2022	SixTones	"Sing Along"	(Good Luck!)
2022	Rocket Punch	"Red Balloon"	Yellow Punch
2022	Twice	"Tick Tock"	Celebrate
2022	NiziU	"Blue Moon"	Blue Moon
2022	NiziU	"Already Special"	Blue Moon
2022	NiziU	"Asobo"	Coconut
2022	Itzy	"Voltage"	Ringo
2022	Billlie	"A Sign ~ Anonymous"	The Collective Soul and Unconscious: Chapter One
2022	Billlie	"My B = The Birth of Emotion"	The Billage of Perception: Chapter Two
2022	Craxy	"Requiem"	Who Am I
2022	Craxy	"Real"	Who Am I
2022	Ive	"Queen Of Hearts"	Eleven – Japanese ver.
2022	Yena	"Before Anyone Else"	Smiley
2022	Yena	"Lxxk 2 U"	Smiley
2022	Yena	"Vacay"	Smiley
2022	Yena	"WithOrWithOut"	Smartphone
2022	&Team	"Scent Of You"	First Howling: Me
2022	Elaiza	"Catch Up Santa"	Non-album single
2023	SixTones	"Boom-Pow-Wow!"	Koe
2023	Twice	"Catch A Wave"	Hare Hare
2023	Misamo	"Do Not Touch"	Masterpiece
2023	Now United	"Rodeo in Tokyo"	Non-album single
2023	NiziU	"Coconut"	Coconut
2023	NiziU	"Prism"	Coconut
2023	NiziU	"All Right"	Coconut
2023	NiziU	"Raindrops"	Coconut
2023	NiziU	"Love & Like"	Coconut
2023	El7z Up	"Cloud 9"	7+Up
2023	Itzy	"Cheshire (Japanese version)"	Ringo
2023	Itzy	"Trust Me (Midzy) (Japanese version)"	Ringo
2023	Viviz	"Spoiler"	My Lovely Liar OST Part 1
2023	Girls²	"Countdown"	We Are Girls² – II -
2023	Girls²	Doochi!?	Accelerate
2023	Girls²	"Rise & Shine"	Accelerate
2023	Girls²	"Rocky Steady"	We Are Girls² – II -
2023	Nexz	"Miracle"	Ride the Vibe (Japanese Ver.) / Keep on Moving
2024	Yena	"Good Morning"	Good Morning
2024	Yena	"DNA"	DNA
2024	Yena	"Smartphone – Japanese Ver"	DNA
2024	ONF	"Aphrodite"	Beautiful Shadow
2024	Tempest	"Bang!"	Bang!
2024	Tempest	"Lighthouse - Japanese Ver"	Bubble Gum
2024	Girls²	"Magic"	We Are Girls² – II -
2024	Twice	"Echoes of Heart"	Dive
2024	Oh My Girl	"Heavenly"	Dreamy Resonance
2024	Loossemble	"Cotton Candy"	TTYL
2024	Misamo	"Daydream"	Haute Couture
2024	Itzy	"Algorhythm"	Algorhythm
2024	BabyMonster	"Batter Up" – JP ver.	Non-album single
2024	Gen1es	"Lucky Bell"	Hourglass
2024	Billlie	"Dream Diary ~ (Etching Mémoires of Midnight Rêverie)"	Appendix: Of All We Have Lost
2024	Me:I	"Hi-Five"	Hi-Five
2024	NCT Wish	"Wishful Winter"	Wishful
2025	iScream	"Metamorphosis"	Non-album single
2025	Zerobaseone	"Now or Never"	Prezent
2025	Say My Name	"For My Dream"	My Name Is…
2025	@onefive	"Liar Liar"	More Than Kawaii
2025	@onefive	"Alps Vibes"	Doh Yoh
2025	Unis	"Spring Rain"	Swicy
2025	Me:I	"Million Stars"	Muse
2025	NiziU	"Yoake"	Awake
2025	NiziU	"Buddy Buddy"	Awake
2025	NiziU	"Love Emotion"	New Emotion
2025	NiziU	"Villain"	New Emotion
2025	NiziU	"Love Line – Japanese Ver"	New Emotion
2025	NiziU	"Happy Day"	New Emotion
2025	INI	"3D"	The Origin
2025	Twice	"Fine"	Enemy
2025	BoA	"It Takes Two"	Crazier
2025	Oh My Girl	"Weather Diary"	Weather Diary
2025	TripleS	"Heddofon (Headphones)"	SecretHimitsuBimil
2025	TripleS	"Oshare"	SecretHimitsuBimil
2025	Itzy	"Trigger"	Collector
2025	Kiss of Life	"Lucky"	Tokyo Mission Start
2025	Yena	"Star!" (featuring Hatsune Miku)	Non-album single
2026	Yena	"Nemonemo" (Japanese version)	Non-album single
2026	Cirra	"Close"	One Way Runway / Always
2026	Cirra	"All for Me"	One Way Runway / Always
2026	Me:I	"Best Match"	Non-album single
2026	Fromis_9	"Sky Runner"	Like You Better (Japanese Version)
2026	@onefive	"M1X5R"	Sakuraization
2026	TripleS	"Baby Flower" (Japanese version)	Non-album single
2026	Kana Nishino	"Power of Love"	Non-album single
2026	Idntt	"Kids Return" (Japanese version)	Non-album single
