= Nizi Project season 2 =

Nizi Project
- Season 2
- No. of episodes: 20

Release
- Original network: Hulu Japan
- Original release: July 21 – December 15, 2023

Season chronology
- ← Previous; Season 1

Nizi Project Season 2 (lit. "Rainbow Project Season 2") is a 2023 Japanese reality competition show, and is the second season of Nizi Project series. The series is a joint project between JYP Entertainment and Sony Music Entertainment Japan with the intention of creating a global Japanese boy group. Nizi Project Season 2 is centered on JYP Entertainment founder Park Jin-young selecting members for the boy group out of 20 boys, who eventually debuted as NEXZ.

== Background ==
On July 12, 2021, Park held a press conference announcing that Nizi Project will have a second season to create a Japanese boy band set for debut in March 2023. Applications for boys from 14 to 22 years old are open from July 2021 to October 2021. Auditions will take place from November to December 2021 in eight cities in Japan, as well as New York and Los Angeles in the United States, and Seoul in South Korea. The contestants will be evaluated in five categories: vocal, dance, rap, modeling, and composing/lyricism. The members for the group will be finalized and announced in December 2023.

== Contestants ==
Division	Contestant	Background
Tokyo	Eiji Ito (伊藤 瑛史)	
Tokyo	Ken So (蘇 建)	
Tokyo	Kohei Nagatsuka (永塚 康平)	
Tokyo	Miraku Hoshizawa (星沢 弥樂)	
Kobe	Yu Tomiyasu (富安 悠)	
Kobe	Reito Kitagawa (北川 玲叶)	
Kobe	Sean Matsubara (柗原 翔音)	
Kobe	Yuki Nishiyama (西山 裕貴)	
Kobe	Naoya Kida (紀田 直哉)	
Kobe	Shokei Wataru (渡 祥恵)	
Hiroshima	Takao Yamaguchi (山口 恭生)	
Hiroshima	Yuito Enomoto (榎本 唯人)	
Hiroshima	Takato Otsuka (大塚 天翔)	
Okinawa	Riki Irei (伊礼 吏輝)	
Sapporo	Rio Takahashi (高橋 理央)	
Seoul	Tomoya Uemura (植村 朋哉)	JYP Entertainment trainee; trained for 2 years and 7 months
Seoul	Taichi Inagaki (稲垣 太地)	JYP Entertainment trainee
Seoul	Sodai Miura (三浦 颯大)	JYP Entertainment trainee; trained for 1 year and 1 month
Seoul	Haru Inoue (井上 陽)	JYP Entertainment trainee; trained for 6 months
Seoul	Takuto Matsuda (松田拓翔)	JYP Entertainment trainee
Seoul	Seita Kawashima (河嶋 星太)	JYP Entertainment trainee; trained for 7 months
Seoul	Taiga Fujimaki (藤牧 大雅)	JYP Entertainment trainee
Seoul	Yuhi Komori (小森 優陽)	JYP Entertainment trainee; trained for 3 years

== Rankings ==
=== Summary ===
Color key

Cube was awarded
Cube was awarded as a runner-up
Cube was awarded later in the end of Part 1
Ranked last; at risk of elimination
Eliminated or withdrawn

Region	Contestant	Part 1					Part 2			
Region	Contestant	Dance	Vocals	X factor	Personality	Part 1 Ranking	Growth (eps. 11-13)	Teamwork (eps. 14-15)	Image (eps. 17-18)	Finals (eps. 19-20)
Seoul	Tomoya Uemura	6	2	Won	2	1	2	2	2	1
Kobe	Yuki Nishiyama	12	3	Won	Won	2	6	7	8	3
Seoul	Haru Inoue	4	5	Won	Won	3	5	1	1	2
Seoul	Yuhi Komori	7	7	Won	Won	6	4	3	3	6
Kobe	Yu Tomiyasu	10	11	Won	Won	8	1	4	5	5
Seoul	Seita Kawashima	17	6	Won	Won	11	9	6	4	7
Tokyo	Ken So	18	17	Won	Won	12	3	5	6	4
Tokyo	Eiji Ito	1	9	Won	Won	4	7	8	7	Eliminated
Tokyo	Miraku Hoshizawa	5	10	Won	1	5	12	10	9	Eliminated
Seoul	Taiga Fujimaki	13	14	Won	Won	7	11	11	Eliminated	
Kobe	Sean Matsubara	3	16	1	Won	9	8	12	Eliminated	
Seoul	Sodai Miura	9	1	Won	Won	10	10	9	Eliminated	
Sapporo	Rio Takahashi	14	4	—N/a	—N/a	Eliminated				
Kobe	Shokei Wataru	8	8	—N/a	—N/a	Eliminated				
Hiroshima	Takato Otsuka	20	20	Won	—N/a	Eliminated				
Seoul	Taichi Inagaki	15	12	Won	—N/a	Eliminated				
Tokyo	Taichi Takahashi	11	15	Won	—N/a	Eliminated				
Hiroshima	Takao Yamaguchi	19	18	—N/a	—N/a	Eliminated				
Hiroshima	Yuito Enomoto	16	19	Won	—N/a	Eliminated				
Tokyo	Kohei Nagatsuka	2	13	—N/a	—N/a	Eliminated				
Kobe	Reito Kitagawa	Eliminated								
Kobe	Naoya Kida	Eliminated								
Okinawa	Riki Irei	Eliminated								
Seoul	Takuto Matsuda	Eliminated								

== Aftermath ==
- The top 7 finalists debuted as Nexz.
- Some trainees joined other companies:
  - Taichi Takahashi joined BMSG as a trainee.
  - Sodai Miura, Eiji Ito, and Yuito Enomoto joined Sony Music Japan's trainee team, M:Rea1.
  - Taichi Inagaki joined Bill Entertainment as trainee.
  - Taiga Fujimaki joined IX Entertainment as trainee.
- Some trainees debuted in other groups:
  - Naoya Kida debuted in MAZZEL, a boy group under BMSG.
- Some trainees participated in other survival shows:
  - Miraku Hoshizawa participated in KBS2 reality competition program, Make Mate 1.
    - He placed 3rd and thus made the final line up of Nouera.
  - Yuito Enomoto participated in the SBS survival show Universe League.
    - He was eliminated in the finale after ranking 18th.
  - Taichi Inagaki and Taiga Fujimaki participated in the Mnet survival show Boys II Planet
    - Taichi was eliminated in the second episode after ranking 95th.
    - Taiga was eliminated in the fifth episode after ranking 65th.
  - Taiga Fujimaki is currently participating in Produce 101 Japan: Shinsekai.
