= Clap Clap (NiziU song) =

- Digital and regular edition cover

Single by NiziU

from the album Coconut
- Language: Japanese
- B-side: "Short Trip"
- Released: July 20, 2022
- Length: 2:44
- Label: Epic Japan
- Composers: Trippy; Charlotte Wilson (The Hub); Frankie Day (The Hub); The Hub 88
- Lyricists: Kentz; Trippy

NiziU singles chronology
"Asobo" (2022)	"Clap Clap" (2022)	"Blue Moon" (2022)

Music video
- "Clap Clap" on YouTube

"Clap Clap" is a song recorded by Japanese girl group NiziU. It is the group's third maxi single, featuring three other tracks. It was released by Epic Records Japan on July 20, 2022, as the second single from their second studio album Coconut.

== Composition ==
The release contains four tracks, including the title song "Clap Clap" and the B-side "Short Trip" with the instrumental versions of the songs. "Clap Clap" is described as a song that boasts a strong addictiveness by adding applause and brass sound to the funky bass line, and it is expected that you will be able to meet a different side of NiziU members. "Clap Clap" was composed in the key of A Major with a tempo of 176 beats per minute.

== Promotion ==
To promote "Clap Clap", NiziU performed the song on the Japanese television show Music Station on August 5, 2022 and September 9, 2022, and on Music Fair on August 20, 2022.

== Commercial performance ==
The CD single debuted at number 1 on the daily ranking of the Oricon Singles Chart with 106,621 units sold on its release day. It also peaked at number 1 on the Billboard Japan Hot 100.

== Music video ==
The music video shows a powerful performance with a gorgeous graffiti background and cool visuals of the members. It was directed by Naive Creative Production.

== Charts ==
Chart performance for "Clap Clap"
Chart (2022)	Peak position
Japan (Japan Hot 100)	1
Japan (JPN Cmb.)	1
Japan (Oricon)	1

== Awards and nominations ==
Awards and nominations
Year	Organization	Award	Result	Ref.
2022	Japan Record Awards	Excellent Work Award	Won	

== Certifications ==
Certifications for "Clap Clap"
Region	Certification	Certified units/sales
Japan (RIAJ)	Platinum	250,000^{^}
^{^} Shipments figures based on certification alone.
