= Remember Me (Oh My Girl EP) =

- Digital and Pink version cover

EP by Oh My Girl
- Released: September 10, 2018
- Studio: Various: 821 Sound Mastering; Doobdoob Studio; Iconic Sounds; MonoTree Studio; Seoul Studio; W Sound (Seoul); NK Studio (Los Angeles)
- Genre: K-pop; Dance; Ballad
- Length: 18:02
- Language: Korean
- Label: WM Entertainment
- Producer: Lee Won-min (exec.); Moon Jeong-gyu (exec.); Choo Dae-kwan (MonoTree); Command Freaks; David Amber; MRey; Steven Lee

Oh My Girl chronology
Secret Garden (2018)	Remember Me (2018)	Oh My Girl Japan Debut Album (2019)

Singles from Remember Me
- 1. "Remember Me" Released: September 10, 2018; 2. "Twilight (Queendom Ver.)" Released: October 25, 2019

Remember Me (stylized in all caps) is the sixth extended play (EP) by South Korean girl group Oh My Girl. It was released by WM Entertainment on September 10, 2018 and distributed by Kakao M. The album contains five songs, including the single "Remember Me".

== Release and promotion ==
On August 21, 2018, Oh My Girl's agency WM Entertainment revealed that the group had recently completed music video shooting for a comeback planned the following month. A showcase was held in the evening of September 10 to commemorate the release of the new record. Remember Me is the group's sixth extended play, released in "Pink" and "Violet" versions. The day after the album's official release, Oh My Girl had their comeback stage for Remember Me on the music program The Show, performing the single "Remember Me" on television. They won their second music show award from the same program on September 18.

== Commercial performance ==
The album debuted at number three on South Korea's Weekly Gaon Album Chart and at number eight on the Monthly Gaon Album Chart, selling 21,911 by the end of September. The title track also peaked at number 36 on the Gaon Digital Chart and at number 4 on the Gaon Download Chart.

== Track listing ==
No.	Title	Lyrics	Music	Arrangement	Length
1.	"Remember Me" (불꽃놀이)	Seo Ji-eum; Mimi	Steven Lee; Caroline Gustavsson	Steven Lee	3:15
2.	"Echo" (메아리)	Seo Ji-eum; Mimi	Hyuk Shin; MRey; Courtney Woolsey	MRey	3:33
3.	"Twilight"	Seo Ji-eum; Mimi	Command Freaks; Onestar (MonoTree); Krysta Youngs	Command Freaks	3:33
4.	"Illusion"	Seo Ji-eum	David Amber; Mayu Wakisaka	David Amber	3:44
5.	"Our Story" (우리 이야기)	Choo Dae-kwan (MonoTree); Son Ko-eun (MonoTree)	Choo Dae-kwan (MonoTree)	Choo Dae-kwan (MonoTree)	3:57
Total length:					18:02

== Charts ==
Chart (2018)	Peak position
South Korean Albums (Gaon)	3
US World Albums (Billboard)	13
