= Nizi Project season 1 =

Nizi Project
- Season 1
- Nizi Project logo
- No. of episodes: 20

Release
- Original network: Hulu Japan
- Original release: January 31 – June 26, 2020

Season chronology
- Next → Season 2

Nizi Project (lit. "Rainbow Project") is a 2020 Japanese reality competition show. The series is a joint project between JYP Entertainment and Sony Music Entertainment Japan with the intention of creating a Japanese girl group aimed at a global audience. Nizi Project is centered on JYP Entertainment founder Park Jin-young selecting members for the girl group out of 26 girls, who eventually debuted as NiziU.

Part 1 focused on the boot camp in 2019 with 26 contestants and was broadcast exclusively on Hulu Japan from January 31, 2020, to March 27, 2020. Part 2, which focused on the finals in 2020 between the top 14 contestants, was broadcast from May 22, 2020, to June 26, 2020. Beginning with Part 2, the series was also broadcast on YouTube.

A version of the show hosted by Daimaou Kosaka was broadcast on NTV from April 17, 2020, to June 26, 2020, under the title Nizi no Kake Hashi (虹のかけ橋) and featured interviews with Park and the contestants of Nizi Project. An abridged version was serialized on the variety show Sukkiri with live commentary from the show's panelists.

In July 2021, Park announced that Nizi Project would have a second season to create a 9-member Japanese boy band. The project was later delayed, but it resumed in July 2023.

== Background ==
In February 2019, JYP Entertainment and Sony Music Entertainment Japan announced that they were creating an audition program titled Nizi Project to create a Japanese girl group aimed at a global audience, with plans for the group to debut in November 2020. Auditions for Japanese girls aged 15–22 years old opened on May 1, 2019, and were evaluated by a panel of judges. (Note: Contestants who are 14 years old are allowed to apply as long as they are turning 15 years old by the end of 2019 and graduating from middle school by March 2019.) Approximately 10,231 people auditioned for the show. The second round of auditions took place from July to August 2019 in eight locations in Japan as well as Hawaii and Los Angeles, with 26 contestants selected by JYP Entertainment founder Park Jin-young. The 26 contestants attended a boot camp in Tokyo in September 2019 for four nights and five days. The top 14 contestants were sent to train in South Korea for six months in December 2019.

Each contestant selected by Park would be given a cube pendant based on the Nizi Project logo. Throughout the show, Park would evaluate each contestant in four different categories, with a triangular cube awarded to a contestant to fill her pendant if he felt she satisfied the category. A second set of cubes was introduced in Part 2, with four additional tests.

Part 1 was broadcast from January 31, 2020, to March 27, 2020, on Hulu Japan. Part 2 was broadcast from May 22, 2020, to June 26, 2020. In addition to Hulu Japan, the series was also uploaded to YouTube and an abridged version of the show was serialized through NTV's variety show Sukkiri, with live commentaries from the show's panelists. A version of the show, presented in the "perspective of the [host] and [Park] as the producers", was broadcast as a series of documentaries under the title Nizi no Kake Hashi (虹のかけ橋); the show was hosted by Daimaou Kosaka, with interviews from Park and the Nizi Project contestants, and was broadcast from April 17, 2020, to June 26, 2020. Prior to the finale of Part 2, Sukkiri ran a 25-minute feature of all the episodes from June 15 to June 26, 2020, on weekdays. A special feature of Nizi no Kake Hashi was broadcast on June 26, 2020, with announcer Keisuke Mori co-hosting the segment with Kosaka.

== Contestants ==
Region	Contestant	Age	Background
Nagoya	Erina Hanada (花田 恵理奈)	—N/a	—N/a
Nagoya	Rio Hanabashi (花橋 梨緒)	17 (Note: Age in Part 1.)–18 (Note: Age in Part 2.)	Former EXPG trainee with Bunnies and Kizzy
Nagoya	Miu Sakurai (櫻井 美羽)	17	—N/a
Sendai	Nina Hillman (ヒルマン・ニナ)	14–15	Child actress and television personality under the name Nina Makino (牧野 仁菜)
Sendai	Kako Oguri (小栗 かこ)	—N/a	Former member of GEM and One Chance
Osaka	Ayane Marutani (丸谷 彩音)	15	—N/a
Osaka	Ririka Kishida (岸田 莉里花)	17	—N/a
Osaka	Riku Oe (大江 梨久)	17	—N/a
Osaka	Mayuka Ogou (小合 麻由佳)	15–16	—N/a
Tokyo	Akari Inoue (井上 あかり)	14–15	—N/a
Tokyo	Miihi Suzuno (鈴野 未光)	14–15	JYP Entertainment trainee; trained for 7 months
Tokyo	Rima Yokoi (横井 里茉)	15–16	JYP Entertainment trainee; trained for 7 months
Tokyo	Mako Yamaguchi (山口 真子)	18–19	JYP Entertainment trainee; trained for 2 years and 7 months
Tokyo	Hina Tanigawa (谷川 陽菜)	—N/a	Former member of TPD Dash!
Tokyo	Maya Katsumura (勝村 摩耶)	17–18	Former YG Japan trainee
Tokyo	Yuna (ユナ)	15–16	JYP Entertainment trainee; trained for 2 years and 8 months
Tokyo	Ayaka Arai (新井 彩花)	16	—N/a
Tokyo	Kyoka Taniya (谷屋 杏香)	—N/a	—N/a
Tokyo	Funa Takaya (高谷 楓菜)	—N/a	—N/a
Tokyo	Rei Ito (伊藤玲)	—N/a	—N/a
Sapporo	Suzu Ozaki (尾崎 すず)	18	—N/a
Fukuoka	Riria Ikematsu (池松 里梨愛)	16–17	Former member of α-X's
Fukuoka	Momoka Hirai (平井 桃伽)	15	—N/a
Okinawa	Moeno Yamashiro (山城 萌野)	—N/a	—N/a
Los Angeles	Mei Plunkett (プランケット明)	—N/a	—N/a
Los Angeles	Ana Sato (佐藤 愛夏)	—N/a	—N/a

== Rankings ==
=== Summary ===
The top 9 finalists debuted as NiziU.

Color key

Cube was awarded
Cube was awarded as a runner-up
Ranked last; at risk of elimination
Eliminated or withdrawn

Region	Contestant	Part 1				Part 2			
Region	Contestant	Dance (eps. 4-5)	Vocals (eps. 5-6)	Star (eps. 7-8)	Personality (eps. 9-10)	Growth (eps. 11-13)	Teamwork (eps. 14-15)	Image (eps. 17-18)	Finals (eps. 19-20)
Tokyo	Mako Yamaguchi	1	1	Won	1	2	3	1	1
Osaka	Riku Oe	6	4	Won	5	3	4	10	2
Tokyo	Rima Yokoi	7	7	Won	4	5	2	6	3
Nagoya	Rio Hanabashi	9	13	—N/a	10	6	8	2	4
Tokyo	Maya Katsumura	12	12	Won	3	4	1	5	5
Tokyo	Miihi Suzuno	2	3	Won	2	1	6	11	6
Osaka	Mayuka Ogou	21 (Note: Park Jin-young awarded some contestants with any of the first three cubes during the showcase in episodes 9 and 10.)	24	Won	13	8	11	3	7
Tokyo	Ayaka Arai	16	18	Won	14	9	7	12	8
Sendai	Nina Hillman	24	2	Won	7	7	9	8	9
Tokyo	Akari Inoue	10	9	Won	11	13	5	4	Eliminated
Tokyo	Yuna	8	8	Won	6	10	12	7	Eliminated
Fukuoka	Riria Ikematsu	3	6	—N/a	12	11	10	9	Eliminated
Fukuoka	Momoka Hirai	15	11	Won	9	12	13	13 (eliminated)	
Sapporo	Suzu Ozaki	5	5	Won	8	Withdrawn (Note: Suzu Ozaki withdrew after Part 1 for personal reasons.)			
Tokyo	Kyoka Taniya	18	19	Won	Eliminated				
Okinawa	Moeno Yamashiro	13	23	Won	Eliminated				
Nagoya	Miu Sakurai	17	10	—N/a	Eliminated				
Los Angeles	Mei Plunkett	14	14	—N/a	Eliminated				
Tokyo	Hina Tanigawa	22	15	—N/a	Eliminated				
Tokyo	Funa Takaya	19	16	—N/a	Eliminated				
Tokyo	Rei Ito	11	17	—N/a	Eliminated				
Sendai	Kako Oguri	20	20	—N/a	Eliminated				
Osaka	Ririka Kishida	4	21	—N/a	Eliminated				
Osaka	Ayane Marutani	23	22	—N/a	Eliminated				
Nagoya	Erina Hanada	25	26	—N/a	Eliminated				
Los Angeles	Ana Sato	26	25	—N/a	Withdrawn (Note: Ana Sato withdrew from Nizi Project shortly before the showcase evaluation in Part 1 due to a knee injury.)				

=== Part 1 ===
Nizi Project Part 1 focused on the auditions in July and August 2019 and the Tokyo boot camp in September 2019. Auditions opened on May 1, 2019, for girls aged 15–22 years old, with a total of 10,231 entries. The second round of auditions took place from July to August 2019 in Sapporo, Sendai, Tokyo, Nagoya, Osaka, Hiroshima, Fukuoka, and Okinawa, as well as Hawaii and Los Angeles in the United States. During the second auditions, Park and a panel of judges selected 26 contestants, which they awarded with Nizi pendants, and they would attend a boot camp in Tokyo that lasted four nights and five days.

During the boot camp, the contestants were evaluated under four categories: dance, vocals, star quality, and personality. If Park felt a contestant satisfied one of the categories, he would award her a triangular cube to fill her Nizi pendant.

==== Auditions ====
Broadcast order	Region	Contestant	Dance	Vocal
1	Nagoya	Erina Hanada	"Candy Pop" (Twice)	Not broadcast
2	Nagoya	Rio Hanabashi	"Hoshikuzu Venus" (Aimer)	Not broadcast
19	Nagoya	Miu Sakurai	Not broadcast	"Good-bye Baby" (Miss A)
3	Sendai	Nina Hillman	"What Is Love? (Japanese ver.)" (Twice)	"Brand New Day" (Rei Yasuda)
—N/a	Sendai	Kako Oguri	Not broadcast	Not broadcast
4	Osaka	Ririka Kishida	"Who's Your Mama?" (Park Jin-young feat. Jessi)	Not broadcast
5	Osaka	Ayane Marutani	"Who's Your Mama?" (Park Jin-young feat. Jessi)	Not broadcast
20	Osaka	Riku Oe	"Candy Pop" (Twice) (Note: Not released on official television broadcast.)	"Hoshikuzu Venus" (Aimer)
—N/a	Osaka	Mayuka Ogou	"Candy Pop" (Twice)	Not broadcast
6	Tokyo	Akari Inoue	"BDZ" (Twice)	"Brand New Day" (Rei Yasuda)
9	Tokyo	Miihi Suzuno	Not broadcast	"Precious" (Yuna Ito)
10	Tokyo	Rima Yokoi	"Bad Girl Good Girl" (Miss A)	"Irony" (Wonder Girls)
12	Tokyo	Mako Yamaguchi	"You're the One" (Park Jin-young)	"Freesia" (Uru)
8	Tokyo	Hina Tanigawa	"Bad Girl Good Girl" (Miss A)	Not broadcast
15	Tokyo	Maya Katsumura	"24 Hours" (Sunmi)	Not broadcast
16	Tokyo	Yuna	"Irony" (Wonder Girls)	Not broadcast
17	Tokyo	Ayaka Arai	"Bad Girl Good Girl" (Miss A)	Not broadcast
21	Tokyo	Kyoka Taniya	"What Is Love? (Japanese ver.)" (Twice)	Not broadcast
—N/a	Tokyo	Funa Takaya	Not broadcast	Not broadcast
—N/a	Tokyo	Rei Ito	Not broadcast	Not broadcast
7	Sapporo	Suzu Ozaki	"24 Hours" (Sunmi)	"BDZ" (Twice)
7	Fukuoka	Riria Ikematsu	"Candy Pop" (Twice)	"Yasashisa de Afureru You ni" (Juju)
18	Fukuoka	Momoka Hirai	"Good-bye Baby" (Miss A)	"Be My Baby (Japanese ver.)" (Wonder Girls)
11	Okinawa	Moeno Yamashiro	"Who's Your Mama?" (Park Jin-young feat. Jessi)	"Yasashisa de Afureru You ni" (Juju)
13	Los Angeles	Mei Plunkett	"Bad Girl Good Girl" (Miss A)	Not broadcast
14	Los Angeles	Ana Sato	"What Is Love?" (Twice)	Not broadcast

==== Cube 1: Dance ====
For the dance evaluation, yellow cubes were awarded to the top 3 contestants, with additional cubes awarded to the rest of the top 16 contestants.

Broadcast order	Contestant	Song	Rank	Result
1	Maya Katsumura	"Dalla Dalla" (Itzy)	12	Runner-up
2	Miihi Suzuno	"Cheer Up (Japanese ver.)" (Twice)	2	Won
3	Yuna	"Likey" (Twice)	8	Runner-up
4	Ayaka Arai	"Dalla Dalla" (Itzy)	16	Runner-up
5	Riria Ikematsu	"Dalla Dalla" (Itzy)	3	Won
6	Rio Hanabashi	"Summertime" (Riri, Keiju, Nariaki Obukuro)	9	Runner-up
7	Akari Inoue	"Dalla Dalla" (Itzy)	10	Runner-up
9	Mako Yamaguchi	"I'll Be Back (Japanese ver.)" (2PM)	1	Won
10	Ririka Kishida	"Cheer Up (Japanese ver.)" (Twice)	4	Runner-up
11	Nina Hillman	"Dalla Dalla" (Itzy)	24	—N/a
12	Rima Yokoi	"Fancy (Japanese ver.)" (Twice)	7	Runner-up
13	Riku Oe	"Fancy (Japanese ver.)" (Twice)	6	Runner-up
14	Moeno Yamashiro	"Yuki no Hana" (Mika Nakashima)	13	Runner-up
15	Momoka Hirai	"Fancy (Japanese ver.)" (Twice)	15	Runner-up
16	Funa Takaya	"Fancy (Japanese ver.)" (Twice)	19	—N/a
17	Mayuka Ogou	"Dalla Dalla" (Itzy)	21	—N/a
—N/a	Suzu Ozaki	Not broadcast	5	Runner-up
—N/a	Rei Ito	Not broadcast	11	Runner-up
—N/a	Mei Plunkett	Not broadcast	14	Runner-up
—N/a	Miu Sakurai	Not broadcast	17	—N/a
—N/a	Kyoka Taniya	Not broadcast	18	—N/a
—N/a	Kako Oguri	Not broadcast	20	—N/a
—N/a	Hina Tanigawa	Not broadcast	22	—N/a
—N/a	Ayane Marutani	Not broadcast	23	—N/a
—N/a	Erina Hanada	Not broadcast	25	—N/a
—N/a	Ana Sato	Not broadcast	26	—N/a

==== Cube 2: Vocal ====
For the vocal evaluation, green cubes were awarded to 7 contestants, with additional cubes awarded to the rest of the top 13 contestants.

Broadcast order	Contestant	Song	Rank	Result
1	Momoka Hirai	"Comeback When You Hear This Song (Japanese ver.)" (2PM)	11	Runner-up
2	Miu Sakurai	"Connect" (ClariS)	10	Won
3	Miihi Suzuno	"Yuki no Hana" (Mika Nakashima)	3	Won
4	Riku Oe	"Yuki no Hana" (Mika Nakashima)	4	Won
5	Rima Yokoi	"Dalla Dalla" (Itzy)	7	Runner-up
6	Maya Katsumura	"A (Japanese ver.)" (Got7)	12	Runner-up
7	Rio Hanabashi	"Yuki no Hana" (Mika Nakashima)	13	Runner-up
8	Ayaka Arai	"One More Time" (Twice)	18	—N/a
9	Mayuka Ogou	"Love Forever" (Miliyah Kato feat. Shota Shimizu)	24	—N/a
10	Ririka Kishida	"One More Time" (Twice)	21	Runner-up
11	Nina Hillman	"I'll Be Back (Japanese ver.)" (2PM)	2	Won
12	Yuna	"Likey (Japanese ver.)" (Twice)	8	Runner-up
13	Mako Yamaguchi	"Yuki no Hana" (Mika Nakashima)	1	Won
—N/a	Suzu Ozaki	Not broadcast	5	Won
—N/a	Riria Ikematsu	Not broadcast	6	Won
—N/a	Akari Inoue	Not broadcast	10	Runner-up
—N/a	Mei Plunkett	Not broadcast	14	—N/a
—N/a	Hina Tanigawa	Not broadcast	15	—N/a
—N/a	Funa Takaya	Not broadcast	16	—N/a
—N/a	Rei Ito	Not broadcast	17	—N/a
—N/a	Kyoka Taniya	Not broadcast	19	—N/a
—N/a	Kako Oguri	Not broadcast	20	—N/a
—N/a	Ayane Marutani	Not broadcast	22	—N/a
—N/a	Moeno Yamashiro	Not broadcast	23	—N/a
—N/a	Ana Sato	Not broadcast	25	—N/a
—N/a	Erina Hanada	Not broadcast	26	—N/a

==== Cube 3: Star ====
For the star quality evaluation, red cubes were awarded to 8 contestants, with additional cubes awarded to 4 others.

Broadcast order	Contestant	Act	Result
1	Erina Hanada	Cheer dance with "One More Time" (Twice)	—N/a
2	Ayaka Arai	Tennis lesson with "Cheer Up (Japanese ver.)" (Twice)	Won
3	Kyoka Taniya	Cooking tteokbokki with "Cheer Up (Japanese ver.)" (Twice)	Runner-up
4	Riku Oe	Karate with "Again & Again (Japanese ver.)" (2PM)	Won
5	Ayane Marutani	Lock dance	—N/a
6	Ririka Kishida	Ballet	—N/a
7	Momoka Hirai	Interview skit	—N/a
8	Mayuka Ogou	"Yuki no Hana" (Mika Nakashima) on ocarina	—N/a
9	Mei Plunkett	Magic card trick	—N/a
10	Riria Ikematsu	Modeling	—N/a
11	Rio Hanabashi	Dance	—N/a
12	Mako Yamaguchi	Eating a lemon without making a face and writing calligraphy	Runner-up
13	Maya Katsumura	Reading "The Ugly Duckling" with self-illustrated storyboards	Won
14	Rima Yokoi	"One More Time" (Twice) on drums	Won
15	Hina Tanigawa	Confessing with seven personalities	—N/a
16	Miihi Suzuno	Baton twirling with "TT (Japanese ver.)" (Twice)	Won
17	Miu Sakurai	Eating grapes with cream	—N/a
18	Suzu Ozaki	Imitating Sailor Moon	Won
19	Yuna	Dance	Won
20	Moeno Yamashiro	Dance	Runner-up
21	Rei Ito	Dance	—N/a
22	Ana Sato	Violin	—N/a
23	Funa Takaya	Dance	—N/a
24	Kako Oguri	Dance	—N/a
25	Nina Hillman	Radio show with "Cheer Up (Japanese ver.)" (Twice)	Won
26	Akari Inoue	Cheer dance with "Fancy (Japanese ver.)" (Twice)	Runner-up

==== Cube 4: Personality ====
The final performance of the Tokyo boot camp consisted of a group performance with the song assigned by Park. The showcase was evaluated by Park and Twice members Sana and Momo. Contestants had an opportunity to appeal and be awarded any of the first three cubes missed as they perform in the showcase in episodes 9 and 10.

Afterwards, the contestants were awarded blue cubes for personality based on feedback from the trainers, staff, and the answers that the contestants provided on their questionnaires. The contestants with 3 or more cubes were allowed to proceed to the boot camp in South Korea.

Order	Team	Contestant	Song	Rank	Result
1	Nizi Girls	Suzu Ozaki (leader)	"Be My Baby (Japanese ver.)" (Wonder Girls)	8	Safe
1	Nizi Girls	Rio Hanabashi	"Be My Baby (Japanese ver.)" (Wonder Girls)	10	Runner-up
1	Nizi Girls	Momoka Hirai	"Be My Baby (Japanese ver.)" (Wonder Girls)	9	Safe
1	Nizi Girls	Mei Plunkett	"Be My Baby (Japanese ver.)" (Wonder Girls)	Eliminated	
1	Nizi Girls	Hina Tanigawa	"Be My Baby (Japanese ver.)" (Wonder Girls)	Eliminated	
2	5PM	Mako Yamaguchi (leader)	"Again & Again (Japanese ver.)" (2PM)	1	Won
2	5PM	Ayaka Arai	"Again & Again (Japanese ver.)" (2PM)	14	Runner-up
2	5PM	Kyoka Taniya	"Again & Again (Japanese ver.)" (2PM)	Eliminated	
2	5PM	Moeno Yamashiro	"Again & Again (Japanese ver.)" (2PM)	Eliminated	
2	5PM	Akari Inoue	"Again & Again (Japanese ver.)" (2PM)	11	Safe
3	Team Dalla Dalla	Nina Hillman (leader)	"Dalla Dalla" (Itzy)	7	Runner-up
3	Team Dalla Dalla	Yuna	"Dalla Dalla" (Itzy)	6	Won
3	Team Dalla Dalla	Ririka Kishida	"Dalla Dalla" (Itzy)	Eliminated	
3	Team Dalla Dalla	Mayuka Ogou	"Dalla Dalla" (Itzy)	13	Safe
3	Team Dalla Dalla	Erina Hanada	"Dalla Dalla" (Itzy)	Eliminated	
4	Miss G	Riku Oe (leader)	"Bad Girl Good Girl" (Miss A)	5	Won
4	Miss G	Rima Yokoi	"Bad Girl Good Girl" (Miss A)	4	Won
4	Miss G	Maya Katsumura	"Bad Girl Good Girl" (Miss A)	3	Won
4	Miss G	Rei Ito	"Bad Girl Good Girl" (Miss A)	Eliminated	
4	Miss G	Funa Takaya	"Bad Girl Good Girl" (Miss A)	Eliminated	
4	Miss G	Ayane Marutani	"Bad Girl Good Girl" (Miss A)	Eliminated	
5	TT Team	Miihi Suzuno (leader)	"TT (Japanese version)" (Twice)	2	Won
5	TT Team	Riria Ikematsu	"TT (Japanese version)" (Twice)	12	Runner-up
5	TT Team	Miu Sakurai	"TT (Japanese version)" (Twice)	Eliminated	
5	TT Team	Kako Oguri	"TT (Japanese version)" (Twice)	Eliminated	
5	TT Team	Ana Sato	"TT (Japanese version)" (Twice)	Withdrawn	

=== Part 2 ===
The top 14 contestants qualified to attend a boot camp in South Korea for six months, beginning in December 2019. During the next set of evaluations, Park revealed an additional set of four cubes to award to the contestants based on growth, teamwork, image, and a final overall grade. If a contestant ranks in the bottom twice, she is automatically eliminated.

==== Cube 5: Growth ====
In episodes 11 to 13, for the fifth cube, Park evaluated each contestant through the Individual Level Test, assessing her individual improvement. Each contestant chose her own song and performance. The winners of this round are Miihi Suzuno (1st), Mako Yamaguchi (2nd), Riku Oe (3rd), and Maya Katsumura (4th). Everyone else within the top 9 also received cubes as runner-ups. The bottom 4 contestants did not receive cubes, and Akari Inoue (13th) ranked last.

Order	Contestant	Song	Rank	Result
1	Rio Hanabashi	"Lady" (Yubin)	6	Runner-up
2	Akari Inoue	"Good-bye Baby" (Miss A)	13	Last
3	Miihi Suzuno	"Nobody (Rainstone remix)" (Wonder Girls)	1	Won
4	Ayaka Arai	"Precious Love" (Twice)	9	Runner-up
5	Nina Hillman	"Attention" (Charlie Puth)	7	Runner-up
6	Riku Oe	"Who's Your Mama?" (Park Jin-young feat. Jessi)	3	Won
7	Yuna	"I Don't Need a Man" (Miss A)	10	Safe
8	Maya Katsumura	"Touch" (Miss A)	4	Won
9	Mayuka Ogou	"Like This" (Wonder Girls)	8	Runner-up
10	Momoka Hirai	"BDZ (Korean ver.)" (Twice)	12	Safe
11	Riria Ikematsu	"Who's Your Mama?" (Park Jin-young feat. Jessi)	11	Safe
12	Rima Yokoi	"Honey" (Park Jin-young)	5	Runner-up
13	Mako Yamaguchi	"24 Hours" (Sunmi)	2	Won

==== Cube 6: Teamwork ====
In episodes 14 and 15, for the sixth cube, Park assessed the contestants based on teamwork. Songs and heats were assigned randomly. Mako Yamaguchi's team won the first round, while Miihi Suzuno's team won the second round, with both teams earning cubes. Additional cubes were granted to Riku Oe (4th), Akari Inoue (5th), and Nina Hillman (9th) as runner-ups. The remaining contestants did not receive cubes, and Momoka Hirai (13th) ranked last.

Order	Heat	Team	Contestant	Song	Battle Outcome	Rank	Result
1	B	Mr. Mad-eonni	Mako Yamaguchi (leader)	"Swing Baby" (Park Jin-young)	Won	3	Won
1	B	Mr. Mad-eonni	Maya Katsumura	"Swing Baby" (Park Jin-young)	Won	1	Won
1	B	Mr. Mad-eonni	Rio Hanabashi	"Swing Baby" (Park Jin-young)	Won	8	Won
2	B	Heart Maker	Riku Oe (leader)	"Heart Shaker (Japanese version)" (Twice)	Lost	4	Runner-up
2	B	Heart Maker	Yuna	"Heart Shaker (Japanese version)" (Twice)	Lost	12	Safe
2	B	Heart Maker	Momoka Hirai	"Heart Shaker (Japanese version)" (Twice)	Lost	13	Last
3	A	Sun Rise	Miihi Suzuno (leader)	"Very Very Very" (I.O.I)	Won	6	Won
3	A	Sun Rise	Rima Yokoi	"Very Very Very" (I.O.I)	Won	2	Won
3	A	Sun Rise	Ayaka Arai	"Very Very Very" (I.O.I)	Won	7	Won
4	A	Seaside Fairies	Nina Hillman (leader)	"Dance the Night Away" (Twice)	Lost	9	Runner-up
4	A	Seaside Fairies	Mayuka Ogou	"Dance the Night Away" (Twice)	Lost	11	Safe
4	A	Seaside Fairies	Riria Ikematsu	"Dance the Night Away" (Twice)	Lost	10	Safe
4	A	Seaside Fairies	Akari Inoue	"Dance the Night Away" (Twice)	Lost	5	Runner-up

==== Extreme Sports Fest ====
In episodes 15 and 16, the contestants are invited on a day out under the pretense of having a picnic, only for it to be a sports festival aimed to foster their physical endurance and artistic expressions. The Extreme Sports Fest was hosted by 2PM member Wooyoung with Ji Suk-woo as his Japanese interpreter.

The contestants are split into two teams: the Pink Team, consisting of Mako Yamaguchi (leader), Ayaka Arai, Yuna, Mayuka Ogou, Rima Yokoi, Riria Ikematsu, and Riku Oe; and the Mint Team, consisting of Rio Hanabashi (leader), Miihi Suzuno, Akari Inoue, Maya Katsumura, Momoka Hirai, and Nina Hillman. The pink team won, earning tickets to an amusement park.

Game	Score	
Game	Pink Team	Mint Team
Musical chairs	0	50
Limbo	0	50
Charades	50	0
Flip the card	100	0
Total	150	100

==== Cube 7: Image ====
In episodes 17 and 18, for the seventh cube, Park assigned the groups each a song he felt would suit their image. Maya Katsumura's team won, with all team members receiving cubes. Additional cubes were awarded to Mako Yamaguchi (1st), Rio Hanabashi (2nd), Mayuka Ogou (3rd), Rima Yokoi (6th), Nina Hillman (8th), and Riria Ikematsu (9th) as runner-ups. Momoka Hirai (13th) was eliminated for ranking last in two rounds.

Order	Team	Contestant	Song	Battle Outcome	Rank	Result
1	Iris	Maya Katsumura (leader)	"Feel Special" (Twice)	1st place	5	Won
1	Iris	Miihi Suzuno	"Feel Special" (Twice)	1st place	11	Won
1	Iris	Akari Inoue	"Feel Special" (Twice)	1st place	4	Won
1	Iris	Yuna	"Feel Special" (Twice)	1st place	7	Won
2	2K5	Mako Yamaguchi (leader)	"Heartbeat" (2PM)	3rd place	1	Runner-up
2	2K5	Riku Oe	"Heartbeat" (2PM)	3rd place	10	Safe
2	2K5	Mayuka Ogou	"Heartbeat" (2PM)	3rd place	3	Runner-up
2	2K5	Ayaka Arai	"Heartbeat" (2PM)	3rd place	12	Safe
2	2K5	Momoka Hirai	"Heartbeat" (2PM)	3rd place	13	Eliminated
3	We Bling	Rima Yokoi (leader)	"Icy" (Itzy)	2nd place	6	Runner-up
3	We Bling	Nina Hillman	"Icy" (Itzy)	2nd place	8	Runner-up
3	We Bling	Rio Hanabashi	"Icy" (Itzy)	2nd place	2	Runner-up
3	We Bling	Riria Ikematsu	"Icy" (Itzy)	2nd place	9	Runner-up

==== Cube 8: Finals ====
In episodes 19 and 20, the finals were split into two rounds for the final cube, which determined whether the contestant was selected for the debuting girl group. The groups were evaluated by Park, 2PM member Wooyoung and Twice member Momo.

In both rounds, the teams would perform new songs originally composed by Park. For the first round, Mako Yamaguchi's team performed "Beyond the Rainbow" and Maya Katsumura's team performed "Boom Boom Boom", with Katsumura's team winning. In the second round, both teams performed "Make You Happy", with Yamaguchi's team winning. During the rank announcements, Park announced the top 9 contestants, who were chosen to debut in NiziU.

Team	Contestant	Round 1			Round 2			Rank	Result
Team	Contestant	Order	Song	Battle Outcome	Order	Song	Battle Outcome	Rank	Result
Mako Team	Mako Yamaguchi (leader)	1	"Beyond the Rainbow"	Lost	1	"Make You Happy"	Won	1	Won
Mako Team	Rio Hanabashi	1	"Beyond the Rainbow"	Lost	1	"Make You Happy"	Won	4	Won
Mako Team	Akari Inoue	1	"Beyond the Rainbow"	Lost	1	"Make You Happy"	Won	—N/a	Eliminated
Mako Team	Yuna	1	"Beyond the Rainbow"	Lost	1	"Make You Happy"	Won	—N/a	Eliminated
Mako Team	Riria Ikematsu	1	"Beyond the Rainbow"	Lost	1	"Make You Happy"	Won	—N/a	Eliminated
Mako Team	Ayaka Arai	1	"Beyond the Rainbow"	Lost	1	"Make You Happy"	Won	8	Won
Maya Team	Maya Katsumura (leader)	2	"Boom Boom Boom"	Won	2	"Make You Happy"	Lost	5	Won
Maya Team	Mayuka Ogou	2	"Boom Boom Boom"	Won	2	"Make You Happy"	Lost	7	Won
Maya Team	Rima Yokoi	2	"Boom Boom Boom"	Won	2	"Make You Happy"	Lost	3	Won
Maya Team	Riku Oe	2	"Boom Boom Boom"	Won	2	"Make You Happy"	Lost	2	Won
Maya Team	Nina Hillman	2	"Boom Boom Boom"	Won	2	"Make You Happy"	Lost	9	Won
Maya Team	Miihi Suzuno	2	"Boom Boom Boom"	Won	2	"Make You Happy"	Lost	6	Won

== Aftermath ==
- The top 9 finalists debuted as NiziU.
Other contestants
- Some trainees formed/joined with groups:
  - Kyoka Taniya debuted in Give & Give, a girl group managed by CyberAgent, and left to join Toi Toi Toi, under ASOBISYSTEM.
  - Ririka Kishida debuted in ILY:1, a South Korean girl group managed by FC ENM.
  - Miu Sakurai debuted in ME:I, a Japanese girl group managed by Lapone Entertainment.
  - Akari Inoue debuted in ELSEE.
- Some trainees participated in other survival shows:
  - Ririka Kishida and Miu Sakurai competed in Mnet's reality competition program, Girls Planet 999, as members of its Japanese division, J-Group.
  - Funa Takaya competed in JTBC's reality competition program, R U Next?, as a Belift Lab trainee.
  - Miu Sakurai will compete in TBS and Lemino's reality competition program, Produce 101 Japan The Girls.

== Sequel ==
On July 12, 2021, Park held a press conference announcing that Nizi Project will have a second season to create a Japanese boy band originally set for debut in March 2023. Applications for boys from 14 to 22 years old were open from July 2021 to October 2021. Auditions took place from November to December 2021 in eight cities in Japan, as well as Seoul in South Korea and New York and Los Angeles in the United States. The contestants were evaluated in five categories: vocal, dance, rap, modeling, and composing/lyricism. The members for the group were finalized and announced in December 2023, eventually debuting as Nexz.
