= Love Emotion (NiziU song) =

2025 single by NiziU

Single by NiziU

from the album New Emotion
- Language: Japanese
- Released: October 17, 2025
- Length: 3:41
- Label: Epic Japan
- Composers: Justin Reinstein; JJean; Phil Schwan
- Lyricist: Mayu Wakisaka

NiziU singles chronology
"What if" (2025)	"Love Emotion" (2025)	"Too Bad" (2026)

Music video
- "Love Emotion" on YouTube

"Love Emotion" (stylized as "♡Emotion") is a song recorded by Japanese girl group NiziU. It was released by Epic Records Japan on October 16, 2025, as a digital single from their third studio album New Emotion.

== Release ==
"Love Emotion" was pre-released as a digital single on October 17, 2019, along with its accompanying music video which was directed by Seong of Digipedi, and was officially released with the album New Emotion on November 19.

== Composition ==
"Love Emotion" was composed by Justin Reinstein, JJean and Phil Schwan with lyrics written by Mayu Wakisaka. Running for 3 minutes and 38 seconds, the song is composed in the key of G Major with a tempo of 174 beats per minute. "Love Emotion" is a song that sings the sensibility of the digital age that depicts the process of approaching the person you like through social media.

== Promotion ==
NiziU performed "Love Emotion" on TV Asahi's Music Station on October 17, 2025, NHK's music program Venue101 on November 8, and Buzz Rhythm 02 on November 28. Their performance was also featured on TBS's Count Down TV on November 17.

== Charts ==
Chart performance for "Love Emotion"
Chart (2025)	Peak position
Japan (Japan Hot 100)	30
Japan (JPN Cmb.)	42

== Release history ==
Release history for "Love Emotion"
Region	Date	Format	Label
Various	October 17, 2025	Digital download; streaming	Epic Records Japan
