= Take a Picture / Poppin' Shakin' =

2021 single by NiziU

- Standard cover

Single by NiziU

from the album U
- Language: Japanese
- Released: April 7, 2021
- Genre: J-pop
- Length: 12:50
- Label: Epic Japan

NiziU singles chronology
"Step and a Step" (2020)	"Take a Picture / Poppin' Shakin'" (2021)	"Super Summer" (2021)

Music videos
- "Take a Picture" on YouTube
- "Poppin' Shakin'" on YouTube

"Take a Picture" / "Poppin' Shakin'" is the second single by Japanese girl group NiziU. It was released as a double A-side single on April 7, 2021, by Epic Records Japan.

== Background and release ==
NiziU released their debut single "Step and a Step" in December 2020. In February 2021, the group announced the release of a double A-side single "Take a Picture / Poppin' Shakin'". "Take a Picture" was written and composed by J. Y. Park, Sim Eunjee, Tim Tan, Mayu Wakisaka, and Ciara Muscat, and arranged by Trippy. "Poppin' Shakin'" was written by Safari Natsukawa, and composed by Ollipop, Hayley Aitken, and Woo Min Lee "collapsedone", the latter of whom also arranged the track. "Take a Picture / Poppin' Shakin'" was released as a CD and digital single on April 7, 2021, through Epic Records Japan. The physical version was made available in a regular edition and two limited editions. The limited edition A of the single also comes with a DVD containing the making of the single.

"Take a Picture" was used in an advertisement campaign for Coca-Cola, while "Poppin' Shakin'" was used for promoting the "NiziU Lab" project, the group's endorsement deal with SoftBank Group.

== Reception ==
"Take a Picture" / "Poppin' Shakin'" took the number one spot on the first day of its release on the Oricon Daily Singles Chart, selling 23,277 units. It debuted at number one on the Weekly Singles Chart, recording over 317,000 physical copies. "Take a Picture" peaked at number one on the Japan Hot 100 on April 7, 2021, and remained there for two consecutive weeks. "Poppin' Shakin'" peaked at number seven on April 14.

== English version ==
The English versions of "Take a Picture" and "Poppin' Shakin'" were released as part of U on November 24, 2021.

== Track listing ==
"Take a Picture / Poppin' Shakin'" track listing
No.	Title	Length
1.	"Take a Picture"	3:01
2.	"Poppin' Shakin'"	3:13
3.	"I Am"	3:36
4.	"Take a Picture (Instrumental)"	3:00
5.	"Poppin' Shakin' (Instrumental)"	3:13
6.	"I Am (Instrumental)"	3:36
Total length:		19:39

== Charts ==
=== Weekly charts ===
Weekly chart performance for "Take a Picture"/"Poppin' Shakin'"
Chart (2021)	Peak position
Japan (Oricon)	1

=== Year-end charts ===
Year-end chart performance for "Take a Picture"/"Poppin' Shakin'"
Chart (2021)	Position
Japan (Japan Hot 100) "Take a Picture"	21
Japan (Japan Hot 100) "Poppin' Shakin'"	60
Japan (Oricon)	20

== Certifications ==
Region	Certification	Certified units/sales
Japan (RIAJ)	Platinum	250,000^{^}
^{^} Shipments figures based on certification alone.

== Release history ==
Release dates and formats for "Take a Picture / Poppin' Shakin'"
Country	Date	Format(s)	Edition	Label	Ref.
Various	April 7, 2021	Digital download; streaming	Regular Edition	Epic Japan	
Various	April 7, 2021	CD + DVD	Limited Edition A	Epic Japan	
Various	April 7, 2021	CD	Limited Edition B	Epic Japan	
