= Make You Happy (EP) =

EP by NiziU
- Released: June 30, 2020
- Recorded: 2020
- Genre: J-pop
- Length: 12:20
- Language: Japanese
- Labels: JYP; Sony Music; Dreamus
- Producer: J. Y. Park

NiziU chronology
Make You Happy (2020)	U (2021)

Music video
- "Make You Happy" on YouTube

Singles from Make You Happy
- 1. "Make You Happy" Released: June 30, 2020

Make You Happy is a pre-debut extended play by Japanese girl group NiziU. It was released on June 30, 2020, by JYP Entertainment and Sony Music Entertainment Japan.

== Background ==
After the debut lineup of NiziU was revealed on Japanese survival reality show Nizi Project, NiziU's website was revealed. Alongside their website, their social media platforms were also opened and it was announced on June 26, 2020, that NiziU's pre-debut EP Make You Happy would be released on June 30, 2020.

== Release and promotion ==
On June 27, 2020, NiziU's social media accounts announced that the EP was available for pre-save and pre-order on local digital media storefronts and streaming services such as Line Music, Recochoku, Rakuten Music and AWA as well as international digital media storefronts and streaming services such as iTunes, Spotify and Apple Music. An event was also announced utilising the services in order to gain more plays.

On June 29, 2020, the short version music video (also known as PV) for "Make You Happy" was released to a bunch of Japanese news and variety morning shows such as Nippon TV's Sukkiri. Following a typical Japanese promotional cycle, the teaser for Make You Happy's music video was then released with a time announced for the official music video release being June 30, 2020, 12am JST/KST.

On June 30, 2020, the music video for "Make You Happy" was released on JYP Entertainment's official YouTube channel.

The digital pre-release EP was also released in Japan through Japanese digital storefronts and streaming services via Sony Music. Korean streaming services such as Melon also received the EP via JYP's distribution label Dreamus.

Make You Happy charted at number 1 on several Japanese streaming services as well digital storefronts on June 30, 2020.

== Korean version ==
"Make You Happy" (Korean version) was released as a digital single on July 15, 2020. The Korean lyrics was written by Lee Haesul.

== Track listing ==
Make You Happy track listing
No.	Title	Writer(s)	Producer(s)	Length
1.	"Make You Happy"	J. Y. Park; Lee Haesul; Yuka Matsumoto	J. Y. Park; Lee Haesul	3:04
2.	"Baby I'm a Star"	J. Y. Park; Yui Kimura	J. Y. Park; Lee Haesul	2:39
3.	"Boom Boom Boom"	KM-MARKIT	KM-MARKIT; Ryuja	3:21
4.	"Beyond the Rainbow" (虹の向こうへ)	Yuka Matsumoto; Hikari Mizuki	collapsedone; Justin Reinstein; JJean	3:16
Total length:				12:25

== Charts ==
Chart performance of Make You Happy
Chart (2020)	Peak position
Japan Hot Albums (Billboard Japan)	1
Japanese Digital Albums (Oricon)	1
