= U (NiziU album) =

- Original and special edition cover

Studio album by NiziU
- Released: November 24, 2021
- Recorded: 2020–2021
- Genre: J-pop
- Length: 40:31 (Type A); 1:02:27 (Type B)
- Languages: Japanese; Korean; English
- Label: Epic Japan
- Producer: J. Y. Park

NiziU chronology
Make You Happy (2020)	U (2021)	Coconut (2023)

Singles from U
- 1. "Make You Happy" Released: June 30, 2020; 2. "Step and a Step" Released: November 25, 2020; 3. "Take a Picture" Released: March 29, 2021; 4. "Poppin’ Shakin’" Released: April 7, 2021; 5. "Super Summer" Released: July 5, 2021; 6. "Chopstick" Released: November 10, 2021; 7. "Need U" Released: November 20, 2021

U is the debut studio album by Japanese girl group NiziU. It was released on November 24, 2021, through Epic Records Japan. The album has 12 tracks including its 5 singles released previously, the lead single "Chopstick", and the special single "Need U" with an addition of 7 more tracks from the album's limited-edition version B. The album was released in three physical versions, one normal version and two limited edition versions, A and B.

== Track listing ==
U track listing
No.	Title	Lyrics	Music	Arrangement	Length
1.	"Chopstick"	J. Y. Park "The Asiansoul”; Yuka Matsumoto	Park	Park; Lee Hae-sol	2:57
2.	"Take a Picture"	Park; Shim Eun-ji; Tim Tan; Ciara Muscat; Mayu Wakisaka	Park; Trippy; Shim; Tim Tan; Muscat	Trippy	3:01
3.	"Festa"	Kentz	Oliver Fernstrom; Jonathan Bratthall-Tideman; Frankie Day	Fernstrom	3:37
4.	"Make You Happy"	Park; Matsumoto	Park; Lee	Park; Lee	3:06
5.	"Wonder Dream"	Kentz	Shim; Lee	Lee	3:13
6.	"Twinkle Twinkle"	Wakisaka	Hotsauce; B-rock; J-lin	Hotsauce; B-rock; J-lin	3:09
7.	"Poppin’ Shakin’"	Safari Natsuwaka	Lee Woo-min "Collapsedone"; Ollipop; Hayley Aitken	Lee Woo-min "Collapsedone"	3:15
8.	"I Am"	Kentz	Kentz; Junya Maesako; Yui Mugino	Kentz	3:36
9.	"Super Summer"	Matsumoto; Anna Timgren; Charlotte Wilson	Trippy; Timgren; Wilson	Trippy	3:03
10.	"Step and a Step"	Park; Yui Kimura; Kentz	Park	Park; Lee	3:21
11.	"9 Colors"	Kanata Okajima; Soma Genda	Earattack	Earattack; Larmook	3:53
12.	"Need U"	Okajima; Genda	Okajima; Genda; MEG	Genda; MEG	4:13
Total length:					40:31

CD 2 track listing — Limited B edition
No.	Title	Lyrics	Music	Arrangement	Length
1.	"Baby I’m a Star"	J. Y. Park "The Asiansoul”; Yui Kimura	Park	Park; Lee Hae-sol	2:39
2.	"Boom Boom Boom"	KM-Markit	KM-Markit; Ryuja	Ryuja	3:21
3.	"Beyond the Rainbow" (虹の向こうへ)	Yuka Matsumoto; Hikari Mizuki	Lee Woo-min "Collapsedone"; Justin Reinstein; JJean	Lee Woo-min "Collapsedone"; Reinstein	3:16
4.	"Make You Happy" (Korean version)	Park; Matsumoto	Park; Lee	Park; Lee	3:04
5.	"Step and a Step" (Korean version)	Park; Kimura; Kentz	Park	Park; Lee	3:21
6.	"Take a Picture" (English version)	Park; Trippy; Shim Eun-ji; Tim Tan; Ciara Muscat; Mayu Wakisaka	Park; Trippy; Shim; Tim Tan; Muscat	Hotsauce; B-rock; J-lin	3:01
7.	"Poppin’ Shakin’" (English version)	Safari Natsuwaka	Lee Woo-min "Collapsedone"; Ollipop; Hayley Aitken	Lee Woo-min "Collapsedone"	3:13
Total length:					21:55

DVD — Limited A edition
No.	Title	Length
1.	"U" (Jacket Shooting Making Movie)
2.	"Make You Happy" (Music Video)
3.	"Step and a Step" (Music Video)
4.	"Take a Picture" (Music Video)
5.	"Poppin’ Shakin’" (Music Video)
6.	"Chopstick" (Music Video)
7.	"Need U" (Music Video)
8.	"Need U" (Music Video Making Movie)
9.	"Need U" (Special Interview)

== Charts ==
=== Weekly charts ===
Weekly chart performance of U
Chart (2021)	Peak position
Japanese Albums (Oricon)	1
Japanese Combined Albums (Oricon)	1
Japanese Hot Albums (Billboard Japan)	1

=== Monthly charts ===
Monthly chart performance for U
Chart (2021)	Peak position
Japanese Albums (Oricon)	3

=== Year-end charts ===
Year-end chart performance for U
Chart (2021)	Position
Japanese Albums (Oricon)	16
Japanese Hot Albums (Billboard Japan)	26
Chart (2022)	Position
Japanese Hot Albums (Billboard Japan)	46
