= Asobo (song) =

Single by NiziU

from the album Coconut
- Language: Japanese
- Released: April 12, 2022
- Length: 2:58
- Label: Epic Japan
- Composers: Noisecastle III; Tommy Parker; Alex Wright; Oscar Free
- Lyricist: Mayu Wakisaka

NiziU singles chronology
"Need U" (2021)	"Asobo" (2022)	"Clap Clap" (2022)

Music video
- "Asobo" on YouTube

"Asobo" is a song recorded by Japanese girl group NiziU. It was released by Epic Records Japan on April 12, 2022, as a digital single from their second studio album Coconut.

== Background and release ==
On April 2, 2022, JYP Entertainment announced through their social media accounts that NiziU would release a digital single on April 12. A group photo released with the news shows NiziU smiling brightly in a place full of cute props.

== Composition ==
"Asobo" was composed by Noisecastle III, Tommy Parker, Alex Wright and Oscar Free with lyrics written by Mayu Wakisaka. Running for 2 minutes and 58 seconds, the song is composed in the key of B-sharp major with a tempo of 118 beats per minute. "Asobo" means "let's play" in Japanese and features the bright and positive message that "If you have a playful spirit, you can change and enjoy everyday life".

== Promotion ==
NiziU first performed "Asobo" on Nippon TV's Sukkiri on April 12, 2022, TV Asahi's Music Station on April 15, NHK's music program Venue101 on April 16, and TBS's Count Down TV on April 18.

== Music video ==
The music video of "Asobo" is filled with colorful visual beauty, with the performance of the nine members added with the theme of 'fun'. The video reached ten million views in three days and was directed by SL8IGHT Visual Lab.

== Charts ==
Chart performance for "Asobo"
Chart (2022)	Peak position
Japan (Japan Hot 100)	5
Japan (JPN Cmb.)	9

== Release history ==
Release history for "Asobo"
Region	Date	Format	Label
Various	April 12, 2022	Digital download; streaming	Epic Records Japan
