= Chopstick (song) =

Single by NiziU

from the album U
- Language: Japanese
- Released: November 10, 2021
- Length: 2:58
- Label: Epic Japan
- Composer: Park Jin-young
- Lyricists: Park Jin-young; Yuka Matsumoto

NiziU singles chronology
"Super Summer" (2021)	"Chopstick" (2021)	"Need U" (2022)

Music video
- "Chopstick" on YouTube

"Chopstick" is a song recorded by Japanese girl group NiziU. It was released by Epic Records Japan on November 10, 2021, as a digital single from their first studio album U.

== Composition ==
"Chopstick" was written and composed by JYP Entertainment founder Park Jin-young; lyrics were also written by Yuka Matsumoto and arranged by Lee Hae-sol. Running for 2 minutes and 58 seconds, the song is composed in the key of C Major with a tempo of 141 beats per minute. The song is based on the content that it is happier to have someone you can rely on like chopsticks, and sings the strong heart that if there are fans who support NiziU, they can give strength anywhere.

== Promotion ==
On November 19, NiziU first performed "Chopstick" on TV Asahi's Music Station, NHK's music program Shibuya Note on November 20, Buzz Rhythm 02 On November 26 and Utacon on November 30, 2021.

== Music video ==
The "Chopstick" music video, which stands out with the group's unique bright energy and powerful group dance, exceeded fifteen million YouTube views in the first week. It was directed by Naive Creative Production. A second music video was released on December 31, 2021, called 'Another ver' and was also directed by Naive Creative Production.

== Charts ==
Chart performance for "Chopstick"
Chart (2021)	Peak position
Japan (Japan Hot 100)	7
Japan (JPN Cmb.)	9

== Certifications ==
Streaming certifications for "Chopstick"
Region	Certification	Certified units/sales
Japan (RIAJ)	Gold	50,000,000^{†}
^{†} Streaming-only figures based on certification alone.

== Release history ==
Release history for "Chopstick"
Region	Date	Format	Label
Various	November 10, 2021	Digital download; streaming	Epic Records Japan
