= Love Line (NiziU song) =

Single by NiziU

from the EP Love Line
- Language: Korean
- Released: March 31, 2025
- Length: 3:12
- Label: JYP
- Composers: chAN's; Jin (Take A Chance); Dainasaurs
- Lyricist: Lee Hye Yum

NiziU singles chronology
"Yoake" (2025)	"Love Line" (2025)

Music video
- "Love Line" on YouTube

Professional ratings
Review scores
Source	Rating
IZM	2.5/5 stars

"Love Line" is a song recorded by Japanese girl group NiziU for their second single album Love Line. It was released as the single album’s lead single by JYP Entertainment on March 31, 2025.

== Release ==
On March 10, 2025, JYP Entertainment announced that NiziU would release their second Korean single album Love Line on March 31, their first Korean release since their debut single album Press Play in October 2023. Love Line includes two tracks, "Love Line" and "What If". The Japanese version of "Love Line" was released as a digital single on May 26, 2025, with lyrics written by Mayu Wakisaka.

== Composition ==
"Love Line" Is written by Lee Hye Yum and composed by chAN's, Jin (Take A Chance) and Dainasaurs. The song is based on the story of 'It is connected to the fateful partner with a red thread', and expresses the desire to become a special fate that cannot be separated from the partner in love, in NiziU's unique style. The song is composed in the key B-minor and has 145 beats per minute and a running time of 3 minutes and 12 seconds.

== Promotion ==
NiziU first performed "Love Line" on April 3 on Mnet's M Countdown. On April 9, they won first place on MBC M's Show Champion.

== Accolades ==
Music program awards
Program	Date	Ref.
Show Champion	April 9, 2025	

== Charts ==
Chart (2025)	Peak position
Japan Combined Singles (Oricon)	39
Japan (Japan Hot 100)	41
South Korea (Circle Download)	43
UK Singles Sales (OCC)	84

== Release history ==
Release history for "Love Line"
Region	Date	Format	Label
Various	March 31, 2025	Digital download; streaming	JYP
