= Coconut (NiziU album) =

- Digital cover

Studio album by NiziU
- Released: July 19, 2023
- Recorded: 2022–2023
- Genre: J-pop
- Length: 31:45
- Languages: Japanese; English
- Label: Epic Japan
- Producer: J. Y. Park

NiziU chronology
| U (2021) | Coconut (2023) | Press Play (2023) |

Singles from Coconut
- 1. "Asobo" Released: April 12, 2022; 2. "Clap Clap" Released: July 20, 2022; 3. "Paradise" Released: March 8, 2023; 4. "Coconut" Released: June 29, 2023

Coconut is the second studio album by Japanese girl group NiziU. It was released on July 19, 2023, through Epic Records Japan. The album has 10 tracks including the lead single, "Coconut", and three previously released singles. In addition, there are four bonus tracks on the album's limited-edition version B.

== Background and release ==
On May 10, 2023, JYP Entertainment announced that NiziU would release their second studio album, Coconut, on July 19. The title of the group's second Japanese tour, NiziU Live With U 2023 "Coco! nut Fes.", was announced at the same time. The album's tracklist was revealed on June 18, including unit songs with lyrics written by the members (only included on limited edition B). The lead single, "Coconut", was pre-released digitally on June 29 with an accompanying music video. The album, excluding bonus tracks, was pre-released digitally on July 5. On July 19, the album was released in 12 physical versions: one normal version, two limited edition versions (A and B), and nine solo cover "WithU" versions.

== Promotion ==
NiziU performed "Coconut" for the first time on TV Tokyo's summer music special, TV Tokyo Music Festival 2023 Summer, on June 28. The album's second track, "Look at Me", was selected as the theme song for Nippon TV's drama series Kocchi Muite yo Mukai-kun. NiziU performed "Look at Me" on Nippon TV's music program, The Music Day, on July 1. All songs from the album, except for "Take It", were performed during NiziU's second Japanese tour, which began July 1. The group also performed "Coconut" on TV Asahi's Music Station and NHK's Venue101.

== Commercial performance ==
Coconut debuted at number 1 on the weekly Oricon Albums Chart with 142,000 copies sold. This was the highest first week album sales for a female artist in 2023, until it was surpassed by MiSaMo's Masterpiece the following week. Coconut also topped the Billboard Japan Hot Albums chart, selling 179,847 copies and 623 downloads.

== Track listing ==
Coconut — Standard edition
| No. | Title | Lyrics | Music | Arrangement | Length |
|---|---|---|---|---|---|
| 1. | "Coconut" | J.Y. Park "The Asiansoul"; Mayu Wakisaka | Lee Hae-sol; Mayu Wakisaka | Lee Hae-sol | 2:58 |
| 2. | "Look at Me" | Kentz | Kentz; Junya Maesako; Yui Mugino | Kentz | 3:13 |
| 3. | "Short Trip" | Yuka Matsumoto | Nicklas Eklund; Anna Sahlene | Nicklas Eklund | 3:36 |
| 4. | "Paradise" | Akira; Bang Chan (3Racha); Changbin (3Racha); Han (3Racha) | Bang Chan (3Racha); Changbin (3Racha); Han (3Racha); Versachoi | Versachoi; Bang Chan (3Racha) | 3:29 |
| 5. | "Asobo" | Mayu Wakisaka | Noisecastle III; Tommy Parker; Alex Wright; Oscar Free | Noisecastle III; Tommy Parker; Alex Wright; Oscar Free | 3:03 |
| 6. | "Prism" | Mayu Wakisaka | Scott Russell Stoddart; Anna Timgren | Scott Russell Stoddart | 3:44 |
| 7. | "All Right" | Mayu Wakisaka | Benny Jansson; Molly Rosenstrom | Benny Jansson | 3:19 |
| 8. | "Clap Clap" | Kentz; Trippy | Trippy; Charlotte Wilson (The Hub); Frankie Day (The Hub); The Hub 88 | Trippy | 2:44 |
| 9. | "Raindrops" | Mayu Wakisaka | Trippy; Nanna Bottos; Teis Zacho | Trippy | 2:47 |
| 10. | "Love & Like" | Mayu Wakisaka | Alysa; JJean (Number K) | Alysa | 2:52 |
| Total length: | | | | | 31:45 |

Bonus tracks (Note: Bonus tracks are included on the deluxe edition (digital) and CD 2 of the limited B edition (physical).)
| No. | Title | Lyrics | Music | Arrangement | Length |
|---|---|---|---|---|---|
| 11. | "Love Yourself" (Mako, Ayaka, Miihi) | Sim Eun-ji; Mako; Ayaka; Miihi | Sim Eun-ji; Kentz | Kentz | 3:19 |
| 12. | "Secret" (Rio, Maya, Riku) | Rio; Maya; Riku | Justin Reinstein; JJean (Number K) | Justin Reinstein | 3:19 |
| 13. | "Jump" (Mayuka, Rima, Nina) | Mayuka; Rima; Nina | Trippy; Charlotte Wilson (The Hub); The Hub 88 | Trippy | 3:19 |
| 14. | "Take It" (Mayuka, Rima) | Mayuka; Rima | Trippy; Frankie Day (The Hub); Charlotte Wilson (The Hub); Ayushy (The Hub); The Hub 88 | Trippy | 3:18 |
| Total length: | | | | | 45:00 |

DVD — Limited A edition
| No. | Title | Length |
|---|---|---|
| 1. | "Coconut" (Jacket Shooting Making Movie) |
| 2. | "Asobo" (Music Video) |
| 3. | "Clap Clap" (Music Video) |
| 4. | "Paradise" (Music Video) |

== Charts ==
=== Weekly charts ===
Weekly chart performance for Coconut
| Chart (2023) | Peak position |
|---|---|
| Japanese Albums (Oricon) | 1 |
| Japanese Combined Albums (Oricon) | 1 |
| Japanese Hot Albums (Billboard Japan) | 1 |

=== Monthly charts ===
Monthly chart performance for Coconut
| Chart (2023) | Position |
|---|---|
| Japanese Albums (Oricon) | 4 |

=== Year-end charts ===
Year-end chart performance for Coconut
| Chart (2023) | Position |
|---|---|
| Japanese Albums (Oricon) | 26 |
| Japanese Hot Albums (Billboard Japan) | 23 |

== Certifications ==
Certifications for Coconut
| Region | Certification | Certified units/sales |
|---|---|---|
| Japan (RIAJ) | Platinum | 250,000^{^} |
^{^} Shipments figures based on certification alone.
