= Coconut (NiziU song) =

Single by NiziU

from the album Coconut
- Language: Japanese
- Released: June 29, 2023
- Length: 2:58
- Label: Epic Japan
- Composers: Lee Hae-sol; Mayu Wakisaka
- Lyricists: Park Jin-young; Mayu Wakisaka

NiziU singles chronology
"Paradise" (2023)	"Coconut" (2023)	"Memories" (2024)

Music video
- "Coconut" on YouTube

"Coconut" is a song recorded by Japanese girl group NiziU. It was released by Epic Records Japan on June 29, 2023, as a digital single from their second studio album of the same name.

== Composition ==
"Coconut" was composed by Mayu Wakisaka and Lee Hae-sol with lyrics written by J. Y. Park "The Asiansoul" and Mayu Wakisaka. Running for 2 minutes and 58 seconds, the song is composed in the key of E minor with a tempo of 115 beats per minute. "Coconut" is a song that harmonises the sound reminiscent of a summer paradise, such as birdsong and South American percussion, and the performance of various instruments such as guitar, saxophone, and drums. In particular, 'Coco' means 'here' in Japanese.

== Promotion ==
NiziU performed "Coconut" for the first time on TV Tokyo's summer music special, TV Tokyo Music Festival 2023 Summer, on June 28, 2023. They also performed the song on Buzz Rhythm 02 on July 14, TV Asahi's Music Station on July 21, and NHK's music program Venue101 on July 22.

== Music video ==
The music video was directed by Sunny Visual, and shows the refreshing energy of the nine members, by using bright colors and pastel tones.

== Personnel ==
Credits adapted from Melon.

- NiziU – vocals
- J.Y. Park "The Asiansoul" – lyrics
- Mayu Wakisaka – lyrics, composer, background vocals, vocal director
- Lee Hae-sol – composer, arranger, synths, keys, vocal director
- Nicki Young – guitar
- Kayone Lee – vocal editor
- Uhm Se-hee – recorder
- Seo Eun-il – recorder
- Lee Tae-seop – mixer
- Chris Gehringer – master

== Charts ==
Chart performance for "Coconut"
Chart (2023)	Peak position
Japan (Japan Hot 100)	30
Japan (JPN Cmb.)	50
