= Step and a Step =

2020 song by NiziU

Single by NiziU

from the album U
- B-side: "Joyful" "Sweet Bomb" "Make You Happy"
- Released: December 2, 2020
- Genre: J-pop
- Length: 3:21
- Label: Epic Japan
- Songwriters: J. Y. Park "The Asiansoul"; Kentz; Yui Kimura
- Producer: J.Y. Park

NiziU singles chronology
"Make You Happy" (2020)	"Step and a Step" (2020)	"Take a Picture / Poppin' Shakin'" (2021)

Music video
- "Step and a Step" on YouTube

"Step and a Step" is a song by Japanese girl group NiziU. It is the group's debut maxi single and includes three other tracks. The song was pre-released digitally on November 25, 2020, and the CD single was released on December 2 by Epic Records Japan.

== Background and release ==
NiziU was formed through the audition program, Nizi Project by JYP Entertainment and Sony Music Entertainment Japan, and is the first Japanese group to be managed by JYP. The group released its pre-debut EP Make You Happy in June 2020, which peaked at number one on both Oricon's digital album's chart and Billboard Japan's Hot Albums chart. Following the commercial success of Make You Happy, NiziU announced the release of their debut Japanese single titled "Step and a Step". Solo jacket album photos for group members Mako, Rio, and Maya, were released simultaneously on October 10. An online autograph session was announced the same day in which NiziU members would fulfill requests from fans. Album jacket photos featuring Riku, Ayaka, and Mayuka, were released on October 11, followed by photos of all members on October 12. In lead-up to the release of the single, an online collaboration campaign between NiziU and Lawson Store began in early-November. Despite participating in the recording of the single and appearing in the music video, Miihi was absent from the dance choreography portion and promotions for the single due to going on hiatus for health problems from October to December 2020.

On November 25, 2020, "Step and a Step" was pre-released as a digital single on various online music portals in conjunction with the accompanying music video. The CD single was officially released on December 2, 2020. The physical version is available in four different limited editions: Regular Edition, First Press Limited Edition A and First Press Limited Edition B, and Fan Club Edition (With U Limited Edition). Edition A comes with a CD and a DVD containing the music video of "Step and a Step" and the making of album jacket photos. Edition B contains a CD and a 28-page booklet while the regular edition includes only the CD. All three versions contain "Step and a Step" as A-side and three other tracks "Joyful", "Sweet Bomb" and "Make You Happy" as B-side. The fanclub edition comes with the CD featuring only "Step and a Step" and "Joyful".

== Composition ==
"Step and a Step" has lyrics written by Kentz, Yui Kimura, and Park Jin-young, with the latter also serving as the composer. Park Jin-young produced the track alongside Lee Hae-sol. A youthful and energetic pop song with an "addictive" rhythm, its lyrics convey "a warm message" that is intended to heal listeners during the COVID-19 pandemic, through lines like, "It's okay if you go slowly, step by step, at your own pace".

== Music video ==
The music video for the song was uploaded to JYP Entertainment's YouTube channel on November 25, 2020. The music video is magical and features NiziU dressed in immaculate, white dresses as the members are seen performing choreography in multiple colorful settings. The video also includes a "rabbit" dance during the song's chorus.

== Promotion ==
A documentary series titled We NiziU: We need U began airing on Hulu from November 5, 2020, focussing on NiziU's journey towards their official debut. To commemorate the release of group's debut single, a one-time commercial featuring "Step and a Step" would be aired on NTV on November 25, 2020. In addition, 15-second solo commercials featuring each NiziU member would be broadcast on the Nippon TV affiliated stations of Kansai, Chubu, Hokkaido, Fukuoka, Miyagi and Okinawa corresponding to the home-towns of each member, from November 26 to December 2. "Step and a Step" was first performed on Nippon TV's Best Artist 2020 year-end programme on November 25.

== Korean version ==
"Step and a step" (Korean version) was released as part of the limited edition B of U on November 24, 2021.

== Track listing ==
Digital download
No.	Title	Lyrics	Music	Arrangement	Length
1.	"Step and a Step"	J.Y. Park "The Asiansoul"; Kentz; Yui Kimura	J.Y. Park "The Asiansoul"	J.Y. Park "The Asiansoul"; Lee Hae-sol	3:21
2.	"Joyful"	Kentz	Kentz; Junya Maesako; Yui Mugino	Kentz	3:30
3.	"Sweet Bomb"	Safari Natsukawa	Trippy; Tim Tan; Ciara Muscat	Trippy	2:55
4.	"Make You Happy"	J.Y. Park "The Asiansoul"; Yuka Matsumoto	J.Y. Park "The Asiansoul"; Lee Hae-sol	J.Y. Park "The Asiansoul"; Lee Hae-sol	3:04
Total length:					12:50

First press limited edition A DVD
No.	Title	Length
1.	"Step and a Step" (Music video)
2.	"Step and a Step" (Jacket shooting making movie)

== Charts ==
=== Weekly charts ===
Weekly chart performance for "Step and a Step"
Chart (2020)	Peak position
Global 200 (Billboard)	75
Japan (Japan Hot 100)	1
Japan (Oricon)	1

=== Year-end charts ===
Year-end chart performance for "Step and a Step"
Chart (2021)	Position
Japan (Japan Hot 100)	12

== Certifications ==
Region	Certification	Certified units/sales
Japan (RIAJ) CD	Platinum	250,000^{^}
Japan (RIAJ) Digital	Gold	100,000^{*}
Streaming
Japan (RIAJ)	Platinum	100,000,000^{†}
^{*} Sales figures based on certification alone.^{^} Shipments figures based on certification alone.^{†} Streaming-only figures based on certification alone.
