= NiziU =

Japanese girl group

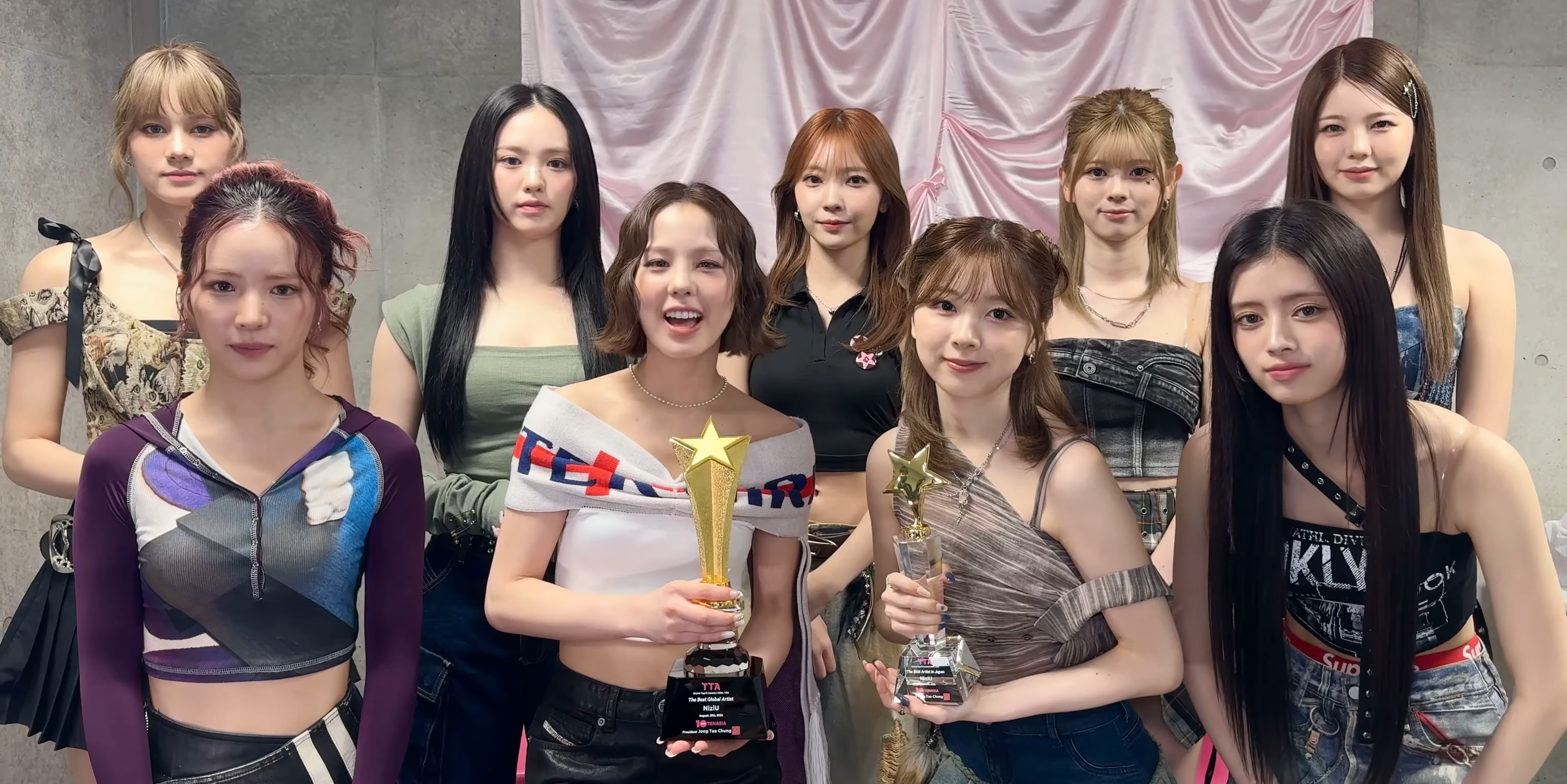
- NiziU in October 2024; L–R: Nina, Maya, Rio, Mako, Mayuka, Miihi, Riku, Rima, and Ayaka

Background information
- Origin: Seoul, South Korea; Tokyo, Japan
- Genres: K-pop; J-pop
- Years active: 2020–present
- Labels: JYP; Sony Music
- Member of: JYP Nation
- Members: Mako; Rio; Maya; Riku; Ayaka; Mayuka; Rima; Miihi; Nina
- Website: niziu.com

Japanese name
- Katakana: ニジュー
Transcriptions
- Revised Hepburn: Nijū
- Kunrei-shiki: Nizyû

Korean name
- Hangul: 니쥬
- RR: Niju
- MR: Niju

NiziU (Japanese: ニジュー; Korean: 니쥬) is a Japanese girl group formed by JYP Entertainment and Sony Music Entertainment Japan through the reality-survival program Nizi Project (2020). The group is composed of nine members: Mako, Rio, Maya, Riku, Ayaka, Mayuka, Rima, Miihi, and Nina. Active in both Japan and Korea, NiziU debuted on December 2, 2020, with the release of their debut single "Step and a Step", and made their Korean debut on October 30, 2023, with the release of their single album "Press Play".

== Career ==
=== 2020: Formation and debut ===
On January 29, 2019, JYP Entertainment announced their plans of creating a Japanese girl group, under their vision "K-pop 3.0", "Globalization by Localization". Auditions for this new girl group took place in eight Japanese cities, Hawaii, and Los Angeles, for females aged between 15 and 22 years old. NiziU was formed through Nizi Project, featuring 26 contestants and was aired weekly on Hulu Japan from January 31 to June 26, 2020. It was distributed internationally through JYP Entertainment's official YouTube channel. The show was split up into two seasons: the first season showing the auditions of prospective members around Japan, cutting the prospective lineup to 14 from 26 girls chosen by J.Y. Park; and the second season showing the girls moving to train in South Korea for six months.

On the final episode of Nizi Project, the debut line-up was revealed to the public. As a recording artist under JYP Entertainment, the group is announced to have partnered with record company Sony Music Japan for album sales and group management during their activities in Japan.

The group's digital pre-debut EP, Make You Happy, was pre-released on June 30 in Japan and South Korea, before being released internationally on July 1, 2020. It was a commercial success, topping Billboard Japan's Hot Albums chart and Oricon's Digital Albums chart. The album's eponymous lead single topped several major Japanese music charts such as Line Music, AWA, and Rakuten, while debuting at number two on the Billboard Japan Hot 100. "Make You Happy" was also an international success for the group, with the track debuting at number 84 on the Billboard Global Excl. U.S. chart and at number 192 on the Billboard Global 200 chart on its issue dated September 19. On October 14, "Make You Happy" recorded a cumulative number of 100 million streams within 15 weeks of charting on the Japan Hot 100, tying with Official Hige Dandism's "I Love..." and Eito's "Kōsui", with NiziU becoming the fastest female artist to achieve the feat.

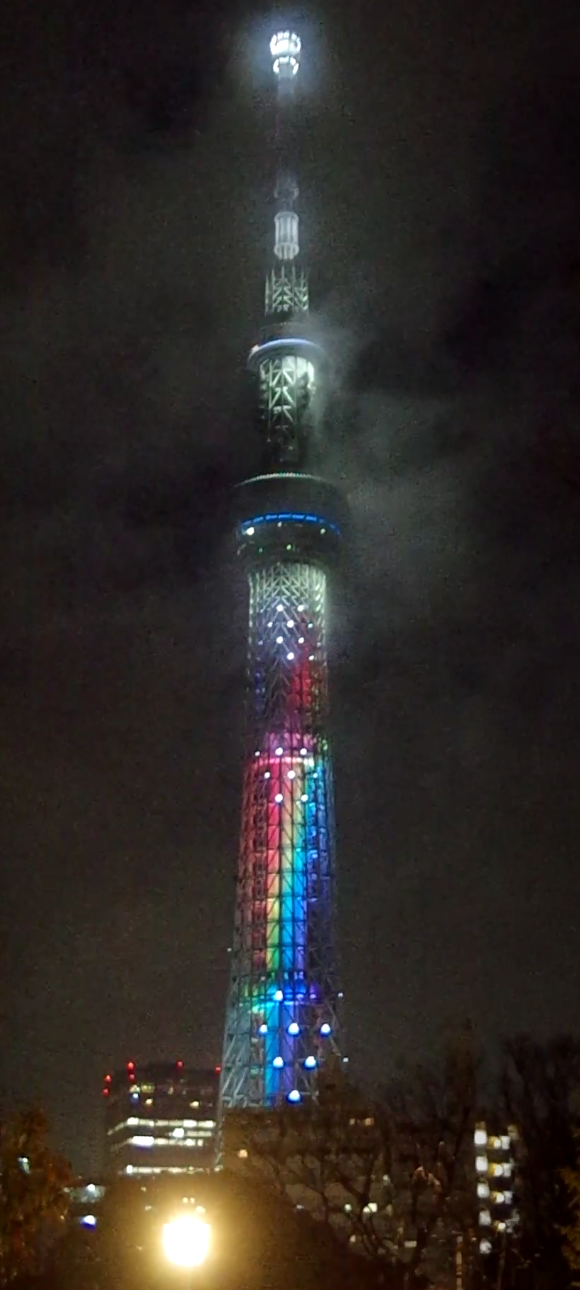
In commemoration of NiziU's official debut, Tokyo Skytree was lit up in rainbow colors.

In August 2020, Mako, Miihi, Maya, Ayaka, Rio, and Rima made cameo appearances in the music video for "God's Menu" by Stray Kids. In September 2020, all of the members of NiziU appeared in the music video for "Back Door" by Stray Kids with the exception of Miihi, who could not appear due to attending school. From October 23 to December 20, 2020, Miihi briefly went on hiatus for health problems and was absent for most of NiziU's debut promotions. On November 25, 2020, NiziU released the full version music video of their debut single, "Step and a Step." A week later, on December 2, 2020, they officially debuted in Japan with the single's physical release. "Step and a Step" topped Japan's Oricon Singles Chart with 312,000 copies sold within the first week, becoming the second best selling debut single by a female artist in Japan (second only to Hinatazaka46's "Kyun"). The song also topped the Billboard Japan Hot 100, becoming the group's first chart-topper as it sold 318,562 copies in its first week. "Step and a Step" also marked the group's second entry on the Billboard Global Excl. U.S. wherein they charted at number 149 on its issue dated December 5, as well as the Billboard Global 200, with NiziU charting at number 75 on its issue dated December 12.

Despite making their official Japanese debut only on December 2, NiziU performed at the 71st NHK Kōhaku Uta Gassen, the top-rated annual year-end musical show in Japan. They became the fastest artist to have appeared in a Kōhaku Uta Gassen, making their appearance only 29 days after their debut. By the end of the year, it was reported that NiziU ranked high on several Billboard Japan Year-End charts, with the group charting at number 7 on the Year-End Albums, number 13 on the Year-End Streaming, and ranking at number 15 on the Top Artist Chart. The group became one of five recipients of the Special Achievement Award at the 62nd Japan Record Awards.

=== 2021: "Take a Picture" / "Poppin' Shakin", and first studio album ===
On January 20, 2021, the group revealed several planned activities for the year through a video released on their official YouTube channel titled "We need U 2021." Future activities include the group's first live showcase, an upcoming second single alongside their first studio album, and the release of their first English song, among others.

NiziU uploaded the music video of their double A-side single "Take a Picture" on March 29, 2021, with the song topping the real-time charts of several major Japanese music sites. In collaboration with Coca-Cola, the song was used for a local commercial of the said product. The song received over 12.5 million streams in its first week, surpassing the first-week streaming numbers of "Step and a Step" and setting an all-time record high on the weekly Oricon Streaming Chart. "Take a Picture / Poppin' Shakin'" was then officially released on April 7, 2021, wherein "Poppin' Shakin'" was used for a commercial in collaboration with Japanese telecommunication company Softbank. The single recorded sales of over 317,000 copies in its first week. On November 24, 2021, NiziU released their first studio album U, along with its lead single "Chopstick".

=== 2022–2023: Concert tours, second studio album, and Korean debut ===
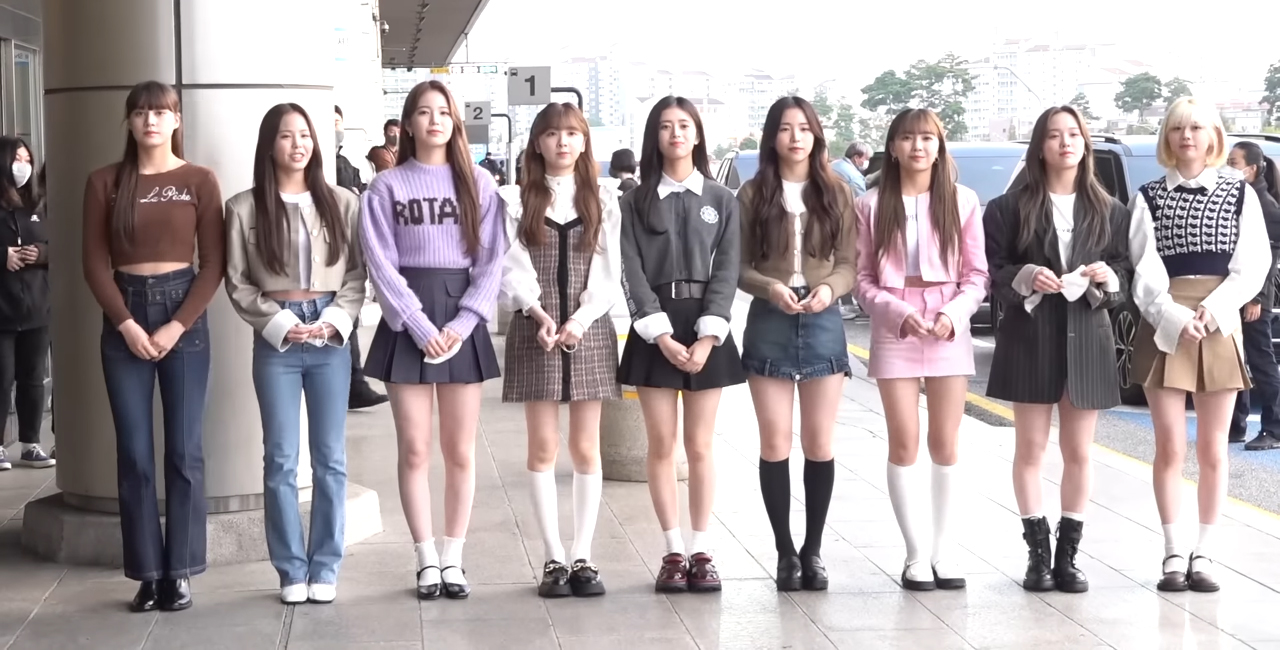
NiziU in October 2022

On April 12, 2022, NiziU released the digital single "Asobo". The English version of the single was released two weeks later. On May 8, the group had their first appearance at KCON in Seoul, South Korea. However, member Rio was not present for their premiere performance due to a sudden illness in the midst of their rehearsal. On July 20, NiziU released their single "Clap Clap". NiziU embarked on their first Japanese tour, Light it Up, originally scheduled from July 23 to September 17, but was then delayed to August 13 and finally concluded on October 5. This was followed by their first Japanese dome tour, Burn it Up, held at Tokyo Dome and Kyocera Dome Osaka from November 12 to December 18. In between concerts, NiziU released their first ballad single, "Blue Moon", on December 14. At the last concert, it was announced that the group's single "Paradise" had been selected as the theme song for the movie Doraemon: Nobita's Sky Utopia, released in Japan in March 2023.

NiziU's second studio album, Coconut, was released on July 19, 2023. The group embarked on their second Japanese tour in support of the album, with performances from July 1 to September 18. The tour had a total audience of 185,000 across 17 concerts. On October 30, NiziU debuted in South Korea with a single album titled Press Play and its lead single, "Heartris". They earned their first Korean broadcast win for "Heartris" on the November 8 episode of Show Champion.

=== 2024–present: Concert tours and third studio album ===
On February 6, 2024, NiziU released the song "Memories" as part of an advertising campaign for Universal Studios Japan. On March 14, they released the song "Sweet Nonfiction" for the soundtrack of the Japanese film Lovesick Ellie. On July 24, the group released the EP Rise Up, which includes the opening and ending theme songs for the second season of anime Tower of God. That same month, NiziU announced that their third Japanese tour would begin on November 23. The tour was in support of their EP Awake, which released on February 5, 2025. At the last concert in Fukuoka, it was announced that NiziU would embark on a hall tour in September 2025 and an arena tour in February 2026. They released their second Korean single album, Love Line, on March 31, 2025. They earned their second Korean broadcast win on the April 9 episode of Show Champion. A Japanese version of the single was released two months later on May 26.

Near the end of their fourth Japanese tour, NiziU released a third studio album, New Emotion, on November 19, 2025. This tour was the group's largest yet, with a total of 32 shows in 21 cities. NiziU embarked on their fifth Japanese tour from February 14 to March 29, 2026. Their EP Good Girl But Not For You was released 3 days later on April 1. The group went on a two-weekend dome tour that kicked off on June 6 and concluded on June 14, 2026. On July 1, 2026, NiziU released their greatest hits-based album, Portfolio, celebrating 5 years together as a group. On September 28, 2026, they released their first Korean Extended Play, Sour Grapes. On the October, 7th 2026, episode of Show Champion, NiziU took home their first win for Sour Grapes, making this their third Korean broadcast win overall.

== Members ==
Adapted from NiziU's official website.

- Mako (マコ) (마코)
- Rio (リオ) (리오)
- Maya (マヤ) (마야)
- Riku (リク) (리쿠)
- Ayaka (アヤカ) (아야카)
- Mayuka (マユカ) (마유카)
- Rima (リマ) (리마)
- Miihi (ミイヒ) (미이히)
- Nina (ニナ) (니나)

== Discography ==
- U (2021)
- Coconut (2023)
- New Emotion (2025)

== Concerts and tours ==
=== NiziU Live With U 2022 "Light It Up" ===
Date	City	Country	Venue
August 13, 2022	Fukuoka	Japan	West Japan General Exhibition Center New Wing
August 14, 2022	Fukuoka	Japan	West Japan General Exhibition Center New Wing
August 20, 2022	Sapporo	Japan	Makomanai Ice Arena
August 21, 2022	Sapporo	Japan	Makomanai Ice Arena
August 27, 2022	Rifu	Japan	Sekisui Heim Super Arena
August 28, 2022	Rifu	Japan	Sekisui Heim Super Arena
August 31, 2022	Tokyo	Japan	Yoyogi National Gymnasium
September 1, 2022	Tokyo	Japan	Yoyogi National Gymnasium
September 3, 2022	Tokyo	Japan	Yoyogi National Gymnasium
September 4, 2022	Tokyo	Japan	Yoyogi National Gymnasium
September 10, 2022	Osaka	Japan	Osaka-jō Hall
September 11, 2022	Osaka	Japan	Osaka-jō Hall
September 17, 2022	Tokoname	Japan	Aichi Sky Expo
September 18, 2022	Tokoname	Japan	Aichi Sky Expo
October 4, 2022	Kobe	Japan	World Memorial Hall
October 5, 2022	Kobe	Japan	World Memorial Hall

=== NiziU Live With U 2022 "Burn It Up" ===
Date	City	Country	Venue
November 12, 2022	Tokyo	Japan	Tokyo Dome
November 13, 2022	Tokyo	Japan	Tokyo Dome
December 17, 2022	Osaka	Japan	Kyocera Dome Osaka; Beyond Live (Note: December 18 only.)
December 18, 2022	Osaka	Japan	Kyocera Dome Osaka; Beyond Live

=== NiziU Live With U 2023 "Coco! nut Fes." ===
Date	City	Country	Venue
July 1, 2023	Saga	Japan	Saga Arena
July 2, 2023	Saga	Japan	Saga Arena
July 5, 2023	Tokyo	Japan	Yoyogi National Gymnasium
July 6, 2023	Tokyo	Japan	Yoyogi National Gymnasium
July 8, 2023	Tokyo	Japan	Yoyogi National Gymnasium
July 9, 2023	Tokyo	Japan	Yoyogi National Gymnasium
July 19, 2023	Osaka	Japan	Osaka-jō Hall
July 20, 2023	Osaka	Japan	Osaka-jō Hall
August 9, 2023	Hiroshima	Japan	Hiroshima Green Arena
August 10, 2023	Hiroshima	Japan	Hiroshima Green Arena
August 19, 2023	Nagoya	Japan	Port Messe Nagoya
August 20, 2023	Nagoya	Japan	Port Messe Nagoya
August 23, 2023	Rifu	Japan	Sekisui Heim Super Arena
September 2, 2023	Sapporo	Japan	Hokkai Kitayell
September 3, 2023	Sapporo	Japan	Hokkai Kitayell
September 17, 2023	Chiba	Japan	Zozo Marine Stadium
September 18, 2023	Chiba	Japan	Zozo Marine Stadium

=== NiziU Live With U 2024–2025 "Awake" ===
Date	City	Country	Venue
November 23, 2024	Echizen	Japan	Sun Dome Fukui
November 24, 2024	Echizen	Japan	Sun Dome Fukui
November 30, 2024	Sapporo	Japan	Hokkai Kitayell
December 1, 2024	Sapporo	Japan	Hokkai Kitayell
December 21, 2024	Kobe	Japan	World Memorial Hall
December 22, 2024	Kobe	Japan	World Memorial Hall
January 8, 2025	Tokyo	Japan	Yoyogi National Gymnasium
January 9, 2025	Tokyo	Japan	Yoyogi National Gymnasium
January 11, 2025	Tokyo	Japan	Yoyogi National Gymnasium
January 12, 2025	Tokyo	Japan	Yoyogi National Gymnasium
January 21, 2025	Osaka	Japan	Osaka-jō Hall
January 22, 2025	Osaka	Japan	Osaka-jō Hall
February 8, 2025	Rifu	Japan	Sekisui Heim Super Arena
February 9, 2025	Rifu	Japan	Sekisui Heim Super Arena
February 15, 2025	Tokoname	Japan	Aichi Sky Expo
February 16, 2025	Tokoname	Japan	Aichi Sky Expo
February 22, 2025	Fukuoka	Japan	West Japan General Exhibition Center Annex
February 23, 2025	Fukuoka	Japan	West Japan General Exhibition Center Annex

== Filmography ==
=== Reality shows ===
Year	Title	Network	Note(s)	Ref.
2020	Nizi Project	Hulu Japan, Nippon TV, YouTube	Survival show determining NiziU's members. Broadcast period: Season 1: January 31, 2020 – March 27, 2020 (10 episodes), Season 2: April 24, 2020 – June 26, 2020 (10 episodes).	
2020	NiziU 9 Nizi Stories	Hulu Japan, Nippon TV	In exclusive interviews, NiziU members reflect on their experiences, express their ambitions, and discuss emotions they felt during Nizi Project and the time they spent living in South Korea. Premiered on September 13, 2020 (9 episodes).	
2020	We NiziU! ~We need U!~	Hulu Japan, Nippon TV, YouTube	Following the daily lives of NiziU members after Nizi Project, as they prepare for their official debut. Premiered on November 5, 2020 (5 episodes).	
2020	We NiziU! TV	Hulu Japan, Nippon TV	NiziU members are assigned "loose" missions and have to clear them. Premiered on December 6, 2020 (4 episodes).	
2021	NiziU Scout	YouTube	NiziU members will challenge various missions. Premiered on April 30, 2021 (10 episodes, 4 behind episodes).	
2021	We NiziU! TV 2	Hulu Japan, Nippon TV	Premiered on November 28, 2021 (4 episodes).	
2022	NiziU School	YouTube	NiziU School is set in a school class that "boasts a special curriculum than any other school", with help from 5 unique teachers.	

== Videography ==
=== Music videos ===
Year	Music video	Director(s)	Ref.
2020	"Make You Happy"	Kim Young-jo, Yoo Seung-woo (Naive Creative Production)	
2020	"Step and a Step"	Naive Creative Production	
2021	"Take a Picture"	Naive Creative Production	
2021	"Poppin' Shakin'"	Naive Creative Production	
2021	"Chopstick"	Naive Creative Production	
2021	"Need U"	Jimmy (VIA)	
2021	"Take a Picture" (English ver.)	Naive Creative Production	
2021	"Poppin' Shakin'" (English ver.)	Naive Creative Production	
2021	"Chopstick" (Another ver.)	Naive Creative Production	
2022	"Asobo"	SL8IGHT Visual Lab	
2022	"Asobo (English ver.)"	SL8IGHT Visual Lab	
2022	"Clap Clap"	Naive Creative Production	
2022	"Blue Moon"	Jeong Jin-su, Kim Hye-won (Visuals From)	
2023	"Paradise"	Naive Creative Production	
2023	"Coconut"	Sunny Visual	
2023	"Heartris"	Lee Hye-su, Hong Jae-hwan (Swisher Film)	
2024	"Sweet Nonfiction"	Lee Hye-su, Hong Jae-hwan (Swisher Film)	
2024	"Rise Up"	Seong Won-mo (Digipedi)	
2024	"AlwayS"	Lee Jeongyeon	
2025	"Yoake"	Guzza (Kudo)	
2025	"Love Line"	Lee Hyesu, Hong Jaehwan (Swisher Film)	
2025	"Love Emotion"	Seong (Digipedi)	
2026	"Dear …"	Soze (Studio Gaze)	
2026	"Too Bad"	Soze (Studio Gaze)	
2026	"Sour Grapes"	Lee Jeongyeon	

=== Video albums ===
List of video albums, with selected details, chart positions and sales
Title	Details	Peak chart positions	Sales
Title	Details	JPN Blu-ray	Sales
NiziU Live with U 2022 "Burn it Up" in Tokyo Dome	Released: May 10, 2023; Label: Epic Japan; Format: Blu-ray	1	JPN: 33,673
NiziU Live with U 2023 "COCO! nut Fes." -Stadium Special- in ZOZO Marine Stadium	Released: May 1, 2024; Label: Epic Japan; Format: Blu-ray	3	JPN: 19,782
NiziU Live with U 2024–2025 "Awake"	Released: August 20, 2025; Label: Epic Japan; Format: Blu-ray	3	JPN: 14,463

== Awards and nominations ==
Name of the award ceremony, year presented, award category, nominee(s) of the award, and the result of the nomination
Award ceremony	Year	Category	Nominee(s)/work(s)	Result	Ref.
Asia Artist Awards	2021	Female Idol Group Popularity Award	NiziU	Nominated	
Asia Artist Awards	2022	Hot Trend Award – Singer	NiziU	Won	
Asia Artist Awards	2025	Popularity Award – Group	NiziU	Won	
Asia Star Entertainer Awards	2024	The Best Group	NiziU	Won	
Asia Star Entertainer Awards	2024	The Best Star (Japan)	NiziU	Won	
Asia Star Entertainer Awards	2025	The Best Group	NiziU	Won	
CD Shop Awards	2021	Prize Awards	U	Won	
Circle Chart Music Awards	2024	New Artist of the Next Generation	NiziU	Won	
Circle Chart Music Awards	2024	Mubeat Global Choice – Female	NiziU	Won	
Japan Gold Disc Award	2021	Best 5 New Artist	NiziU	Won	
Japan Gold Disc Award	2021	Best 5 Songs by Download	"Make You Happy"	Won	
Japan Gold Disc Award	2021	Best 5 Songs by Streaming	"Make You Happy"	Won	
Japan Record Awards	2020	Special Achievement Award	NiziU	Won	
Japan Record Awards	2021	Excellent Work Award	"Take a Picture"	Won	
Japan Record Awards	2022	Excellent Work Award	"Clap Clap"	Won	
K-Star MVA (Note: A Japan-Korea joint project held by "IDOL CHAMP," a global support app for KPOP idols, which awards the "Best Artist" who is most supported by global K-Pop fans and the "Next Star" who will carry the future of K-Pop.)	2023	Best Artist – Women	NiziU	Won	
MTV Video Music Awards Japan	2020	Best Dance Video	"Make You Happy"	Won	
MTV Video Music Awards Japan	2021	Best Buzz Award	NiziU	Won	
MTV Video Music Awards Japan	2023	Best Pop Video	"Paradise"	Won	
Music Awards Japan	2025	Best of Listeners' Choice: Japanese Song	"Sweet Nonfiction"	Nominated	
Music Awards Japan	2025	Best Idol Artist/Group	NiziU	Nominated	
Music Awards Japan	2025	Special Award: Oshi-Katsu Request Artist of the Year	NiziU	Nominated	
Universal Superstar Awards	2024	Universal Next Generation (Female)	NiziU	Won	
Vogue Japan Women of the Year	2020	Idol Category Award	NiziU	Won	
We Push! Yamano CD Music Award	2022	Special Award	U	Won	
Yahoo! Japan Search Awards	2020	Idol Category Award	NiziU	Won	
