= Hito wa Yume o Nido Miru =

- Regular edition cover

Single by Nogizaka46

from the album My Respect
- Language: Japanese
- B-side: "Bokutachi no Sayonara"; "Kokoro ni mo Nai Koto" (Type-A); "Tasogare wa Itsu mo" (Type-B); "Never Say Never" (Type-C); "Sazanami wa Modoranai" (Type-D); "Namida no Suberidai" (regular)
- Released: March 28, 2023
- Genre: J-pop
- Length: 5:43
- Label: N46Div.; Sony Japan
- Composer: Kazuma Matsuo
- Lyricist: Yasushi Akimoto
- Producer: Yasushi Akimoto

Nogizaka46 singles chronology
"Koko ni wa Nai Mono" (2022)	"Hito wa Yume o Nido Miru" (2023)	"Ohitorisama Tengoku" (2023)

Music video
- "Hito wa Yume o Nido Miru" on YouTube

"Hito wa Yume o Nido Miru" (人は夢を二度見る; lit. "People Dream Twice") is a song recorded by Japanese idol group Nogizaka46. It was released as the group's thirty-second single on March 28, 2023, through N46Div. and Sony Music Records. Third-generation members Mizuki Yamashita and Shiori Kubo serve as center positions of the performance. The single debuted atop the Oricon Singles Chart with over 516,000 first-week sales.

== Background and release ==
On February 13, 2023, Nogizaka46 announced their thirty-second single via their variety show Nogizaka Under Construction, would be released on March 22. Five days later, the group surprise-released the last first-generation member Manatsu Akimoto's graduation song "Bokutachi no Sayonara", sung by all members including Akimoto as the lead singer. The song will later be included in the upcoming single. On February 18, Ayane Suzuki, the last second-generation, announced graduation (leaving) from the group via her official blog, stated that she would not participate in any 32nd single activity.

The senbatsu members were announced on February 20 through their variety show, consisting of 20 members, of which 11 members are fukujin. Third-generation members Mizuki Yamashita and Shiori Kubo would serve as the center position of the single; the second time for Yamashita since the 26th single "Boku wa Boku o Suki ni Naru", and the first time for Kubo. The fourth-generation Rika Satō and Miyu Matsuo, and the fifth-generation Mao Ioki, Miku Ichinose, Nagi Inoue, Sakura Kawasaki, and Satsuki Sugawara were also included to the senbatsu members for the first time.

The group's annual concert 11th Year Birthday Live was held between February 22 to 25, 2023. On the second day, the fifth-generation members revealed and performed their new song "Kokoro ni mo Nai Koto". On February 28, the group delayed by a week, on March 28, due to production problems. The title "Hito wa Yume o Nido Miru" was announced on March 6, and the B-sides the next day. On March 9, the full song was played for the first time on the radio show Nogizaka46 no All Night Nippon. Five cover artworks for each edition also revealed on the same day. Photographed by Hiroshi Manaka and art directed by Koji Wagatsuma, they show the members with various objects wrapped in colorful cloth in an art warehouse, representing Nogizaka46's unseen and new appearance that will be shown in the future.

== Music video ==
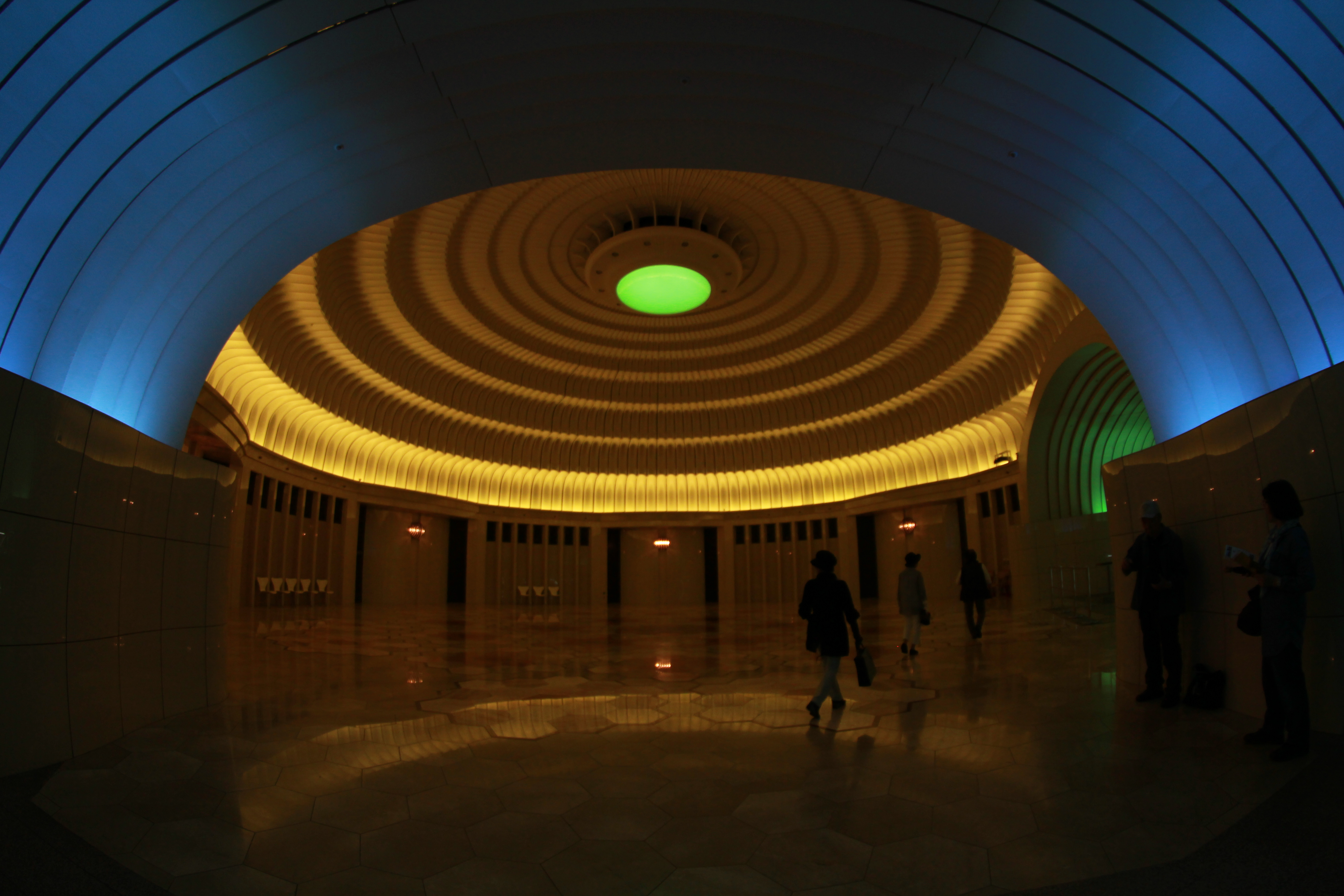
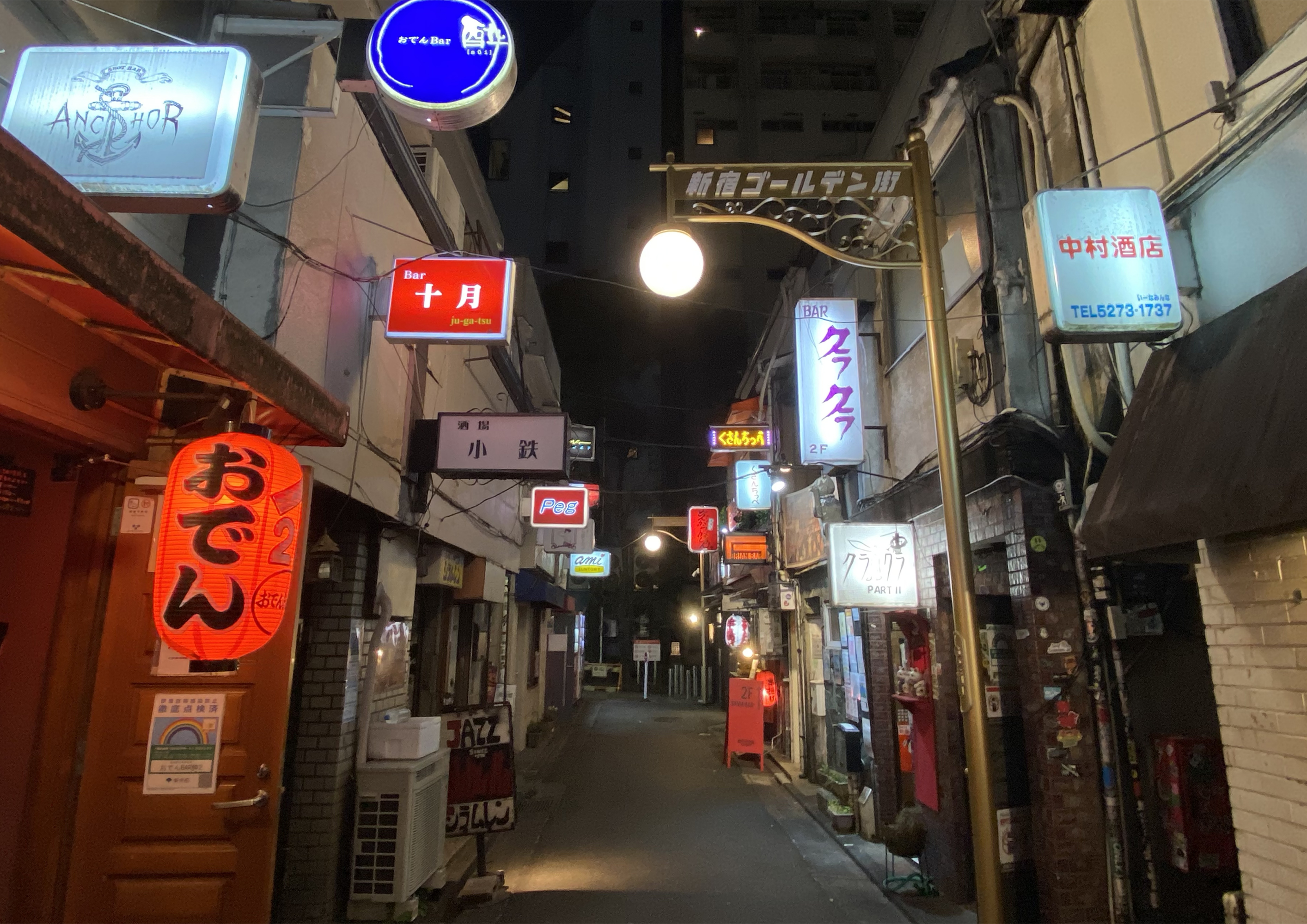
The music video for "Hito wa Yume o Nido Miru" was shot at MOA Museum of Art (top) and Shinjuku Golden Gai (bottom)

An official music video for "Hito wa Yume o Nido Miru" premiered on March 22, 2023. It was shot from late February to March at MOA Museum of Art, Shinjuku Golden Gai, and a studio in Tokyo, and directed by Takeshi Maruyama. The music video depicts the theme of "people who have lost their dreams meet someone and become friends so that they can have hope and enjoyment in the future."

=== B-sides ===
A music video for "Sazanami wa Modoranai", served the center position by Ririka Itō and Runa Hayashi, was released on March 12, 2023. Yoshiharu Seri directed the music video, showing the members' relationship with the concept of a circle. "Kokoro ni mo Nai Koto" music video came on March 17. Teresa Ikeda served as the center position. Directed by Atsunori Tōshi, it depicts a fusion of everyday life and art, such as Jean Prouvé and Isamu Noguchi's work.

== Commercial performance ==
"Hito wa Yume o Nido Miru" debuted at number one on the Oricon Singles Chart dated April 10, 2023, becoming Nogizaka46's 31st consecutive number-one single since "Oide Shampoo" (2012), and the second most number-one single by a female artist, behind AKB48. The single sold 516,884 CD copies in its first week, marking it the biggest sales week by a female act in 2023, and the first female artist to sell over 500,000 in a single week in the year. The single also debuted atop the Oricon Combined Singles Chart. It marked Nogizaka46 most number one on the chart with ten singles, alongside King & Prince.

For Billboard Japan, "Hito wa Yume o Nido Miru" initially debuted at number 56 on the Japan Hot 100 dated April 5, 2023 with 6,082 downloads, before ascended to number two next week, behind only Treasure's "Here I Stand". The CD single sold 609,458 physical copies on the first day, and totally 663,277 copies in its first week. Recording Industry Association of Japan (RIAJ) certified triple platinum for physical release on April 10.

== Live performances ==
Nogizaka46 debuted "Hito wa Yume o Nido Miru" performance at Venue101 on March 18, 2023, as well as two-hour special CDTV Live! Live! on March 20, Utacon on April 4, alongside "Kimi no Na wa Kibō", and Music Station on April 7.

== Track listing ==
All lyrics are written by Yasushi Akimoto, except the off-vocal tracks.

Limited Type-A – CD
No.	Title	Music	Arrangement	Length
1.	"Hito wa Yume o Nido Miru" (人は夢を二度見る; senbatsu members)	Kazuma Matsuo	Apazzi	5:43
2.	"Bokutachi no Sayonara" (僕たちのサヨナラ; Manatsu Akimoto and all members)	Eiji Kawai	Kawai	4:03
3.	"Kokoro ni mo Nai Koto" (心にもないこと; fifth-generation members)	Katsuhiko Sugiyama	Sugiyama; Tsuyoshi Ishihara	4:03
4.	"Hito wa Yume o Nido Miru" (off vocal version)			5:43
5.	"Bokutachi no Sayonara" (off vocal version)			4:03
6.	"Kokoro ni mo Nai Koto" (off vocal version)			4:01
Total length:				27:36

Limited Type-A: Fifth-generation individual PV – Blu-ray
No.	Title	Director(s)	Length
1.	"Mao Ioki: Ioki Phase7" (五百城茉央「いおき PHASE7」)	Yūsuke Koroyasu
2.	"Teresa Ikeda: Duel" (池田瑛紗「デュエル」)	Katsuki Ishii
3.	"Miku Ishinose: Mīkyun, Kyun" (一ノ瀬美空「みーきゅん、キュン」)	Yukiko Matsuo
4.	"Nagi Inoue: One Day Session 001" (井上和「One Day Session 001」)	Atsunori Tōshi
Total length:			20:02

Limited Type-B – CD
No.	Title	Music	Arrangement	Length
1.	"Hito wa Yume o Nido Miru"			5:43
2.	"Bokutachi no Sayonara"			4:03
3.	"Tasogare wa Itsu mo" (黄昏はいつも; Sakura Endō and Nagi Inoue)	Jun Watanabe	Watanabe	4:15
4.	"Hito wa Yume o Nido Miru" (off vocal version)			5:43
5.	"Bokutachi no Sayonara" (off vocal version)			4:03
6.	"Tasogare wa Itsu mo" (off vocal version)			4:14
Total length:				28:01

Limited Type-B: Fifth-generation individual PV – Blu-ray
No.	Title	Director(s)	Length
1.	"Hina Okamoto: Boku wa Ima mo," (岡本姫奈「僕は今を、」)	Momoko Ishida
2.	"Aya Ogawa: Aya wa, Tada Te o Tsunagitai Dake" (小川彩「彩は、ただ手をつなぎたいだけ)	Daisaku Fujino
3.	"Iroha Okuda: Kikkake" (奥田いろは「きっかけ」)	Kanchi Takano
4.	"Sakura Kawasaki: Sakura One Cut" (川﨑桜「SAKURA ONE CUT」)	Tsukita Shigeru
Total length:			19:02

Limited Type-C – CD
No.	Title	Music	Arrangement	Length
1.	"Hito wa Yume o Nido Miru"			5:43
2.	"Bokutachi no Sayonara"			4:03
3.	"Never Say Never" (Shiori Kubo, Hazuki Mukai, Saya Kanagawa, Haruka Kuromi, Yuna Shibata)	Nazca	The Third	3:21
4.	"Hito wa Yume o Nido Miru" (off vocal version)			5:43
5.	"Bokutachi no Sayonara" (off vocal version)			4:03
6.	"Never Say Never" (off vocal version)			3:20
Total length:				26:13

Limited Type-C: Fifth-generation individual PV – Blu-ray
No.	Title	Director(s)	Length
1.	"Satsuki Sugawara: Nani mo Shiranai Kuse ni (LOL)" (菅原咲月「何も知らないくせに（笑）」)	Nozomi Ueda
2.	"Nao Tomisato: My Rabbit Jump" (冨里奈央「My Rabbit Jump」)	Takurō Ōkubo
3.	"Aruno Nakanishi: No More! Eiga Aruno" (中西アルノ「NO MORE! 映画アルノ」)	Shūto Itō
Total length:			16:01

Limited Type-D – CD
No.	Title	Music	Arrangement	Length
1.	"Hito wa Yume o Nido Miru"			5:43
2.	"Bokutachi no Sayonara"			4:03
3.	"Sazanami wa Modoranai" (さざ波は戻らない; under members)	Shintaro Itō	Apazzi	4:07
4.	"Hito wa Yume o Nido Miru" (off vocal version)			5:43
5.	"Bokutachi no Sayonara" (off vocal version)			4:03
6.	"Sazanami wa Modoranai" (off vocal version)			4:06
Total length:				27:45

Limited Type-D: 31st Single Under Live – Blu-ray
No.	Title	Length
1.	"Under"
2.	"Ashita ga Aru Riyū"
3.	"Todokanakutatte..."
4.	"Warui Seibun"
5.	"Before&After of Under Live"
Total length:		31:01

Regular – CD
No.	Title	Music	Arrangement	Length
1.	"Hito wa Yume o Nido Miru"			5:43
2.	"Bokutachi no Sayonara"			4:03
3.	"Namida no Suberidai" (涙の滑り台; Renka Iwamoto, Ayame Tsutsui, Aya Ogawa)	3grass; Takashi Fukuda	Fukuda	3:47
4.	"Hito wa Yume o Nido Miru" (off vocal version)			5:43
5.	"Bokutachi no Sayonara" (off vocal version)			4:03
6.	"Namida no Suberidai" (off vocal version)			3:46
Total length:				27:08

Special edition – digital download, streaming
No.	Title	Length
1.	"Hito wa Yume o Nido Miru"	5:43
2.	"Bokutachi no Sayonara"	4:03
3.	"Kokoro ni mo Nai Koto"	4:03
4.	"Tasogare wa Itsu mo"	4:15
5.	"Never Say Never"	3:21
6.	"Sazanami wa Modoranai"	4:07
7.	"Namida no Suberidai"	3:48
Total length:		29:20

== Participating members ==
- Third row: Rika Satō, Saya Kanagawa, Seira Hayakawa, Miku Ichinose, Miyu Matsuo, Mao Ioki, Renka Iwamoto, Nao Yumiki, Yuna Shibata
- Second row: Satsuki Sugawara, Mayu Tamura, Yūki Yoda, Nagi Inoue, Minami Umezawa, Ayane Suzuki, Sakura Kawasaki
- First row: Haruka Kaki, Shiori Kubo (center), Mizuki Yamashita (center), Sakura Endō

== Charts ==
=== Weekly charts ===
Weekly chart performance for "Hito wa Yume o Nido Miru"
Chart (2023)	Peak position
Japan (Japan Hot 100)	2
Japan (Oricon)	1
Japan Combined Singles (Oricon)	1
Japanese Combined Albums (Oricon)	21

=== Monthly charts ===
Monthly chart performance for "Hito wa Yume o Nido Miru"
Chart (2023)	Position
Japan (Oricon)	3

=== Year-end charts ===
Year-end chart performance for "Hito wa Yume o Nido Miru"
Chart (2023)	Position
Japan Top Singles Sales (Billboard Japan)	6
Japan (Oricon)	5

== Certifications ==
Sales certifications for "Hito wa Yume o Nido Miru"
Region	Certification	Certified units/sales
Japan (RIAJ)	3× Platinum	750,000^{^}
^{^} Shipments figures based on certification alone.

== Release history ==
Release dates and formats for "Hito wa Yume o Nido Miru"
Region	Date	Format	Version	Label	Ref.
Various	March 22, 2023	Digital download; streaming	Special	N46Div.; Sony Japan	
Japan	March 28, 2023	CD+Blu-ray	Type-A; Type-B; Type-C; Type-D	N46Div.; Sony Japan	
Japan	March 28, 2023	CD	Regular	N46Div.; Sony Japan	

== See also ==
- List of Oricon number-one singles of 2023
