= Sakura Kawasaki =

Japanese singer, model, and actress (born 2003)

- 川﨑 桜
- Kawasaki in 2024
- Born: April 17, 2003 (age 23); Kanagawa Prefecture, Japan
- Education: Rikkyo University (Faculty of Letters)
- Occupations: Singer; model; actress
- Years active: 2022–present
- Agent: Nogizaka.LLC
- Height: 155 cm (5 ft 1 in)
- Musical career
- Genre: J-pop
- Instruments: Vocals
- Label: Sony Music
- Member of: Nogizaka46

Sakura Kawasaki (Japanese: 川﨑 桜, Hepburn: Kawasaki Sakura; born April 17, 2003), is a Japanese singer, model and actress. She is a fifth-generation member of the idol girl group Nogizaka46 and exclusive model for the fashion magazine CanCam.

== Early life and education ==
Kawasaki was born on April 17, 2003, in Kanagawa Prefecture. She has an older brother and a younger sister. Before joining Nogizaka46 and becoming a singer, she was a figure skater. Having practiced the sport for over 10 years, from elementary school through high school, she also competed briefly at the professional level.

On March 24, 2026, she announced that she had graduated from Rikkyo University, Faculty of Letters, Department of Literature, majoring in English and American Literature.

== Career ==
Kawasaki was revealed as one of the 11 new Nogizaka46 fifth-generation members on February 9, 2022. Shortly after joining the group, she became the center for the fifth-generation song "17 Funkan" included in the thirty-first single "Koko ni wa Nai Mono," which was released on December 7.

Aside from her work with the group, Kawasaki is also an ambassador for figure skating. She was appointed by Fuji Television on March 2023, as the "World Figure Skating Special Supporter" for the 2023 World Figure Skating Championships. On the 22nd of the same month, she performed to Nogizaka46’s song "Synchronicity" at the competition’s ice-skating opening ceremony, together with competition ambassadors Keiji Tanaka and Satoko Miyahara. Then on the 29th of March, Kawasaki was selected for the first time as a Fukujin (福神; lit. 'Deities of Good Luck'), members who are selected to stand in the first two rows of the lineup, to perform live in the thirty-second single, "Hito wa Yume wo Nido Miru". Then on October 1 of the same year, she became the regular MC for the first, third, and fifth Sundays of the radio program Rajira!. Later that year in November, it was announced that she would serve as the "Special Supporter" in charge of all of Fuji Television's figure‑skating broadcasts for the season.

In April 2024, she starred alongside fellow Nogizaka46 fifth‑generation members in their debut musical, Pretty Guardian Sailor Moon. Kawasaki has also appeared in two SoftBank TV commercials opposite actor Ryota Bando, which began airing on July 17, 2025. She was selected again as a performing front member for the thirty-nineth single, "Same Numbers," which was released in July 30. In October 1 of the same year, she made her voice acting debut as an aspiring idol character, Sakunyan, in the NHK Educational TV anime series Hanakappa from October 2025 to February 2026. Later on October 18, she made her runway debut at the fashion event "Rakuten GirlsAward 2025 Autumn/Winter".

Kawasaki for the Consumer Hotline commercial in 2025.

Her first photo book, entitled Etude, was photographed in France, and published by Shinchosha on April 14, 2026. It sold 77,197 copies in its first week placing first in the photobook category of the Oricon Weekly Book Ranking. It also placed first in the photobook category of the Oricon 2026 Half-year Book Rankings with 92,000 copies during the period.

On June 12, 2026, she made her acting debut as the protagonist in the vertical web drama Baseball Girl Washio, marking her first lead role in a drama. The series was streamed on Fod Short. On September 15 of the same year, it was announced that Kawasaki had signed as an exclusive model for the women's fashion magazine CanCam. A month later in October 15, she co-hosted the "2026/2027 Season Figure Skating Press Conference" with former professional tennis player Shuzo Matsuoka.

== Filmography ==
=== Television ===
Year	Title	Role	Notes	Ref.
2023	The Tale of the Old Bookstore	Akane Takimoto	Anthology series; episodes 1–2	
2024	The Supernatural Sweet Shop	Cameo (voice)	Episode 112	
2025–26	Hanakappa	Sakunyan (voice)	TV anime; episodes 729, 731, 734, 737, and 740	
2026	Baseball Girl Washio	Shiho Washio	Lead role	

== Stage ==
=== Theater ===
Year	Title	Role	Notes	Ref.
2024	Pretty Guardian Sailor Moon	Minako Aino		

== Bibliography ==
=== Magazine ===
- CanCam (September 24, 2025, Shinchosha) – exclusive model

=== Photobook ===
- Etude (April 14, 2026, Shinchosha)
