= My Respect =

- Digital and standard cover

Studio album by Nogizaka46
- Released: January 14, 2026
- Genre: J-pop
- Length: 190:49
- Language: Japanese
- Label: N46Div.; Sony Music
- Producer: Yasushi Akimoto

Nogizaka46 chronology
Time Flies (2021)	My Respect (2026)

Singles from My Respect
- 1. "Actually..." Released: March 23, 2022; 2. "Suki to Iu no wa Rock da ze!" Released: August 31, 2022; 3. "Koko ni wa Nai Mono" Released: December 7, 2022; 4. "Hito wa Yume o Nido Miru" Released: March 29, 2023; 5. "Ohitorisama Tengoku" Released: August 23, 2023; 6. "Monopoly" Released: December 6, 2023; 7. "Chance wa Byōdō" Released: April 10, 2024; 8. "Cheat Day" Released: August 21, 2024; 9. "Hodōkyō" Released: December 11, 2024; 10. "Navel Orange" Released: March 26, 2025; 11. "Same Numbers" Released: July 30, 2025; 12. "Biryani" Released: November 26, 2025

My Respect is the fifth studio album by Japanese girl group Nogizaka46. It was released through N46Div. and Sony Music Records on January 14, 2026. The album is a follow-up to the group's greatest hits album Time Flies (2021) and the first studio album in seven years since Ima ga Omoide ni Naru made (2019).

Twelve number-one singles on the Oricon Singles Chart preceded My Respect–"Actually...", "Suki to Iu no wa Rock da ze!", "Koko ni wa Nai Mono", "Hito wa Yume o Nido Miru", "Ohitorisama Tengoku", "Monopoly", "Chance wa Byōdō", "Cheat Day", "Hodōkyō", "Navel Orange", "Same Numbers", and "Biryani", as well as the title track as a promotional single. Commercially, the album topped the Oricon Albums Chart and the Billboard Japan Hot Albums, and was certified platinum by the Recording Industry Association of Japan (RIAJ).

== Background and release ==
On November 6, 2025, during the livestream Nogizaka Under Construction 10th Anniversary Live Stream 3-Hour SP on the YouTube channel Nogizaka Streaming Now, Nogizaka46 member and caption Minami Umezawa announced the group's fifth studio album, titled My Respect. It is the first studio album in seven years since Ima ga Omoide ni Naru made (2019). The album consists of the group's twelve singles from "Actually..." in 2022 to the most recent "Biryani" in November 2025, as well as new tracks.

The physical CD comes in four editions: the first press limited Type-A, Type-B, and Type-C feature bonus tracks by the group's third, fourth, and fifth-generation members, respectively, and the complete limited edition containing all tracks from each first press limited edition. The Blu-ray includes footage from the group's Midsummer National Tour 2025 at Meiji Jingu Stadium. Cover artworks depict the theme of "A Feast of Melodies" and feature colorful and unique dishes beautifully arranged on the table, designed by Koji Wagatsuma (VAR).

== Promotion ==
Prior to the release, Nogizaka46 performed "Same Numbers" at Best Artist 2025 on November 29, 2025, CDTV Live! Live! Christmas Love Song Fes. on December 15, the 67th Japan Record Awards on December 30, and the 76th Kōhaku Uta Gassen the next day; "Navel Orange" at Music Station Super Live 2025 on December 26; and "Biryani" at CDTV Live! Live! New Year's Eve Countdown Fes. 2025–2026 on January 1, 2026.

The title track, "My Respect", was released as the album's only promotional single on January 7, 2026, a week before the album release. The song represents the "now" of Nogizaka46 and features in the group's New Year's special commercial. The album's snippet video was uploaded on January 9. The group performed "Cheat Day" and "Monopoly" at Buzz Rhythm 02 on January 16; and "Ohitorisama Tengoku" and "Biryani" at With Music on January 24. In support of My Respect, Nogizaka46 held the Coupling Collection 2022–2025 from February 20 to 21 and the My Respect Memorial Live from February 22 to 23, 2026, at Ariake Arena, Tokyo, where the latter the group debuted all new tracks.

== Commercial performance ==
My Respect debuted at number one on the Oricon Albums Chart and the Combined Albums Chart with 192,512 copies, becoming Nogizaka46's seventh consecutive number-one album on the former since their debut Tōmei na Iro (2015), the first girl group to do so. On Billboard Japan charts, the album reached number one on the Hot Albums, selling 223,992 copies and 1,139 downloads. The album also topped the Top Albums Sales and Download Albums. My Respect received platinum certification for 250,000 shipments from the Recording Industry Association of Japan (RIAJ).

== Track listing ==
All lyrics are written by Yasushi Akimoto.

My Respect standard track listing
No.	Title	Music	Arrangement	Length
1.	"Actually..."	Namito	Apazzi	3:40
2.	"Suki to Iu no wa Rock da ze!" (好きというのはロックだぜ!)	Yōichirō Nomura	Nomura	5:32
3.	"Koko ni wa Nai Mono" (ここにはないもの)	Nazca	The Third	5:11
4.	"Hito wa Yume o Nido Miru" (人は夢を二度見る)	Kazuma Matsuo	Apazzi	5:43
5.	"Ohitorisama Tengoku" (おひとりさま天国)	Akira Sunset; Manabu Marutani; Ha-J; Naoki Endo	Apazzi	4:15
6.	"Monopoly"	Katsuhiko Sugiyama	Sugiyama; Manabu Yachi; Haruto Onoe	3:58
7.	"Chance wa Byōdō" (チャンスは平等)	Daisuke Nakamura	Nakamura	4:13
8.	"Cheat Day" (チートデイ)	Masahiro Kawaura	Nonaka "Masa" Yuichi	4:30
9.	"Hodōkyō" (歩道橋)	Sugiyama	Sugiyama; Ishihara Tsuyoshi; Yūta Asao	5:06
10.	"Navel Orange" (ネーブルオレンジ)	Nakamura	Nobuhiko Kashiwara	5:32
11.	"Same Numbers"	Kawaura	Kashiwara	5:05
12.	"Biryani" (ビリヤニ)	Lee Lab	Satoshi Hanamura	4:38
13.	"My Respect"	Uto; Kazuma Kawata; Onoe	Kawata; Onoe	5:08
14.	"Zenryoku Lap Time" (全力ラップタイム)	Iwano Koh; Yuya Ishiguchi	Ishiguchi	4:24
Total length:				66:59

My Respect – complete limited disc 2 / first press limited type-A (CD)
No.	Title	Music	Arrangement	Length
1.	"Sanbanme no Kaze" (三番目の風)	Marutani	Marutani	5:07
2.	"Omoide First" (思い出ファースト)	Misamasakario	Naoki Endō	4:12
3.	"Mirai no Kotae" (未来の答え)	Yūsuke Itagaki	Itagaki	5:25
4.	"Boku no Shōdō" (僕の衝動)	Nobutaka Ishii	Ishii	4:14
5.	"Tokitokimekimeki" (トキトキメキメキ)	Satoshi Nakayama; Masaru Adachi	Nakayama; Adachi	4:00
6.	"Jibun Ja Nai Kanji" (自分じゃない感じ)	Tadashi Tsukida	Tsukida	4:08
7.	"Mainichi ga Brand New Day" (毎日がBrand new day)	Apazzi	Apazzi	4:19
8.	"Otonatachi ni wa Shiji Sarenai" (大人たちには指示されない)	Basemint	Basemint	4:12
9.	"Boku ga Te o Tataku Hō e" (僕が手を叩く方へ)	Fujiya Ichirō	Ichirō	4:35
10.	"Sekai wa Koko ni Aru" (世界はここにある)	Masaharu Tsuruku	Taishi Noguchi	4:45
Total length:				44:57

My Respect – first press limited type-A (Blu-ray): Midsummer National Tour 2025 Final in Meiji Jingu Stadium Day 1 Special Selections
No.	Title	Length
1.	"Kimi to Neko" (君と猫)
2.	"Kimi wa Boku to Awanai Hō ga Yokatta no ka na" (君は僕と会わない方がよかったのかな)
3.	"Sonna Baka na..." (そんなバカな...)
4.	"Mukuchi na Lion" (無口なライオン)
5.	"Sukima" (隙間)
6.	"Boku no Koto, Shitteru" (僕のこと、知ってる?)
7.	"Sing Out!"
8.	"Sanbanme no Kaze"
Total length:		30:04

My Respect – complete limited disc 3 / first press limited type-B (CD)
No.	Title	Music	Arrangement	Length
1.	"Kiss no Shuriken" (キスの手裏剣)	Tomokazu Yamada	Shōhei Sumiya	4:21
2.	"4 Banme no Hikari" (4番目の光)	Sugiyama	Sugiyama; Yachi	4:12
3.	"Toshoshitsu no Kimi e" (図書室の君へ)	Sugiyama	Makoto Wakatabe	4:01
4.	"I See..."	Youth Case	Hirofumi Sasaki	4:14
5.	"Out of the Blue"	Youth Case	Tomoki Ishizuka	4:32
6.	"Nekojita Camomile Tea" (猫舌カモミールティー)	Shinobu Suzuki	Suzuki	4:03
7.	"Jumping Joker Flash" (ジャンピングジョーカーフラッシュ)	Kuboty	Kuboty	4:00
8.	"Fake Doctor"	Mizuki Kamada	Kamada	3:12
Total length:				32:35

My Respect – first press limited type-B (Blu-ray): Midsummer National Tour 2025 Final in Meiji Jingu Stadium Day 2 Special Selections
No.	Title	Length
1.	"Kimi no Na wa Kibō" (君の名は希望)
2.	"Sabita Compass" (錆びたコンパス)
3.	"Kakumei no Uma" (革命の馬)
4.	"Anna ni Suki datta no ni..." (あんなに好きだったのに...)
5.	"Bokutachi no Sayonara" (僕たちのサヨナラ)
6.	"Yuki ga Furu Hi ni Mata Aō" (雪が降る日にまた会おう)
7.	"Boku ga Iru Basho" (僕がいる場所)
8.	"Never Say Never"
Total length:		24:45

My Respect – complete limited disc 4 / first press limited type-C (CD)
No.	Title	Music	Arrangement	Length
1.	"Zetsubō no Ichi-byō Mae" (絶望の一秒前)	Tsukida	Wakatabe	4:59
2.	"Band-Aid Hagasu Yō na Wakarekata" (バンドエイド剥がすような別れ方)	A-Note; S-Tone	A-Note; S-Tone	4:49
3.	"17 Funkan" (17分間)	Hiroyuki Himeno	Apazzi	5:32
4.	"Kokoro ni mo Nai Moto" (心にもないこと)	Sugiyama	Sugiyama; Ishihara Tsuyoshi	4:03
5.	"Kangae Nai Yō ni Suru" (考えないようにする)	Sugiyama	Sugiyama; Yachi	4:49
6.	"Itsu no Hi ni ka, Ano Uta o..." (いつの日にか、あの歌を...)	Matsuo Kazuma	Kazuma	4:33
7.	"'Jāne' ga Setsunai" (「じゃあね」が切ない)	Yuya Fujinaka	Fujinaka	5:10
8.	"Nekkyō no Hakeguchi" (熱狂の捌け口)	Fukuta Takanori	Naohiko Tsuta	3:45
9.	"Sōtaisei Riron ni Igi o Tonaeru" (相対性理論に異議を唱える)	Nazca	Mellow	5:24
10.	"Just a Sec."	Nazca	Stella	3:35
Total length:				46:39

My Respect – first press limited type-C (Blu-ray): Midsummer National Tour 2025 Final in Meiji Jingu Stadium Day 3 Special Selections
No.	Title	Length
1.	"Inochi wa Utsukushii" (命は美しい)
2.	"Kimi wa Boku to Awanai Hō ga Yokatta no ka na"
3.	"Gomen ne, Smoothie" (ごめんね、スムージー)
4.	"Against"
5.	"Ikuate no Nai Bokutachi" (行くあてのない僕たち)
6.	"Chopin no Usotsuki" (ショパンの嘘つき)
7.	"Kanashima no Wasurekata" (悲しみの忘れ方)
8.	"Band-Aid Hagasu Yō na Wakarekata"
Total length:		31:05

My Respect – complete limited (Blu-ray): Midsummer National Tour 2025 Final in Meiji Jingu Stadium Day 4
No.	Title	Length
1.	"Overture"
2.	"Kimi ni Shikarareta" (君に叱られた)
3.	"Jikochū de Ikō!" (ジコチューで行こう!)
4.	"Hadashi de Summer" (裸足でSummer)
5.	"Girls' Rule" (ガールズルール)
6.	"Suki to Iu no wa Rock da ze!"
7.	"Navel Orange"
8.	"Naze Bokutachi wa Hashiru no ka?" (なぜ 僕たちは走るのか?)
9.	"Tteka sa" (ってかさ)
10.	"Fudōtoku na Natsu" (不道徳な夏)
11.	"Kimi no Na wa Kibō"
12.	"Sabita Compass"
13.	"Botchi Tō" (ぼっち党)
14.	"Anna ni Suki datta no ni..."
15.	"Border" (ボーダー)
16.	"Gomen ne Fingers Crossed" (ごめんねFingers crossed)
17.	"Hitonatsu no Nagasa yori" (ひと夏の長さより...)
18.	"Sing Out!"
19.	"Manatsubi yo" (真夏日よ)
20.	"Monopoly"
21.	"Arigachi na Ren'ai" (ありがちな恋愛)
22.	"Seifuku no Mannequin" (制服のマネキン)
23.	"Actually..."
24.	"Natsu no Free & Easy" (夏のFree&Easy)
25.	"Ohitorisama Tengoku"
26.	"I See..."
27.	"Same Numbers"
28.	"Cheat Day"
29.	"Tanin no Sora Ni" (他人のそら似)
30.	"Jumping Joker Flash"
31.	"Nogizaka no Uta" (乃木坂の詩)
32.	"Kimi ni Shikarareta"
Total length:		162:54

== Charts ==
=== Weekly charts ===
Weekly chart performance for My Respect
Chart (2026)	Peak position
Japanese Albums (Oricon)	1
Japanese Combined Albums (Oricon)	1
Japanese Hot Albums (Billboard Japan)	1

=== Monthly charts ===
Monthly chart performance for My Respect
Chart (2026)	Position
Japanese Albums (Oricon)	3

== Certifications ==
Certifications for My Respect
Region	Certification	Certified units/sales
Japan (RIAJ)	Platinum	250,000^{^}
^{^} Shipments figures based on certification alone.

== Release history ==
Release dates and formats for My Respect
Region	Date	Format	Version	Label	Ref.
Various	January 14, 2026	Digital download; streaming	Complete	N46Div.; Sony Music	
Japan	January 14, 2026	CD	Standard	N46Div.; Sony Music	
Japan	January 14, 2026	CD+Blu-ray	Complete limited; first press limited type-A; type-B; type-C	N46Div.; Sony Music	
