= Koko ni wa Nai Mono =

- Regular edition cover

Single by Nogizaka46

from the album My Respect
- Language: Japanese
- B-side: "Warui Seibun"; "Kore kara" (Type-A); "Sentō Rhapsody" (Type-B); "Ato no Matsuri" (Type-C); "Amai Evidence" (Type-D); "17 Funkan" (regular)
- Released: December 7, 2022
- Genre: J-pop
- Length: 5:11
- Label: N46Div.; Sony Japan
- Composer: Nazca
- Lyricist: Yasushi Akimoto
- Producer: Yasushi Akimoto

Nogizaka46 singles chronology
"Suki to Iu no wa Rock da ze!" (2022)	"Koko ni wa Nai Mono" (2022)	"Hito wa Yume o Nido Miru" (2023)

Music video
- "Koko ni wa Nai Mono" on YouTube

"Koko ni wa Nai Mono" (ここにはないもの; lit. "What Is Not Here") is a song recorded by Japanese idol girl group Nogizaka46. It was released as the group's thirty-first single on December 7, 2022, through N46Div. and Sony Music Records. First-generation member Asuka Saitō served as her eighth center position of the performance since the latest 2019 single "Sing Out!" and participated as her last single from the group. Its accompanying music video premiered ahead on November 19. Commercially, "Koko ni wa Nai Mono" reached number one on the Oricon Singles Chart and number two on the Billboard Japan Hot 100, and was certified million by Recording Industry Association of Japan (RIAJ).

== Background and release ==
On October 31, 2022, at their show Nogizaka Under Construction, Nogizaka46 announced their thirty-first single, scheduled for release on December 7 on four limited CD+Blu-ray, a regular CD, and special digital extended play. On November 4, Asuka Saitō, a first-generation member, announced her graduation (leaving) from the group via her official blog, stated that she plans to end up her group's activities in December 2022 and hold her graduation concert next year. The next day, she and the group held live streaming via the YouTube channel Nogizaka Streaming Now at 19:30 JST, revealed the song title "Koko ni wa Nai Mono", and senbatsu members, including Saitō who is in charge of the center position. Front and back cover artworks for all physical editions of "Koko ni wa Nai Mono", taken by Toshiaki Kitaoka, was revealed on November 9, expressing multiple exposure that superimposes the members and various events related to Saitō. All Blu-rays included the group's performances at Midsummer National Tour 2022, which was held between August 29 and 31 at Meiji Jingu Stadium, Tokyo.

== Music video ==
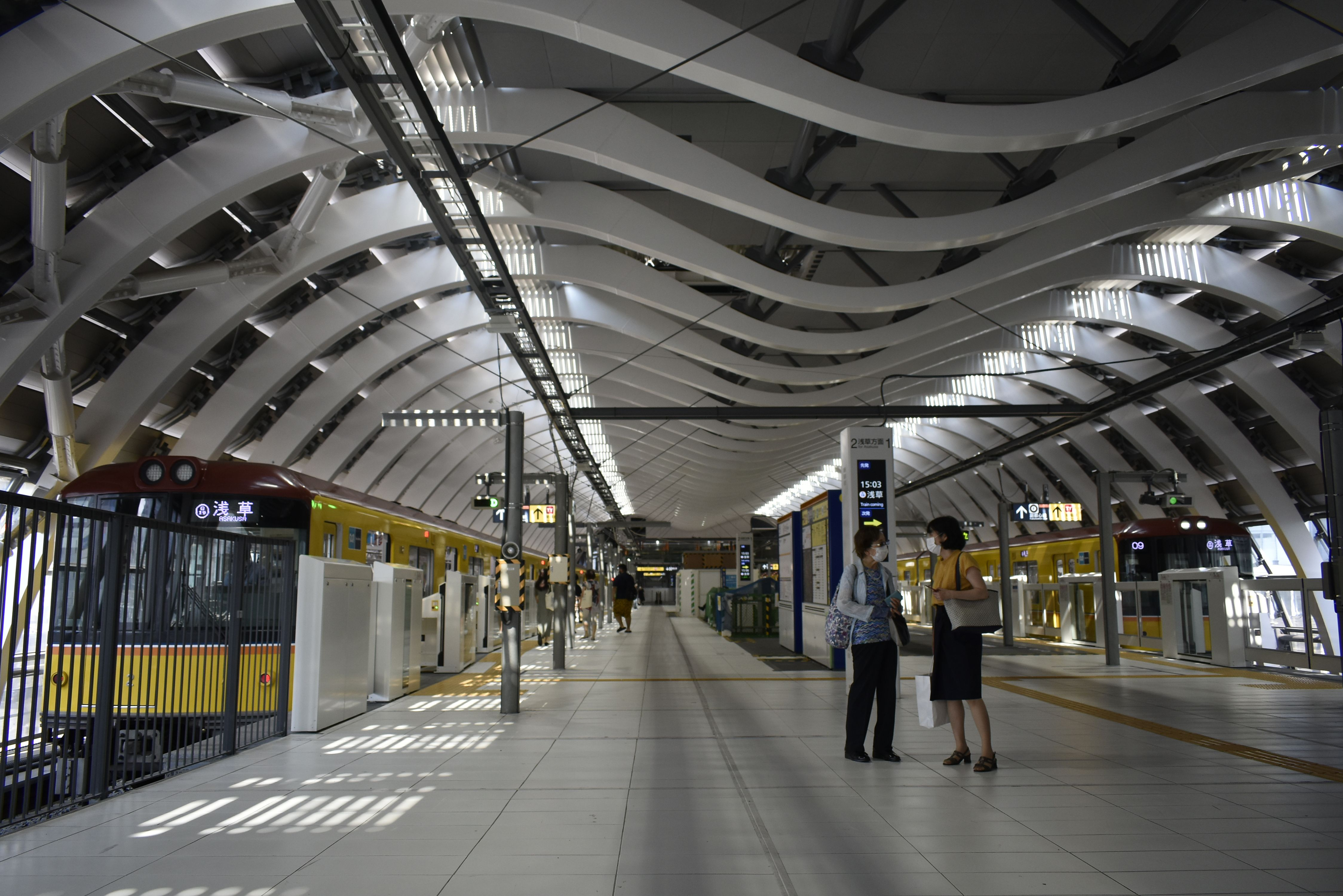
Tokyo Metro Ginza Line Shibuya Station's platform (pictured) is the one place of "Koko ni wa Nai Mono" music video filming.

An accompanying music video for "Koko ni wa Nai Mono" was uploaded via Nogizaka46's official YouTube channel on November 19, 2022. It was directed by Keiji Kobayashi and shot from late October to early November. The choreography scene was filmed on the rooftop of building in Roppongi Hills, while Saitō's solo part was on Tokyo Metro Ginza Line Shibuya Station's platform. The story depicts Saitō, who is an employee at a clothes shop, chasing her dream of becoming a designer, even though she felt that it was impossible.

=== B-sides ===
The music video for under members' track "Warui Seibun", which served Reno Nakamura as the center position, was uploaded on November 22. It was directed by Atsunori Tōshi, and shot at Tipstar Dome, a velodrome in Chiba. The music video expresses the theme of chasing two ingredients; a bad one and a gentle one. The next is fifth-generation "17 Funkan", which the center position is Sakura Kawasaki, released on December 1. Shot at a school in Ibaraki, the music video is directed by Mitsunori Yokobori, showing the members trying to restart the clock that has stopped at 5:17 with gears containing their own thoughts. Saitō's solo track "Kore kara" music video was uploaded on December 7, directed by Santa Yamagishi. It shows Saitō flashbacking her past, present, and future. The music video of "Ato no Matsuri", self-made by the members who sing the song, was released on December 10.

== Commercial performance ==
On the release day, Soundscan Japan reported that the CD single "Koko ni wa Nai Mono" sold over 643,390 copies on its flying get day, becoming their highest single physical sales since COVID-19 pandemic, surpassed 542,558 copies of the previous single "Suki to Iu no wa Rock da ze!". "Koko ni wa Nai Mono" entered Billboard Japan Hot 100 at number two in the chart issue dated December 14, 2022, behind only Official Hige Dandism's "Subtitle". In its first week, the single earned 830,384 CD sales, debuting atop the Top Singles Sales chart; and 11,486 downloads, peaked at number four on the Download Songs.

"Koko ni wa Nai Mono" debuted at number one Oricon Singles Chart in the chart issue dated December 19, 2022, becoming the group's thirty consecutive number-one single since their 2012 single "Oide Shampoo", and the second most consecutive number-one singles in Japan, behind only AKB48 with 47 singles at that time. The single sold 654,000 copies in its first week, making the group monopolizing the entire top three the biggest single sales week by a female act in 2022–"Koko ni wa Nai Mono", "Suki to Iu no wa Rock da ze!" (577,000 copies), and "Actually... (463,000 copies). "Koko ni wa Nai Mono" was certified million for physical shipments by Recording Industry Association of Japan (RIAJ) on February 10; the first in three years since the 25th single "Shiawase no Hogoshoku".

== Live performances ==
On November 4, 2022, Nogizaka46 gave the debut performance of "Koko ni wa Nai Mono" through their YouTube channel Nogizaka Streaming Now. In the beginning, Saitō, wearing the long white dress, appeared alone on the rooftop of Tokyo Solamachi to greet fans. Then, the other members, who also wore the same as Saitō, appeared later. Afterwards, the group performed the song at several Japanese music shows, such as 2022 Best Hits Kayosai on November 11, TV Tokyo Festival 2022 Winter on November 23, Venue101 on November 26, Best Artist 2022 on December 3, as a medley with their 2018 single "Synchronicity", 2022 FNS Music Festival on December 7, alongside "Jin Jin Jingle Bell" collaborated with Chisato Moritaka, CDTV Live! Live! Christmas 4-Hour Special on December 17, the six-hour special Music Station Ultra Super Live 2022 on December 23, and Happyō! Kotoshi Ichiban Kiita Uta: Annual Music Award 2022, along with their 17th single "Influencer", on December 28.

== Participating members ==
The eighteen members of Nogizaka46 were selected to be participating members (senbatsu) for "Koko ni wa Nai Mono", and eleven members for fukujin (first and second-row members). The first-generation member Asuka Saitō was chosen as a center position due to her graduation from the group. The fourth-generation Runa Hayashi was selected for senbatsu for the first time, while the third-generation Tamami Sakaguchi since 2019 single "Sing Out!", and the fourth-generation Seira Hayakawa since 2022 single "Actually...".

- Third row: Yuna Shibata, Renka Iwamoto, Tamami Sakaguchi, Ayame Tsutsui, Seira Hayakawa, Runa Hayashi, Nao Yumiki, Rei Seimiya,
- Second row: Mayu Tamura, Shiori Kubo, Minami Umezawa, Manatsu Akimoto, Ayane Suzuki, Saya Kanagawa
- First row: Haruka Kaki, Sakura Endō, Asuka Saitō (center), Mizuki Yamashita, Yūki Yoda

== Accolades ==
Awards and nominations for "Koko ni wa Nai Mono"
Ceremony	Year	Award	Result	Ref.
Japan Gold Disc Award	2023	Best 5 Singles	Won	

== Track listing ==
All lyrics are written by Yasushi Akimoto, except the off-vocal tracks.

Limited Type-A – CD
No.	Title	Music	Arrangement	Length
1.	"Koko ni wa Nai Mono" (ここにはないもの; senbatsu members)	Nazca	The Third	5:11
2.	"Warui Seibun" (悪い成分; under members)	Mitsuru Wakabayashi	Wakabayashi	4:20
3.	"Kore kara" (これから; Asuka Saitō)	Kenta Urashima; Hiroto Kikuchi	Kikuchi	4:53
4.	"Koko ni wa Nai Mono" (off vocal version)			5:11
5.	"Warui Seibun" (off vocal version)			4:20
6.	"Kore kara" (off vocal version)			4:51
Total length:				28:46

Limited Type-A: Midsummer National Tour 2022 @ Meiji Jingu Stadium – Blu-ray
No.	Title	Length
1.	"Suki to Iu no wa Rock da ze!"
2.	"Jikochū de Ikō!"
3.	"Kimi ni Shikarareta"
4.	"Making of Midsummer National Tour 2022 Meiji Jingu Stadium #1"
Total length:		60:48

Limited Type-B – CD
No.	Title	Music	Arrangement	Length
1.	"Koko ni wa Nai Mono"			5:11
2.	"Warui Seibun"			4:20
3.	"Sentō Rhapsody" (銭湯ラプソディー; Minami Umezawa, Saya Kanagawa, Mayu Tamura, Mizuki Yamashita, Yūki Yoda)	Masaki Honda	Honda	4:03
4.	"Koko ni wa Nai Mono" (off vocal version)			5:11
5.	"Warui Seibun" (off vocal version)			4:20
6.	"Sentō Rhapsody" (off vocal version)			4:02
Total length:				27:07

Limited Type-B: Midsummer National Tour 2022 @ Meiji Jingu Stadium – Blu-ray
No.	Title	Length
1.	"Under's Love"
2.	"Band-Aid Hagasu Yō na Wakarekata"
3.	"Jumping Joker Flash"
4.	"Boku ga Te o Tataku Hō e"
5.	"Making of Midsummer National Tour 2022 Meiji Jingu Stadium #2"
Total length:		53:09

Limited Type-C – CD
No.	Title	Music	Arrangement	Length
1.	"Koko ni wa Nai Mono"			5:11
2.	"Warui Seibun"			4:20
3.	"Ato no Matsuri" (アトノマツリ; Sakura Endō, Haruka Kaki, Yuri Kitagawa, Runa Hayashi, Nao Yumiki)	Takuya Fujita	Fujita	5:02
4.	"Koko ni wa Nai Mono" (off vocal version)			5:11
5.	"Warui Seibun" (off vocal version)			4:20
6.	"Ato no Matsuri" (off vocal version)			5:01
Total length:				29:05

Limited Type-C: Midsummer National Tour 2022 @ Meiji Jingu Stadium – Blu-ray
No.	Title	Length
1.	"Gomen ne Fingers Crossed"
2.	"Actually..."
3.	"Fukayomi"
4.	"Suki ni Nattemita"
5.	"Making of Midsummer National Tour 2022 Meiji Jingu Stadium #3"
Total length:		57:07

Limited Type-D – CD
No.	Title	Music	Arrangement	Length
1.	"Koko ni wa Nai Mono"			5:11
2.	"Warui Seibun"			4:20
3.	"Amai Evidence" (甘いエビデンス; Riria Itō, Shiori Kubo, Yuna Shibata, Reno Nakamura, Runa Hayashi)	Rei Sakamoto	Tsutanaohiko	4:31
4.	"Koko ni wa Nai Mono" (off vocal version)			5:11
5.	"Warui Seibun" (off vocal version)			4:20
6.	"Amai Evidence" (off vocal version)			4:30
Total length:				28:03

Limited Type-D: Midsummer National Tour 2022 @ Meiji Jingu Stadium – Blu-ray
No.	Title	Length
1.	"Kodokuna Aozora"
2.	"Naitatte Ii Janai ka?"
3.	"Hane no Kioku"
4.	"Sing Out!"
5.	"Making of Midsummer National Tour 2022 Meiji Jingu Stadium #4"
Total length:		64:05

Regular – CD
No.	Title	Music	Arrangement	Length
1.	"Koko ni wa Nai Mono"			5:11
2.	"Warui Seibun"			4:20
3.	"17 Funkan" (17分間; fifth generation members)	Hiroyuki Himeno	Apazzi	5:32
4.	"Koko ni wa Nai Mono" (off vocal version)			5:11
5.	"Warui Seibun" (off vocal version)			4:20
6.	"17 Funkan" (off vocal version)			5:31
Total length:				30:07

Special edition – digital download, streaming
No.	Title	Length
1.	"Koko ni wa Nai Mono"	5:11
2.	"Warui Seibun"	4:20
3.	"Kore kara"	4:53
4.	"Sentō Rhapsody"	4:03
5.	"Ato no Matsuri"	5:02
6.	"Amai Evidence"	4:31
7.	"17 Funkan"	5:32
Total length:		33:33

== Charts ==
=== Weekly charts ===
Weekly chart performance for "Koko ni wa Nai Mono"
Chart (2022)	Peak position
Japan (Japan Hot 100)	2
Japan (Oricon)	1
Japan Combined Singles (Oricon)	1
Japanese Combined Albums (Oricon)	11

=== Monthly charts ===
Monthly chart performance for "Koko ni wa Nai Mono "
Chart (2022)	Position
Japan (Oricon)	1

=== Year-end charts ===
2022 year-end chart performance for "Koko ni wa Nai Mono"
Chart (2022)	Position
Japan (Oricon)	5

2023 year-end chart performance for "Koko ni wa Nai Mono"
Chart (2023)	Position
Japan (Oricon)	62
Japan Top Singles Sales (Billboard Japan)	3

== Certifications ==
Sales certifications for "Koko ni wa Nai Mono"
Region	Certification	Certified units/sales
Japan (RIAJ)	Million	1,000,000^{^}
^{^} Shipments figures based on certification alone.

== Release history ==
Release dates and formats for "Koko ni wa Nai Mono"
Region	Date	Format	Version	Label	Ref.
Various	December 7, 2022	Digital download; streaming	Special	N46Div.; Sony Japan	
Japan	December 7, 2022	CD+Blu-ray	Type-A; Type-B; Type-C; Type-D	N46Div.; Sony Japan	
Japan	December 7, 2022	CD	Regular	N46Div.; Sony Japan	

== See also ==
- List of Oricon number-one singles of 2022
