= Suki to Iu no wa Rock da ze! =

- Regular edition cover

Single by Nogizaka46

from the album My Respect
- Language: Japanese
- B-side: "Under's Love"; "Boku ga Te o Tataku Hō e" (Type-A); "Jumping Joker Flash" (Type-B); "Band-Aid Hagasu Yō na Wakarekata" (Type-C); "Passion Fruit no Tabekata" (Type-D); "Yume o Miru Kinniku" (regular)
- Released: August 31, 2022
- Genre: J-pop
- Length: 5:32
- Label: N46Div.; Sony Japan
- Composer: Yōichirō Nomura
- Lyricist: Yasushi Akimoto
- Producer: Yasushi Akimoto

Nogizaka46 singles chronology
"Actually..." (2022)	"Suki to Iu no wa Rock da ze!" (2022)	"Koko ni wa Nai Mono" (2022)

Music video
- "Suki to Iu no wa Rock da ze!" on YouTube

"Suki to Iu no wa Rock da ze!" (好きというのはロックだぜ！, Suki to Iu no wa Rokku da ze!; lit. "The Thing I Like Is Rock!") is a song recorded by Japanese idol girl group Nogizaka46. It was released as the group's thirtieth single on August 31, 2022, through N46Div. and Sony Music Records. Haruka Kaki served as the center position of the single.

== Background and release ==
On July 11, 2022, during the end credits of their hosted variety show Nogizaka Under Construction, Nogizaka46 announced their thirtieth single, which would be released on August 31. The senbatsu members were announced in the next week on the program. Before the announcement, on July 10, the group announced that Seira Hayakawa would go on hiatus temporarily starting on the same day due to poor health conditions. On July 18, Hina Higuchi and Maaya Wada announced they will graduate from the group after finishing the 30th single activities.

During the first show of their Midsummer National Tour 2022 on July 19 at Osaka-jō Hall, Nogizaka46 revealed and performed the single for the first time, titled "Suki to Iu no wa Rock da ze!", including B-sides sung by the under members, titled "Under's Love", and the fifth generation members, titled "Band-Aid Hagasu Yō na Wakarekata", serving Maaya Wada and Satsuki Sugawara as the center position, respectively. Cover artworks for all editions were revealed on July 27. Taken by Akiko Isobe, they show the members relaxing on the beach happily in the strong sunlight. "Suki to Iu no wa Rock da ze!" was unveiled for the first time on July 28, through Tokyo FM's radio show School of Lock! in the part of Nogizaka Lock!.

On August 1, Nogizaka46 announced the campaign to commemorate the release of "Suki to Iu no wa Rock da ze!", called "30 Nichi Renzoku 30 Kaikin Matsuri da ze!", to reveal the single's information every day until the release date. On the same day, the group unveiled the uncompleted track listing, showing two new tracks: "Boku ga Te o Tataku Hō e" by the third generation, and "Jumping Joker Flash" by the fourth generation. Unlike previous singles, "Suki to Iu no wa Rock da ze!" did not include the music video on the Blu-ray from the limited editions, replacing by footages from their last year Midsummer National Tour 2021.

== Music video ==
An accompanying music video for "Suki to Iu no wa Rock da ze!" was premiered on August 4, 2022. Directed by Yuki Kamiya (Maxilla), the music video shows the center Kaki thinking about what she will do this summer vacation, depicting inside her brain represented by the other members being meeting to discuss what she will do, between shopping, staying at home, camping, going to a dessert café, or a museum. Finally, she decided to do everything everyone presented. The choreography scenes were shot at Haneda Airport new Terminal 2 international departure lobby.

=== B-sides ===
The music video for "Under's Love" was uploaded on August 6, 2022, directed by Shinichiro Kobayashi. Shot at studio in Tokyo and the former kart track in Saitama, it depicts the members as vampire. "Band-Aid Hagasu Yō na Wakarekata" music video was uploaded on August 12. It was directed by Nozomu Hayashi and shot at Ashikaga, Tochigi, depicting a high school student (Satsuki Sugawara) who attends a rigorous study-intensive school and gradually becomes friends with their classmates. "Jumping Joker Flash" music video, directed by Ōkubo Takurō, was released on August 16, showing a new student (Ayame Tsutsui) mistakenly joins the "cleaning and washing club". The music video for "Boku ga Te o Tataku Hō e" was uploaded on August 20, directed by Shūto Itō, showing the members play the musical. Shiori Kubo (center) handled both actress and director.

== Commercial performance ==
"Suki to Iu no wa Rock da ze!" debuted at number one on the Oricon Singles Chart, selling 576,597 CD single copies on the week of September 12, 2022, becoming Nogizaka46's 29th consecutive number-one single. The group also became the first female artist to sell CD over 500,000 copies in the first week of 2022. The song peaked at number two on the Billboard Japan Hot 100, behind only Ado's "New Genesis", with 720,302 CD single sales, and 4,696 downloads.

== Live performances ==
Nogizaka46 performed "Suki to Iu no wa Rock da ze!" for the first time on July 19, 2022, at the Osaka show of their Midsummer National Tour 2022. They gave the televised debut performance of the song at a four-hour special of CDTV Live! Live! on August 29, The group also performed the song at Music Station on September 2. and FNS Laugh & Music 2022: Uta to Warai no Saiten on September 11.

== Accolades ==
Awards and nominations for "Suki to Iu no wa Rock da ze!"
Ceremony	Year	Award	Result	Ref.
Japan Gold Disc Award	2023	Best 5 Singles	Won	

== Track listing ==
All lyrics are written by Yasushi Akimoto, except the off-vocal tracks.

Limited Type-A – CD
No.	Title	Music	Arrangement	Length
1.	"Suki to Iu no wa Rock da ze!" (好きというのはロックだぜ！)	Yōichirō Nomura	Nomura	5:32
2.	"Under's Love"	Amazuti	Amazuti	4:19
3.	"Boku ga Te o Tataku Hō e" (僕が手を叩く方へ)	Ichiro Fujitani	Fujitani	4:35
4.	"Suki to Iu no wa Rock da ze!" (off vocal version)			5:32
5.	"Under's Love" (off vocal version)			4:19
6.	"Boku ga Te o Tataku Hō e" (off vocal version)			4:33
Total length:				28:50

Limited Type-A (Midsummer National Tour 2021: Summer Song Edition + Fifth Generation Individual PV) – Blu-ray
No.	Title	Director(s)	Length
1.	"Taiyō Knock @ Osaka-jō Hall" (2021.7.14)		2:54
2.	"Romantic Ikayaki @ Sekisui Heim Super Arena" (2021.7.17)		3:02
3.	"Girls' Rule @ Nippon Gaishi Hall" (2021.8.14)		3:23
4.	"Hadashi de Summer @ Marine Messe Fukuoka" (2021.8.22)		3:43
5.	"Mao Ioki" (五百城茉央)	Denki Imahara	6:08
6.	"Teresa Ikeda" (池田瑛紗)	Carl Lewis	5:27
7.	"Miku Ichinose" (一ノ瀬美空)	Saki Hiraoka	5:53
Total length:			30:30

Limited Type-B – CD
No.	Title	Music	Arrangement	Length
1.	"Suki to Iu no wa Rock da ze!"			5:32
2.	"Under's Love"			4:19
3.	"Jumping Joker Flash" (ジャンピングジョーカーフラッシュ)	Kuboty	Kuboty	4:00
4.	"Suki to Iu no wa Rock da ze!" (off vocal version)			5:32
5.	"Under's Love" (off vocal version)			4:19
6.	"Jumping Joker Flash" (off vocal version)			3:58
Total length:				27:40

Limited Type-B (Midsummer National Tour 2021: Unit Song Edition + Fifth Generation Individual PV) – Blu-ray
No.	Title	Director(s)	Length
1.	"Fantastic Sanshoku Pan @ Marine Messe Fukuoka" (2021.8.22)		6:10
2.	"Zabun Zazabun @ Marine Messe Fukuoka" (2021.8.21)		3:05
3.	"Threefold Choice @ Osaka-jō Hall" (2021.7.14)		2:43
4.	"Yūjō Pierce @ Marine Messe Fukuoka" (2021.8.22)		3:03
5.	"Kotodamahō @ Nippon Gaishi Hall" (2021.8.15)		3:24
6.	"Nagi Inoue" (井上和)	Nozomi Hayashi	6:47
7.	"Hina Okamoto" (岡本姫奈)	Kanchi Takano	6:46
Total length:			31:58

Limited Type-C – CD
No.	Title	Music	Arrangement	Length
1.	"Suki to Iu no wa Rock da ze!"			5:32
2.	"Under's Love"			4:19
3.	"Band-Aid Hagasu Yō na Wakarekata" (バンドエイド剥がすような別れ方)	A-Note; S-Tone	A-Note; S-Tone	4:49
4.	"Suki to Iu no wa Rock da ze!" (off vocal version)			5:32
5.	"Under's Love" (off vocal version)			4:19
6.	"Band-Aid Hagasu Yō na Wakarekata" (off vocal version)			4:48
Total length:				29:19

Limited Type-C (Midsummer National Tour 2021: Under Song Edition + 5th Generation Individual PV) – Blu-ray
No.	Title	Director(s)	Length
1.	"Do My Best: Ja Imi wa Nai @ Sekisui Heim Super Arena" (2021.7.17)		3:06
2.	"My Rule @ Nippon Gaishi Hall" (2021.8.14)		3:00
3.	"Sabita Compass @ Nippon Gaishi Hall" (2021.8.15)		2:50
4.	"Nichijō @ Marine Messe Fukuoka" (2021.8.21)		3:03
5.	"Aya Ogawa" (小川彩)	Akari Okada	6:14
6.	"Iroha Okuda" (奥田いろは)	Daisaku Fujino	6:00
7.	"Sakura Kawasaki" (川﨑桜)	Yukiko Matsuo	4:47
Total length:			29:00

Limited Type-D – CD
No.	Title	Music	Arrangement	Length
1.	"Suki to Iu no wa Rock da ze!"			5:32
2.	"Under's Love"			4:19
3.	"Passion Fruit no Tabekata" (パッションフルーツの食べ方)	Kanata Okajima; Katsuhiko Sugiyama	Sugiyama	3:40
4.	"Suki to Iu no wa Rock da ze!" (off vocal version)			5:32
5.	"Under's Love" (off vocal version)			4:19
6.	"Passion Fruit no Tabekata" (off vocal version)			3:39
Total length:				27:01

Limited Type-D (Midsummer National Tour 2021: Full Song Edition) – Blu-ray
No.	Title	Director(s)	Length
1.	"Zenbu Yume no Mama @ Marine Messe Fukuoka" (2021.8.21)		3:12
2.	"Arigachi na Ren'ai @ Nippon Gaishi Hall" (2021.8.15)		2:41
3.	"Jikochū de Ikō! @ Osaka-jō Hall" (2021.7.14)		2:59
4.	"Gomen ne Fingers Crossed @ Nippon Gaishi Hall" (2021.8.14)		4:24
5.	"Satsuki Sugawara" (菅原咲月)	Shigeru Tsukita	6:07
6.	"Nao Tomisato" (冨里奈央)	Minori Hamada	5:53
7.	"Aruno Nakanishi" (中西アルノ)	Tatsunori Satō	4:40
Total length:			29:56

Regular edition – CD
No.	Title	Music	Arrangement	Length
1.	"Suki to Iu no wa Rock da ze!"			5:32
2.	"Under's Love"			4:19
3.	"Yume o Miru Kinniku" (夢を見る筋肉)	Tetsuya Tsukimitsu	Araken	3:55
4.	"Suki to Iu no wa Rock da ze!" (off vocal version)			5:32
5.	"Under's Love" (off vocal version)			4:19
6.	"Yume o Miru Kinniku" (off vocal version)			3:54
Total length:				27:31

Special edition – digital download, streaming
No.	Title	Length
1.	"Suki to Iu no wa Rock da ze!"	5:32
2.	"Under's Love"	4:19
3.	"Boku ga Te o Tataku Hō e"	4:35
4.	"Jumping Joker Flash"	4:00
5.	"Band-Aid Hagasu Yō na Wakarekata"	4:49
6.	"Passion Fruit no Tabekata"	3:40
7.	"Yume o Miru Kinniku"	3:55
Total length:		30:50

== Participating members ==
The nineteen members were selected to be participating members (senbatsu) for "Suki to Iu no wa Rock da ze!", and eleven members for fukujin (first and second-row members), serving Haruka Kaki as the center position after the 28th single "Kimi ni Shikarareta. Saya Kanagawa and Nao Yumiki were selected to participate for the first time, and Kaede Satō returned to be senbatsu since the group's 23rd single "Sing Out!".

- Third row: Saya Kanagawa, Rei Seimiya, Sayaka Kakehashi, Ayane Suzuki, Higuchi Hina, Yuna Shibata, Kaede Satō, Nao Yumiki
- Second row: Mayu Tamura, Shiori Kubo, Minami Umezawa, Manatsu Akimoto, Renka Iwamoto, Ayame Tsutsui
- First row: Yūki Yoda, Asuka Saitō, Haruka Kaki (center), Mizuki Yamashita, Sakura Endō

== Charts ==
=== Weekly charts ===
Weekly chart performance for "Suki to Iu no wa Rock da ze!"
Chart (2022)	Peak position
Japan (Japan Hot 100)	2
Japan (Oricon)	1
Japan Combined Singles (Oricon)	1
Japanese Combined Albums (Oricon)	7

=== Monthly charts ===
Monthly chart performance for "Suki to Iu no wa Rock da ze!"
Chart (2022)	Peak position
Japan (Oricon)	1

=== Year-end charts ===
Year-end chart performance for "Suki to Iu no wa Rock da ze!"
Chart (2022)	Position
Japan Top Singles Sales (Billboard Japan)	4
Japan (Oricon)	4

== Certifications ==
Sales certifications for "Suki to Iu no wa Rock da ze!"
Region	Certification	Certified units/sales
Japan (RIAJ)	3× Platinum	750,000^{^}
^{^} Shipments figures based on certification alone.

== Release history ==
Release history for "Suki to Iu no wa Rock da ze!"
Region	Date	Format	Version	Label	Ref.
Various	August 24, 2022	Digital download; streaming	Special	N46Div.; Sony Japan	
Japan	August 31, 2022	CD+Blu-ray	Type-A; Type-B; Type-C; Type-D	N46Div.; Sony Japan	
Japan	August 31, 2022	CD	Regular	N46Div.; Sony Japan	

== See also ==
- List of Oricon number-one singles of 2022
