= List of Oricon number-one singles of 2022 =

The following is a list of Oricon number-one singles of 2022.

== Chart history ==
Issue date	Song	Artist(s)	Ref.
January 3	"Nanairo"	Bump of Chicken	
January 10	"Ichizu" / "Sakayume"	King Gnu	
January 17	"Ubu Love"	Naniwa Danshi	
January 24	"Zankyosanka" / "Asa ga Kuru"	Aimer	
January 31	"Reimei" / "Susumu Shika nē"	Johnny's West	
February 7	"A Woo!!"	Golden Child	
February 14	"Gunjō no Ito"	Kiyoshi Hikawa	
February 21	"It's a Bop"	Octpath	
February 28	"Chocolate Melancholy"	≠Me	
March 7	"Koi to Ai no Sono Aida ni wa"	NMB48	
March 14	"Kyōmei"	SixTones	
March 21	"Kokoro ni Flower"	SKE48	
March 28	"Kojyundo Romance"	KinKi Kids	
April 4	"Actually..."	Nogizaka46	
April 11	"Brother Beat"	Snow Man	
April 18	"Samidare yo"	Sakurazaka46	
April 25	"Lovin' You" / "Odoruyō ni Jinsei o"	King & Prince	
May 2	I ("Call 119" / "We Are")	INI	
May 9	"The Answer / "Sachiare"	Naniwa Danshi	
May 16	Dimension: Senkō ("Tamed-Dashed" / "Drunk-Dazed" / "Always")	Enhypen	
May 23	"Ai Mashō" / "Hade ni Yacchai na!" / "Aisubekibeki Human Life"	Angerme	
May 30	"Motokaredesu"	AKB48	
June 6	"Area" / "Koi wo Surunda" / "Harutsubame"	Hey! Say! JUMP	
June 13	"Boku Nanka"	Hinatazaka46	
June 20	"Watashi"	SixTones	
June 27	"Loser" / "Sanjūshi"	NEWS	
July 4	"Biisan wa Naze Naku Naru no ka?"	HKT48	
July 11	"Adrenaline Dame" / "Yowasa ja Nai yo, Koi wa" / "Idol Tenshoku Ondo"	Tsubaki Factory	
July 18	"Kassai"	Kanjani Eight	
July 25	"Orange Kiss"	Snow Man	
August 1	"Clap Clap"	NiziU	
August 8	"Amazing Love"	KinKi Kids	
August 15	"Hoshi no Ame"	Johnny's West	
August 22	"Kiseki ga Sora ni Koi wo Hibikaseta"	M!lk	
August 29	"Two as One"	Kis-My-Ft2	
September 5	M ("Password")	INI	
September 12	"Suki to Iu no wa Rock da ze!"	Nogizaka46	
September 19	"Trust Me, Trust You"	Sexy Zone	
September 26	"TraceTrace"	King & Prince	
October 3	"Suki da Mushi"	NMB48	
October 10	"Be Selfish"	=Love	
October 17	"Zettai Inspiration"	SKE48	
October 24	Midnight Sun ("SuperCali")	JO1	
October 31	"Hisashiburi no Lip Gloss"	AKB48	
November 7	"Tsuki to Hoshi ga Odoru Midnight"	Hinatazaka46	
November 14	"Good Luck!" / "Futari"	SixTones	
November 21	"Tsukiyomi" / "Irodori"	King & Prince	
November 28	"Happy Surprise"	Naniwa Danshi	
December 5	"Kick Back"	Kenshi Yonezu	
December 12	"Tsukiyomi" / "Irodori"	King & Prince	
December 19	"Koko ni wa Nai Mono"	Nogizaka46	
December 26	"Omoibana"	Kis-My-Ft2	

== See also ==
- List of Oricon number-one albums of 2022
