= Actually... =

- Regular edition cover

Single by Nogizaka46

from the album My Respect
- B-side: "Fukayomi"; "Kachi Aru Mono" (Type-A); "Wasurenaito Ii na" (Type-B); "Todokanakutatte..." (Type-C); "Zetsubō no Ichi-byō Mae" (Type-D); "Suki ni Nattemita" (Regular)
- Released: March 23, 2022
- Genre: J-pop
- Length: 3:40
- Label: N46Div.; Sony Music Japan
- Composer: Namito
- Lyricist: Yasushi Akimoto
- Producer: Yasushi Akimoto

Nogizaka46 singles chronology
"Saigo no Tight Hug" (2021)	"Actually..." (2022)	"Suki to Iu no wa Rock da ze!" (2022)

Music video
- "Actually..." on YouTube

"Actually..." is a song recorded by Japanese idol girl group Nogizaka46. It was released as the group's twenty-ninth single on March 23, 2022, through N46Div. and Sony Music Records. The song was written by Yasushi Akimoto and Namito. Commercially, the single peaked atop both Oricon Singles Chart, and Billboard Japan Hot 100.

Aruno Nakanishi originally served as the center position of the single, becoming the first fifth generation member to be in the center position and appear on a title track. However, due to the resurfacing of some of her past controversial statements, she announced that she would refrain from activities. Instead, during promotions for the single, Asuka Saito and Mizuki Yamashita performed as double centers for the song.

== Background and release ==
On January 31, 2022, at end of the group's television show Nogizaka Under Construction, Nogizaka46 announced their twenty-ninth single, which would be released on March 23, six months after its predecessor, twenty-eighth single "Kimi ni Shikarareta", and three months after the greatest hit album, Time Flies. Pre-orders for the CD single began on the same day in five editions: four limited (A, B, C, D), and a regular. The special edition digital EP was released on March 16, a week before the CD single release.

On February 1, it was announced that Hinako Kitano, a second generation member, would graduate from the group in late April and would not participate as both a senbatsu and under member.

On the same day, Nogizaka46 announced eleven members joined the group as the fifth generation, from the audition of 87,852 applicants that began in July 2021. Eight members were introduced in February, while the other three after March due to academic reasons. The first eight members were officially introduced on the group's official YouTube channel: Nagi Inoue, Miku Ichinose, Satsuki Sugawara, Aya Ogawa, Nao Tomisato, Iroha Okuda, Aruno Nakanishi, and Mao Ioki. On March 18, unannounced fifth generation member Hina Okamoto announced that she would refrain from activities and went on hiatus after violating the group's activity rules. The next day, another fifth generation member was unveiled: Teresa Ikeda. On March 31, the final fifth generation member, Sakura Kawasaki, was introduced.

The participating members (senbatsu) was announced in the group's television show on February 20. On February 23, the song's title and the center position were announced on their special livestream program Nogizaka46 Hours TV, with the center being fifth generation member Aruno Nakanishi. The complete track listing was revealed on the next day. On March 3, center Nakanishi announced a period of "self-restraint" and took a hiatus from group activities after she confirmed that some past controversial posts on social media came from her. Asuka Saitō and Mizuki Yamashita served in the center position instead for music show performances, and for the music video that was officially released on the YouTube channel.

=== Cover artworks ===
The cover artworks for all editions of "Actually..." were revealed on February 28. Ofby for Tokyo's Yukari handled the art direction, while the photographs are taken by Hayato Takahashi. Described by the group as a "unique world view", "mysterious feeling", and "hope for the future", the covers depict the Nogizaka46 standing dignified in the world that the nature has been transformed into metal, to express two contradictory worlds of "transience" and "strength" at the same time.

== Commercial performance ==
For Oricon, "Actually..." entered the Digital Singles Chart at number 13 with 3,142 units. The special edition topped the Digital Albums Chart, selling 3,040 units on its first week. A week later, after the CD single release, the song debuted at number one on the Oricon Singles Chart with 463,439 CD sales, becoming the highest first week sales of 2022, and the group's 28 consecutive number-one single since "Oide Shampoo". "Actually..." also debuted at number 80 on the Billboard Japan Hot 100, and peaked atop the chart on the next week. It also topped the Top Single Sales, selling 561,071 copies.

== Music video ==
There are two versions of accompanying music videos for "Actually...". The first version, a twenty minute long drama directed by Kiyoshi Kurosawa, featuring Aruno Nakanishi as center, was shot in January and was included on the CD single only. The second version, featuring Asuka Saitō and Mizuki Yamashita in the center position, was released on March 20, 2022. This version was directed by Atsunori Tōshi, and was shot at Sankaku Hiroba, located at Shinjuku Sumitomo Building in Shinjuku, Tokyo.

=== B-sides ===
The music video for "Kachi Aru Mono" was uploaded on March 11. Shot in late January, it was directed by Atsunori Tōshi, who also directed the group's music video "Gomen ne Fingers Crossed". With "travel" concept, it shows "the members traveling around the world and space although it is not possible now".

The music video for "Todokanakutatte...", directed by Hiroya "Brian" Nakano, was released on March 17. Shot in Yokosuka, Kanagawa Prefecture, it depicts the duality of the members by shooting in two completely different locations, the museum and the factory.

Hinako Kitano's graduation song "Wasurenaito Ii no", had its music video released on March 18. Directed by Shūto Itō, it was shot in late January at Kitano's hometown, Chiba, with the theme "A message from the present Kitano to the younger Kitano".

== Live performances ==
Nogizaka46 gave the debut performance of "Actually..." at their special livestream program Nogizaka46 Hours TV and at TV Tokyo's music program TV Tokyo Music Festival 2022 Spring on February 23, 2022. They performed the song at NHK's Shibuya Note on March 5, as well as Nippon TV's Buzz Rhythm 02 on March 25. TBS's CDTV Live! Live! on March 28. TV Asahi's Music Station on April 1, and Fuji TV's Music Fair on April 2.

== Track listing ==
All lyrics are written by Yasushi Akimoto, except the off-vocal tracks.

=== Limited editions ===
Limited Type-A – CD
No.	Title	Music	Arrangement	Length
1.	"Actually..."	Namito	Apazzi	3:40
2.	"Fukayomi" (深読み)	Ryū'ichi Takagi	Takagi	3:54
3.	"Kachi Aru Mono" (価値あるもの)	Katsuhiko Sugiyama	Sugiyama; Yachi Manabu	4:32
4.	"Actually..." (off vocal version)
5.	"Fukayomi" (off vocal version)
6.	"Kachi Aru Mono" (off vocal version)

Limited Type-A – Blu-ray
No.	Title	Director(s)	Length
1.	"Actually..." (music video)	Kiyoshi Kurosawa
2.	"Kachi Aru Mono" (music video)	Atsunori Tōshi	4:36
3.	"5th Generation Documentary" (Mao Ioki, Miku Ichinose, Anonymous One)

Limited Type-B – CD
No.	Title	Music	Arrangement	Length
1.	"Actually..."			3:40
2.	"Fukayomi"			3:54
3.	"Wasurenaito Ii na" (忘れないといいな)	Shintarō Itō	Itō	3:47
4.	"Actually..." (off vocal version)
5.	"Fukayomi" (off vocal version)
6.	"Wasurenaito Ii na" (off vocal version)

Limited Type-B – Blu-ray
No.	Title	Director(s)	Length
1.	"Actually..." (music video)
2.	"Wasurenaito Ii na" (music video)	Shūto Itō	4:12
3.	"5th Generation Documentary" (NagiInoue, Aya Ogawa, Anonymous One)

Limited Type-C – CD
No.	Title	Music	Arrangement	Length
1.	"Actually..."			3:40
2.	"Fukayomi"			3:54
3.	"Todokanakutatte..." (届かなくたって…)	Daisuke Toyama	Toyama	4:42
4.	"Actually..." (off vocal version)
5.	"Fukayomi" (off vocal version)
6.	"Todokanakutatte..." (off vocal version)

Limited Type-C – Blu-ray
No.	Title	Director(s)	Length
1.	"Actually..." (music video)
2.	"Todokanakutatte..." (music video)	Hiroya "Brian" Nakano	4:49
3.	"5th Generation Documentary" (Iroha Okuda, Satsuki Sugawara, Nao Tomisato, Aruno Nakanishi)

Limited Type-D – CD
No.	Title	Music	Arrangement	Length
1.	"Actually..."			3:40
2.	"Fukayomi"			3:54
3.	"Zetsubō no Ichi-byō Mae" (絶望の一秒前)	Tadashi Tsukida	Makoto Wakatabe	4:59
4.	"Actually..." (off vocal version)
5.	"Fukayomi" (off vocal version)
6.	"Zetsubō no Ichi-byō Mae" (off vocal version)

Limited Type-D – Blu-ray
No.	Title	Length
1.	"Actually..." (music video)
2.	"Zetsubō no Ichi-byō Mae" (music video)
3.	"Making of 5th Generation MV"

=== Regular edition ===
Regular edition – CD
No.	Title	Music	Arrangement	Length
1.	"Actually..."			3:40
2.	"Fukayomi"			3:54
3.	"Suki ni Nattemita" (好きになってみた)	Youth Case	Youth Case; Tomoki Ishizuka	4:15
4.	"Actually..." (off vocal version)
5.	"Fukayomi" (off vocal version)
6.	"Suki ni Nattemita" (off vocal version)

=== Special edition ===
Special edition – digital download, streaming
No.	Title	Length
1.	"Actually..."	3:40
2.	"Fukayomi"	3:54
3.	"Kachi Aru Mono"	4:32
4.	"Wasurenaito Ii na"	3:47
5.	"Todokanakutatte..."	4:42
6.	"Zetsubō no Ichi-byō Mae"	4:59
7.	"Suki ni Nattemita"	4:15
Total length:		29:49

== Participating members ==
The eighteen members were selected to be participating members (senbatsu) for "Actually...", and ten members for fukujin (first and second-row members). Yuna Shibata and Aruno Nakanishi were selected to participate for the first time. Nakanishi also serves as the center position. The twenty-ninth single senbatsu also performed "Fuyokami", and "Suki ni Nattemita".

- Third row: Mayu Tamura, Sayaka Kakehashi, Rei Seimiya, Ayane Suzuki, Higuchi Hina, Renka Iwamoto, Yuna Shibata, Seira Hayakawa
- Second row: Shiori Kubo, Haruka Kaki, Yūki Yoda, Sakura Endō, Ayame Tsutsui
- First row: Minami Umezawa, Mizuki Yamashita, Aruno Nakanishi (center), Asuka Saitō, Manatsu Akimoto

For other tracks, "Kachi Aru Mono" is performed by members who reached their legal age in 2022 (Shiori Kubo, Tamami Sakaguchi, Reno Nakamura, Sakura Endō, Haruka Kaki, Saya Kanagawa, Yuri Kitakawa, Rika Satō). "Wasurenaito Ii na" is sung by Hinako Kitano, as her solo graduation song. "Todokanakutatte..." is recorded by the under members, while "Zetsubō no Ichi-byō Mae" by the fifth generation members.

== Reception ==
Aruno Nakanishi's decision to refrain from activities after her past photos and remarks surfaced came as a shock to fans. Many criticized the group's management for not screening the members thoroughly, especially after fellow Hina Okamoto was revealed to be leaking unreleased content pertaining to the group. However, both members resumed activities with the group after their period of "self-restraint" in April 27.

== Charts ==
=== Weekly charts ===
Weekly chart performance for "Actually..."
Chart (2022)	Peak position
Japan (Japan Hot 100)	1
Japan (Oricon)	1
Japan Combined Singles (Oricon)	1
Japanese Digital Albums (Oricon)	1

=== Monthly charts ===
Monthly chart performance for "Actually..."
Chart (2022)	Peak position
Japan (Oricon)	2

=== Year-end charts ===
Year-end chart performance for "Actually..."
Chart (2022)	Position
Japan Top Singles Sales (Billboard Japan)	7
Japan (Oricon)	8

== Certifications ==
Sales certifications for "Actually..."
Region	Certification	Certified units/sales
Japan (RIAJ)	3× Platinum	750,000^{^}
^{^} Shipments figures based on certification alone.

== Release history ==
Release dates and formats for "Actually..."
Region	Date	Format	Version	Label	Ref.
Various	March 16, 2022	Digital download; streaming	Special	N46Div.; Sony Music Japan	
Japan	March 23, 2022	CD+Blu-ray	Limited	N46Div.; Sony Music Japan	
Japan	March 23, 2022	CD	Regular	N46Div.; Sony Music Japan	

== See also ==
- List of Oricon number-one singles of 2022
- List of Hot 100 number-one singles of 2022 (Japan)
