= Manatsu Akimoto =

Japanese television host and actress (born 1993)

- 秋元 真夏
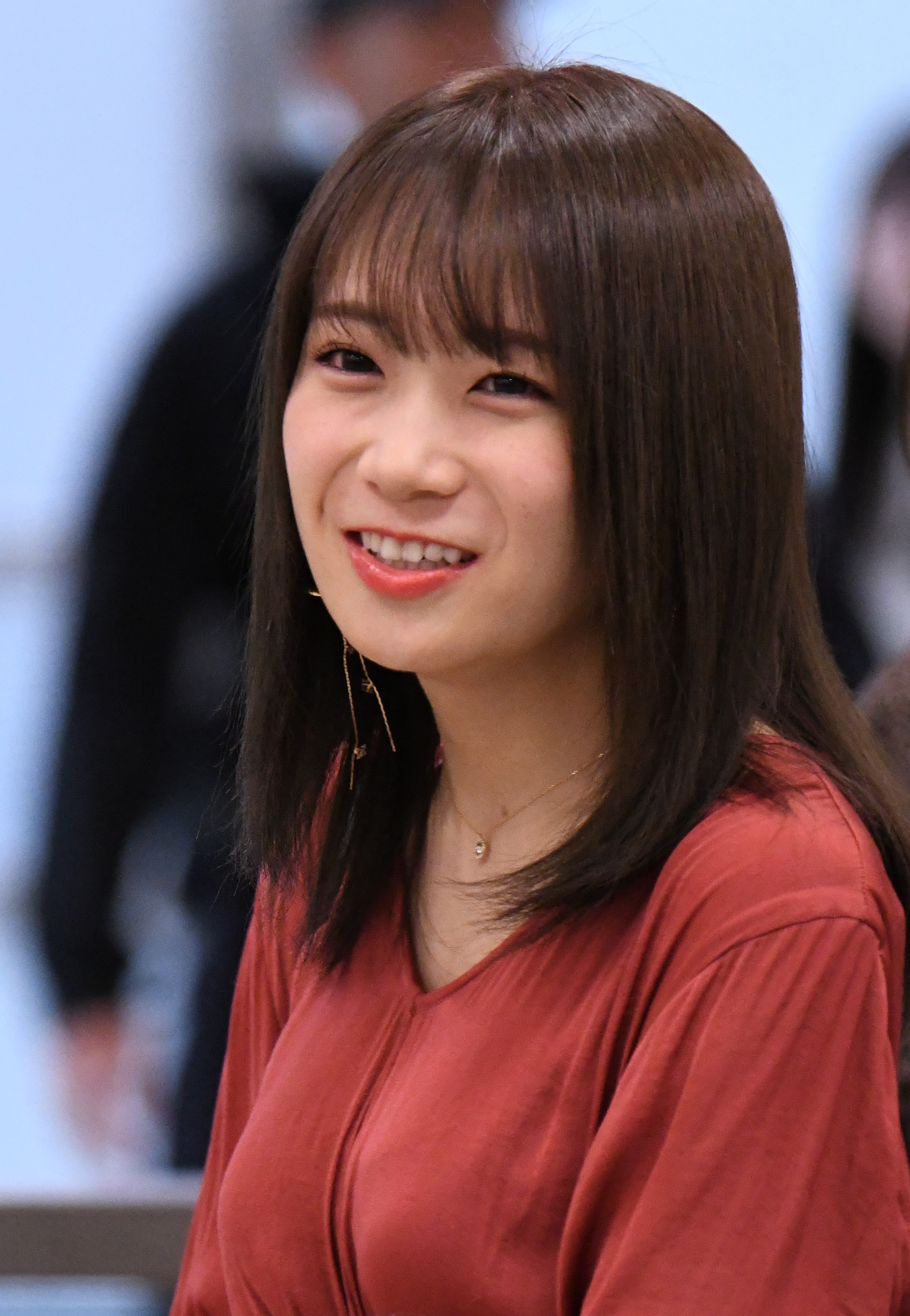
- Akimoto in 2020
- Born: August 20, 1993 (age 32); Tokyo, Japan
- Other names: Manattan (まなったん)
- Occupations: Television host; actress
- Hometown: Saitama, Saitama Prefecture
- Years active: 2011–present
- Agent: Japan Music Entertainment
- Known for: Captain of Nogizaka46 (2019–2023)
- Musical career
- Genres: J-pop
- Years active: 2011–2023
- Label: Sony Records/N46Div
- Formerly of: Nogizaka46

Signature
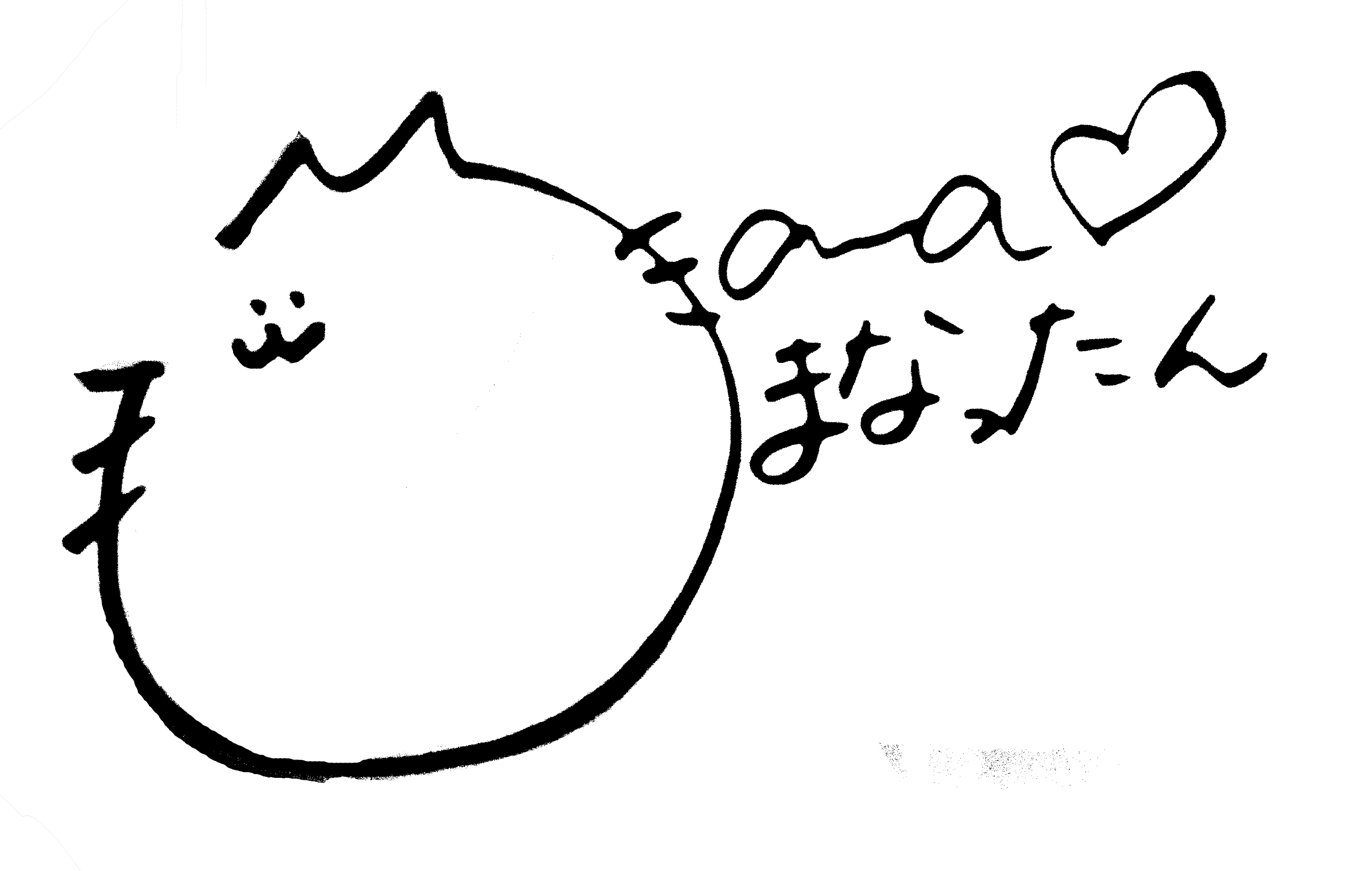

Manatsu Akimoto (秋元 真夏, Akimoto Manatsu; born August 20, 1993) is a Japanese actress. She is a former first generation member of the idol girl group Nogizaka46.

Akimoto was the last first generation member to graduate Nogizaka46 after being in the group for over 11 years since its debut on February 22, 2012. Her graduation concert was held on February 26, 2023.

== Biography ==
Akimoto was born in Tokyo on August 20, 1993. Her family moved to Urawa (now part of Saitama City), Saitama Prefecture, when she was 7 months old, and she was subsequently raised there. When her parents were deciding on her name, her mother suggested naming her "Miruku" or "Hikari," but after much thought, her father decided to name her "Manatsu" as she was born in the summer. She has a younger brother three years her junior.

== Career ==
She was the vice-president of the student council in middle school and was active in the home economics and cooking clubs. In high school, she was the student council president. In her third year of high school, she was informed about the Nogizaka46 first generation member auditions and recruitment. However, Akimoto's career goals at the time were closer towards being a television presenter or actress and she was not actively interested in becoming an idol. She ended up signing up for the auditions on the final deadline date when she stumbled upon the news on her phone.

Akimoto passed the auditions on August 21, 2011, becoming one of the first generation members and a temporary main selection member. However, due to her studies and obligations, she was not active with the rest of the members until she graduated from high school in April 2012. Akimoto enrolled in university, but against her parents' wishes she returned to Nogizaka46, training to prepare for her debut. She was present at almost all Nogizakatte, Doko? studio recordings and Nogizaka46 live concerts as a trainee.

In October 2012, Akimoto was selected as a main selection member for the fourth Nogizaka46 single, "Seifuku no Mannequin", during the recording of a Nogizakatte, Doko? episode, marking her unexpected debut as an official member of Nogizaka46. She debuted as an actress in the television drama Bad Boys J in April 2013. As of 2019, Akimoto is active as a regular main selection member of Nogizaka46. She is also active as a television personality, with numerous appearances on variety shows as a panelist, guest and assistant MC.

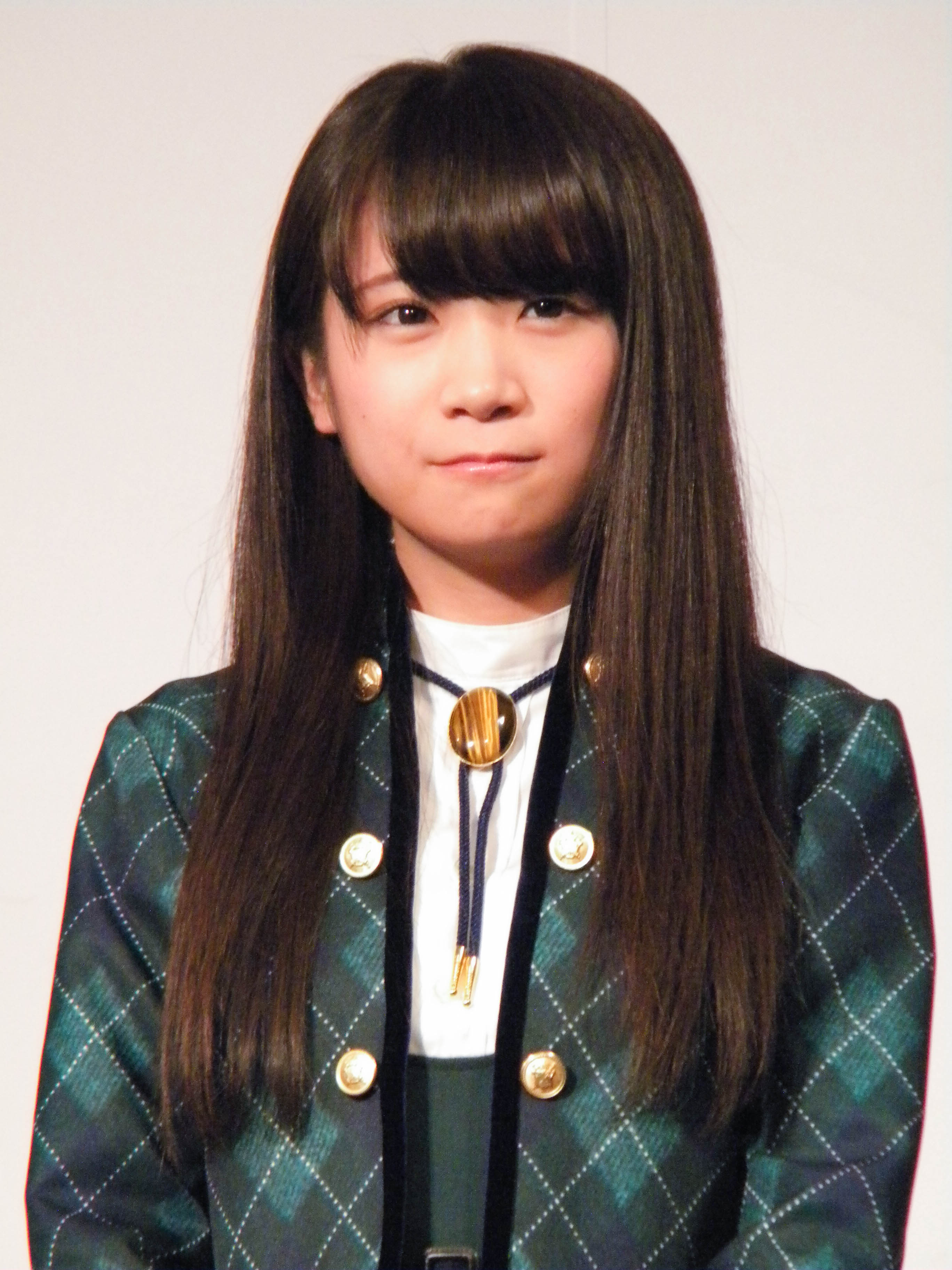
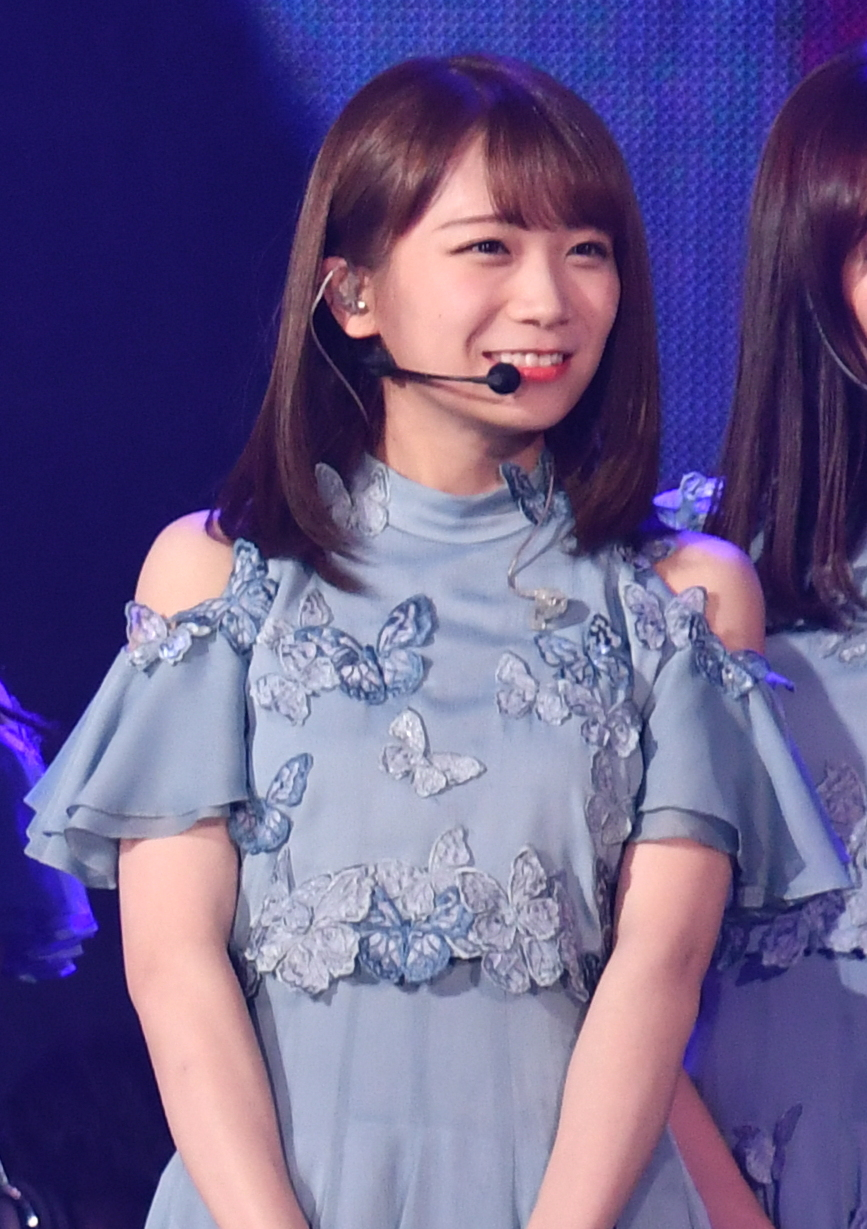
Akimoto in 2014 and 2019

On August 14, 2019, Akimoto was named the next captain of Nogizaka46, succeeding Reika Sakurai.

Akimoto announced her graduation from Nogizaka46 on January 7, 2023. Her graduation concert was held on February 26, 2023. She is the last first generation member to leave the group. Her position was succeeded by third generation member Minami Umezawa as the new captain for Nogizaka46.

On March 1, 2023, Akimoto announced her affiliation with Japan Music Entertainment.

== Public image ==
While Akimoto was part of Nogizaka46, she was adored by her members and was known for her tenacious and patient personality. She was also known as a "people person" because of her exceptional communication skills, as she also hangs out and goes out to eat with many of the Nogizaka members.

Within Nogizaka46, she is close [and still remains] friends with Ikuta Erika, Shiraishi Mai, Asuka Saitō, Nishino Nanase, Reika Sakurai, Sayuri Matsumura, and Rena Matsui.

Despite being in a musical ensemble, she has admitted that she can hardly sing or dance, and her singing voice has been criticized by their group manager, with Akimoto saying, "I'm about the worst in the group in both dancing and singing".

== Discography ==
=== Singles with Nogizaka46 ===
Year	No.	Title	Role	Notes
2012	4	"Seifuku no Mannequin"	A-side	First single to practicipate; Also sang on "Yubi Bōenkyō"
2013	5	"Kimi no Na wa Kibō"	A-side	Also sang on "Shakiism", "Romantic Ikayaki" and "Psychokinesis no Kanosei"
2013	6	"Girl's Rule"	A-side	Also sang on "Sekai de Ichiban Kodoku na Lover" and "Ningen to Iu Gakki"
2013	7	"Barrette"	A-side	Also sang on "Tsuki no Ōkisa" and "Sonna Baka na…"
2014	8	"Kizuitara Kataomoi"	A-side	Also sang on "Romance no Start" and "Toiki no Method"
2014	9	"Natsu no Free & Easy"	A-side	Also sang on "Nani mo Dekizu ni Soba ni Iru" and "Sono Saki no Deguchi"
2014	10	"Nandome no Aozora ka?"	A-side	Also sang on "Korogatta Kane o Narase!" and "Tender Days"
2015	11	"Inochi wa Utsukushii"	A-side	Also sang on "Tachinaorichū"
2015	12	"Taiyō Nokku"	A-side	Also sang on "Muhyōjō" and "Hane no Kioku"
2015	13	"Ima, Hanashitai Dareka ga Iru"	A-side	Also sang on "Popipappapā" and "Kanashimi no Wasurekata"
2016	14	"Harujion ga Sakukoro"	A-side	Also sang on "Yūutsu to Fūsen Gum"
2016	15	"Hadashi de Summer"	A-side	Also sang on "Boku Dake no Hikari"
2016	16	"Sayonara no Imi"	A-side	Also sang on "Kodoku na Aozora" and "2dome no Kiss Kara"
2017	17	"Influencer"	A-side	Also sang on "Jinsei o Kangaetakunaru"
2017	18	"Nigemizu"	A-side	Also sang on "Onna wa Hitori ja Nemurenai", "Hito Natsu no Nagasa Yori…" and "Naitatte Iijanaika?"
2017	19	"Itsuka Dekiru kara Kyō Dekiru"	A-side	Also sang on "Fuminshō" and "Māiika?"
2018	20	"Synchronicity"	A-side	Also sang on "Against" as 1st Generation member
2018	21	"Jikochū de Ikō!"	A-side	Also sang on "Soratobira" and "Anna ni Sukidatta no ni…"
2018	22	"Kaerimichi wa Tōmawari Shitaku Naru"	A-side	Also sang on "Kokuhaku no Junban"
2019	23	"Sing Out!"	A-side	
2019	24	"Yoake Made Tsuyogaranakutemoii"	A-side	Also sang on "Boku no Koto, Shitteru?" and "Boku no Omoikomi"
2020	25	"Shiawase no Hogoshoku"	A-side	Also sang on "Sayonara Stay With Me"
2020	—	"Sekaijū no Rinjin yo"	—	Charity song during the COVID-19 pandemic
2020	—	"Route 246"	—	
2021	26	"Boku wa Boku o Suki ni Naru"	A-side	Also sang on "Ashita ga Aru Riyū" and "Wilderness World"
2021	27	"Gomen ne Fingers Crossed"	A-side	Also sang on "Zenbu Yume no Mama"
2021	28	"Kimi ni Shikarareta"	A-side	Also sang on "Tanin no Sora ni"
2022	29	"Actually…"	A-side	Also sang on "Fukayomi" and Suki ni Natte Mita"
2022	30	"Suki to Iu no wa Rock da ze!"	A-side	
2022	31	"Koko ni wa Nai Mono"	A-side	Last single to participate

=== Albums with Nogizaka46 ===
Year	No.	Title	Participated song
2015	1	Tōmei na Iro	"Boku ga Iru Basho"; "Kakumei no Uma"
2016	2	Sorezore no Isu	"Kikkake"; "Taiyō ni Kudokarete"; "Kuchiyakusoku"
2017	3	Umarete Kara Hajimete Mita Yume	"Skydiving"; "Settei Ondo"; "Bōkyaku to Bigaku"
2019	4	Ima ga Omoide ni Naru made	"Arigachi na Ren'ai"; "Hozue o Tsuite Nemurenai"; "Mosugu ~Zambi Densetsu~"

=== Other featured songs ===
Year	Artist	Title	Albums / Singles
2016	HoneyWorks	"Daikirai na Hazu Datta."	Non-album single
2023	Nogizaka46	"Bokutachi no Sayonara"	Hito wa Yume wo Nido Miru

== Filmography ==
=== Film ===
Year	Title	Role	Notes	Ref(s)
2013	Bad Boys J: The Movie	Mariko Kamijo		
2014	The Three Members of the Paranormal Research Club	Ryoko Yamazaki	Lead role	

=== Television ===
Year	Title	Network	Role	Notes	Ref(s)
2013	Bad Boys J	Nippon Television	Mariko Kamijo		
2015	Burning Flower	NHK	Okugoten	Taiga drama	
2015	Hatsumori Bemars	TV Tokyo	Harvard		
2019	Zambi	Hulu	Saijo Asumi		
2019	The Headhunter	Wowow	Minami Tokuro		
2023	Isn't That Plagiarism?: The Work of a Newbie Intellectual Property Club Member	Nippon Television	Mizuki Shinoyama		
2024	Aoshima-kun is Mean	TV Asahi	Rika Kimura		

== Bibliography ==
=== Photobooks ===
- Manatsu no Kiatsu Haichi (July 28, 2017, Tokumashoten) ISBN 978-4-19-864375-1
- Shiawase ni Shitai (April 8, 2020, Takeshobo) ISBN 978-4-8019-2244-0
