= Minami Umezawa =

Japanese singer, model and actress (born 1999)

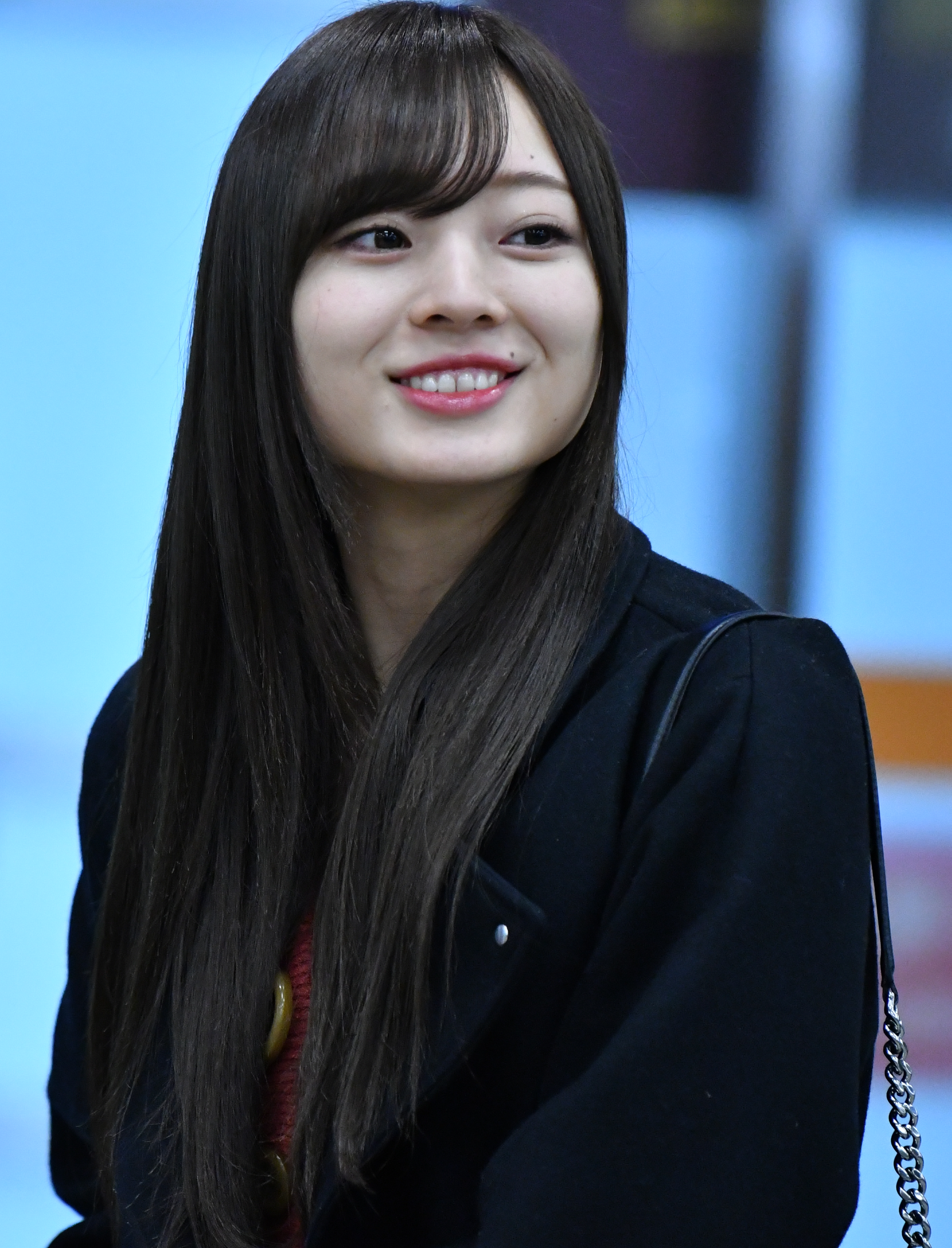
- Umezawa in Taiwan in 2019
- Born: January 7, 1999 (age 27); Hiratsuka, Kanagawa, Japan
- Occupations: Singer; model; actress
- Years active: 2016–present
- Musical career
- Genre: J-pop
- Instrument: Vocals
- Years active: 2016–2026
- Label: Nogizaka.LLC
- Member of: Nogizaka46

Japanese name
- Kanji: 梅澤 美波
- Hiragana: うめざわ みなみ
Transcriptions
- Romanization: Umezawa Minami

Signature
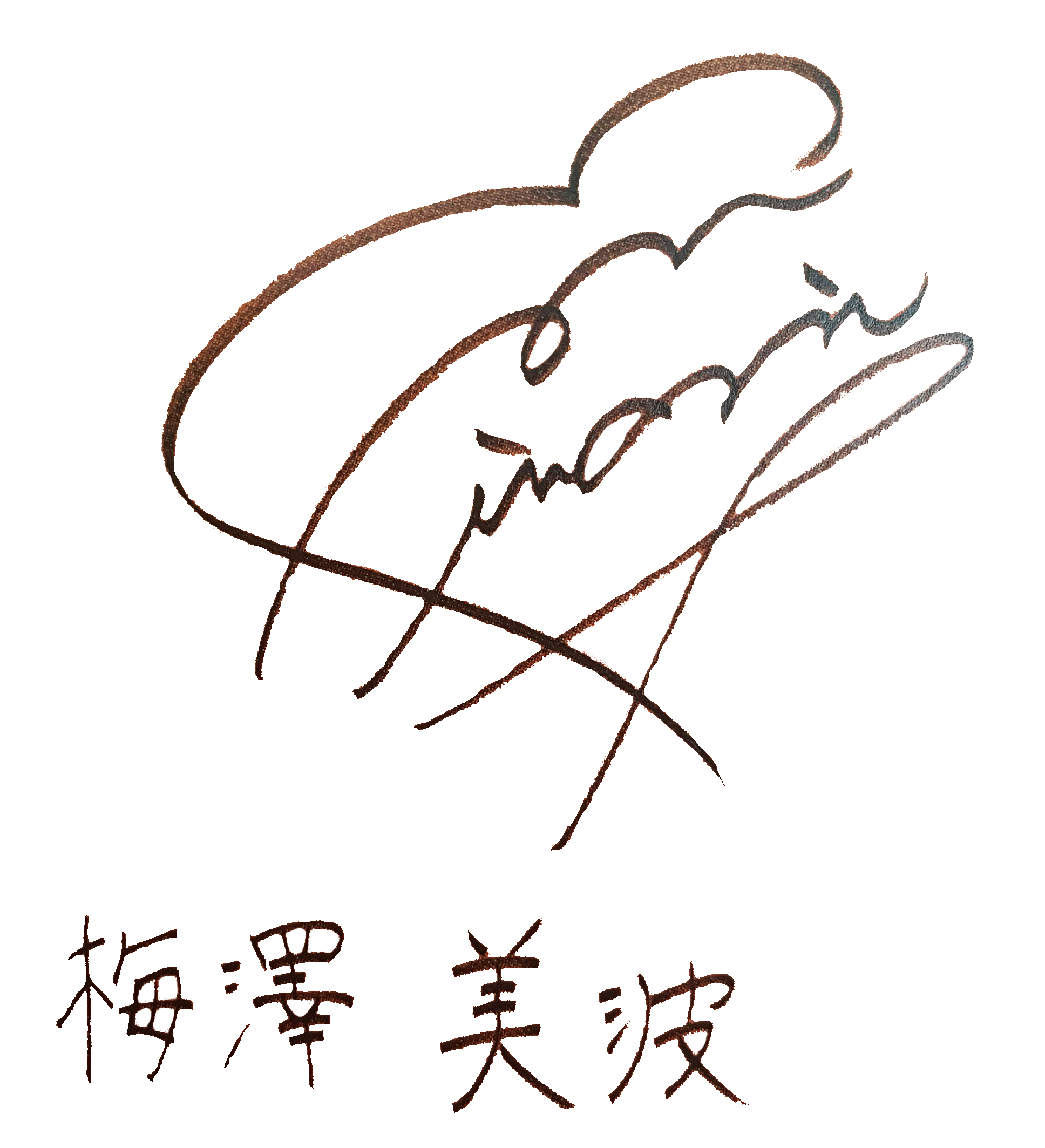

Minami Umezawa (Japanese: 梅澤 美波, romanized: Umezawa Minami; born January 6, 1999) is a Japanese singer, model and actress. She is a former third generation member and captain of the idol girl group Nogizaka46. She is also an exclusive model for the fashion magazine "with" and a regular model for "Classy".

== Early life and career ==
Umezawa was born on January 7, 1999 in Hiratsuka City, Kanagawa Prefecture. She has a younger brother seven years her junior.

On September 4, 2016, Umezawa successfully passed the audition for Nogizaka46's third generation. After the announcement of all the new third generation members, they were revealed on the "Nogizaka46 Third Generation Selection Special" live broadcast on LINE LIVE. On December 10, she made her first appearance to fans at the "Nogizaka46 Third Generation Meet and Greet" held at Nippon Budokan. On December 19, the official Nogizaka46 third generation blog was launched.

From February 2 to 12, 2017, the third generation members' first performance, "Three Principals," was held for fifteen shows. From May 9 to 14 of the same year, they appeared in the "Nogizaka46 Third Generation Solo Live," and held eight shows.

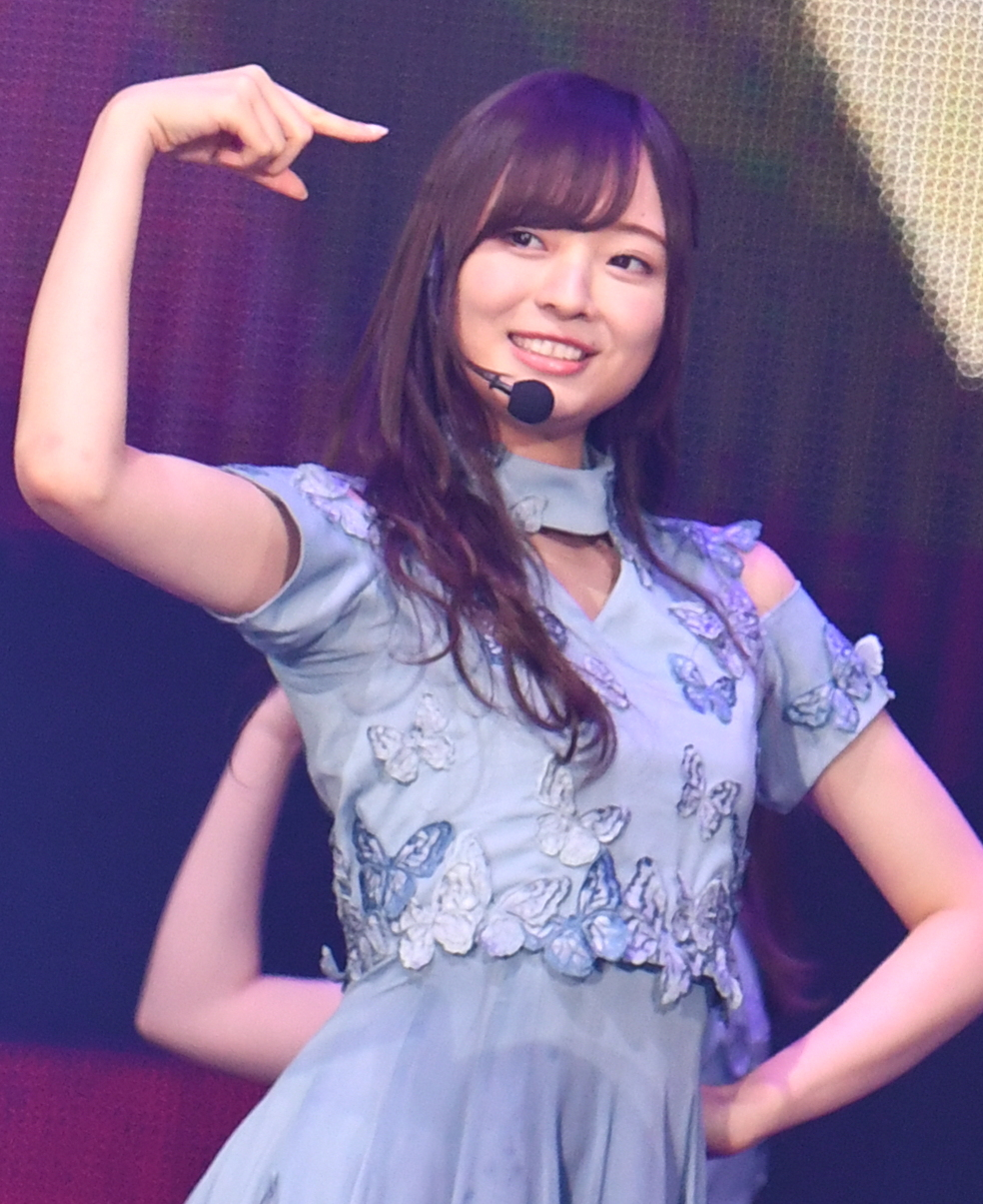
Umezawa at the 14th KKBOX Music awards in 2019, Taiwan

In the May 2018 issue of the information magazine Nikkei Entertainment!, Umezawa's column began its serialization, succeeding senior member Rina Ikoma, and was released on April 4, 2018. Then on April 3, She made her first solo stage appearance in the role of Elizabeth in the stage play The Seven Deadly Sins: The Stage, which began its performances on August 3. She also appeared as Sailor Jupiter in the Nogizaka46 version of the musical Pretty Guardian Sailor Moon, which ran from June 8 to 24 and from September 21 to 30 of the same year. On July 2, she was selected for the first time to perform in the 21st single "Jikochū de Ikō!". She also served as the center position for the first time for the song "Soratobira", which is included in the title song.

On September 29, 2020, Umezawa released her first photo book, "Near the Dream," published by Kodansha. On November 29, 2021, during an online mini-live, first generation senior member Manatsu Akimoto announced that Umezawa had been appointed as the group's "vice-captain" – this was the first time the vice-captain system had been introduced since the group's inception.

On February 22, 2023, at the Nogizaka46 11th founding anniversary live held at Yokohama Arena, it was announced that she would become the new designated "captain" of the girl group, succeeding Manatsu Akimoto.

At the "Nogizaka46 Thanksgiving Festival" held on December 14, 2024, Umezawa officially appointed fifth-generation member Satsuki Sugawara as the group's new "vice-captain". This means that when Umezawa graduates from Nogizaka46, Sugawara will automatically assume the role of "captain", leading the group by maintaining strong, positive relationships with members and providing encouragement during public appearances and similar events.

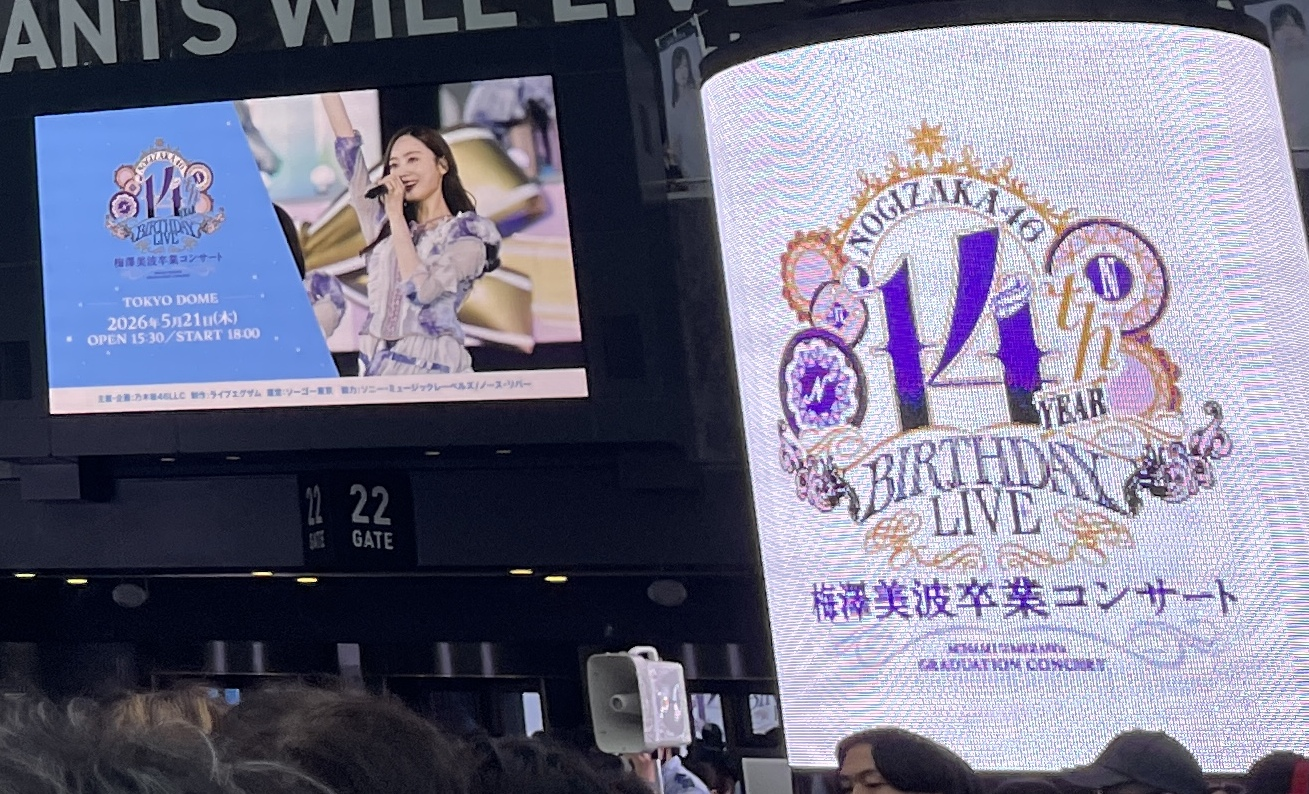
Umezawa at her graduation concert held in Tokyo Dome in May 2026

On February 3, 2026, her second photobook entitled "Transparent Resolve" was released. Then on February 25, Umezawa announced that she would be "graduating" from Nogizaka46 after their activities for the 41st single, "Saigo ni Kaidan o Kakenota no wa Itsuda?". She is scheduled to hold her graduation concert on the last day of their "14th Year Birthday Live". She officially graduated from the group on May 21.

== Filmography ==
=== Film ===
Year	Title	Role	Notes	Ref.
2020	Keep Your Hands Off Eizouken!: The Movie	Sayaka Kanamori		
2025	Kowloon Generic Romance	Yang Ming		

=== Television ===
Year	Title	Role	Notes	Ref.
2019	Zambi	Kana Kiuchi		
2020	Keep Your Hands Off Eizouken!	Sayaka Kanamori		
2023	Muscle Training Salaryman Nakayama Kintaro	Madoka Shibusawa		
2024	Waiting in the Death Game	Kazu Akizawa		
2026	Heartbreak Karuta	Chinami Natsuno		

== Stage ==
=== Theater ===
Year	Title	Role	Notes	Ref.
2018	Pretty Guardian Sailor Moon	Makoto Kino		
2018	The Seven Deadly Sins: The Stage	Elizabeth Liones		
2023	Kingdom	Yang Duan He		
2025	Itaewon Class: The Musical	Oh Soo-ah		
2026	Love Letters	Melissa		

== Bibliography ==
=== Magazine ===
- with (March 28, 2019, Kodansha) – Exclusive model
- Classy (April 28, 2024, Kobunsha) – Regular model

=== Photobook ===
- "Near the Dream" (September 29, 2020, Kodansha)
- "Transparent Resolve" (February 3, 2026, Kodansha)
