= Yacchatta!! =

Single by Busaiku

from the album Busaiku no, Wa!
- Released: March 8, 2015
- Genre: J-pop
- Length: 3:42
- Label: Avex trax
- Composers: Nakai-san, Miyashita Koumuten (Kouji Miyashita, Masaya Miyashita)
- Lyricists: Nakai-san, Miyashita Koumuten (Kouji Miyashita, Masaya Miyashita)
- Producer: Masahiro Nakai

Busaiku singles chronology
| "Ti Ti Ti Terette Teretititi (Dare no Ketsu)" (2014) | "Yacchatta!!" (2015) | "Michishirube" (2017) |

Music video
- "I goofed!!" on YouTube

"Yacchatta!!" (やっちゃった!!; lit. 'I goofed!!') is the third single by Busaiku, released on March 8, 2015 from Avex Trax. It was produced by Masahiro Nakai. The song was a commercial song for Kowa's "Cabbage Series" and was the first tie-up song for Busaiku.

== Overview ==
The first part of the song is inserted from a part of the second single, "Ti Ti Ti Terette Teretititi (Dare no Ketsu)". Like the previous song, this song was released on Sunday, but the next single, "Michishirube", written and composed by Busaiku, was released on Wednesday.

== Chart performance ==
On the Oricon Singles Daily Chart dated March 7, 2015, the song reached No. 1 with estimated sales of about 47,000 copies, but lost to AKB48's "Green Flash" (first) and Exile (Japanese band)'s "Jounetsu no Hana" (second) on the weekly chart, coming in at third.

As with the previous song, it failed to reach No. 1 on the weekly chart, so producer Masahiro Nakai gave it a second penalty game in the May 4, 2015 broadcast of Kiss My Busaiku! The second penalty game was given to the four members of the Busaiku (Kento Senga, Toshiya Miyata, Wataru Yokoo, and Takashi Nikaido), plus Hiromitsu Kitayama, another member of Kis-My-Ft2, for Parachuting in this work.
