= Michishirube =

Single by Busaiku

from the album Busaiku no, Wa!
- Released: January 4, 2017 (Japan)
- Genre: J-pop
- Label: Avex Trax
- Songwriter: Busaiku

Busaiku singles chronology
| "Yacchatta!!" (2015) | "Michishirube" (2017) |

Music video
- "Michishirube" on YouTube

"Michishirube" (道しるべ; lit. 'Signpost') is the fourth single by Busaiku, released on January 4, 2017, by Avex Trax.

== Overview ==
This is the first ballad by Busaiku, with lyrics written by Busaiku, and tells of "love" and "gratitude" to the people they love.

Masahiro Nakai, who had produced Busaiku up to the previous single, was not involved in this single, and Busaiku members spent ten days in a shared training camp, where they produced the music, designed the jackets, and conceived the music videos on their own.

The music video symbolizes the stage set on the roof of a department store that appeared in their debut single "Tana Kara Botamochi". The music video uses the same set that appeared in their debut single "Tana Kara Botamochi" as a symbol. The lyrics include a verse from the lyrics of the second single "Ti Ti Ti Terette Teretititi (Dare no Ketsu)" written by Nakai, "Panitan" from the same song, and peridot, Nakai's birthstone, as well as the hidden names of each member "1000" (1000 in Japanese "sen"): Kento Senga, "Wataru": Wataru Yokoo, "Nikai"(Twice): Takashi Nikaido, and "Miataranai"(not found): Toshiya Miyata).

== Chart performance ==
Sold 156,000 copies in its first week of release, surpassing "Tana Kara Botamochi"'s sales of 133,000 copies and setting a new record for a single, reaching No. 1 on the Oricon Weekly Chart dated January 16, becoming the fourth single to reach the top spot. (The previous three singles were released on Fridays and Sundays, which are generally not Wednesdays when CDs are released in Japan, and thus had poor sales growth.) It was also the 1,500th song to reach No. 1 in the 50-year history of Oricon.

On his radio program Nakai Masahiro On & On Air, Nakai aired "Michishirube" many times, saying, "It's never been No. 1 before, so why does it get to No. 1 as soon as I'm out? I think I'll make the fifth single next time. Darn it. If it comes in second or third, I'll admit that I have no taste". He is also self-deprecating.

Estimated sales: 181940 copies (Oricon, June 19, 2017)

== Contents ==
=== CD ===
1. "Michishirube" :Words and music by Busaiku; arrangers: Shingo Kubota and Satoru Kurihara
2. "Michishirube" (music box) :Music box version of this work. Included only on the regular edition.
3. "Michishirube" (karaoke)

=== DVD ===
==== First edition A ====
1. "Michishirube" (Music Video) (prologue, main part, epilogue)
2. "Michishirube" (Music Video) Making Documentary

==== First edition B ====
1. Busaiku 10-day camp Documentary (Enjoyed the camp with three members of Kis-My-Ft2 (Tamamori, Fujigaya, Kitayama) who happened to be there)
