= Dream Boy (musical) =

2004 Japanese musical

- Promotional poster 2024
- Book: Johnny Kitagawa
- Premiere: January 8, 2004; 21 years ago: Imperial Theatre, Tokyo
- Productions: 2004 Tokyo, Osaka; 2005 Osaka; 2006 Tokyo; 2008 Tokyo; 2009 Tokyo; 2011 Tokyo; 2012 Tokyo; 2013 Tokyo; 2014 Tokyo; 2015 Tokyo; 2016 Tokyo; 2018 Tokyo; 2019 Tokyo; 2020-2021 Tokyo; 2021 Tokyo; 2022 Tokyo; 2023 Tokyo; 2024 Tokyo

Dream Boy or Dream Boys (abbreviated as Doribo) is a Japanese musical production. It features many performers from Johnny & Associates and was first performed in January 2004 as Magical Musical Dream Boy starring Hideaki Takizawa, and has been performed again with repeated cast and content changes. (Note: On the other hand, the performers themselves sometimes state that "this is not a so-called re-enactment," and that "the cast and the tricks change every time.") It is a story of "boys' dreams, setbacks, and friendship," interwoven with boxing, flying direction, comedy, and improvisation. It was written, composed, and directed by Johnny Kitagawa; Koichi Domoto has directed the show since Kitagawa's death in 2019.

== Story ==
The story of Dream Boy has varied over the years, with multiple changes to the script and score. The 2004 and 2005 productions were stories "about the world of boxing", an element that has been carried over into the majority of later productions. In 2006, in addition to the boxing storyline, a new heart transplantation storyline was added, and further inspiration was drawn from West Side Story with a new conflict between the East and West.

In 2007, Johnny Kitagawa rewrote the show again, now featuring three main characters: the protagonist, his rival, and his best friend. The 2007 rewrites feature the drama of the main character killing a boxing champion, and his interactions with the champion's sick brother.

By 2009, another storyline was added in that the main three characters are former members of the same idol group, which was carried over into the 2011 production. The rival remains a boxing champion, while the best friend becomes a musician.

=== 2006 ===
Yokoyama, a movie producer, selects Kazuya to play the lead role in a film about the life of legendary boxer Subaru. However, Subaru and his friends (Kanjani Eight) do not take kindly to Kazuya and his friends (KAT-TUN) and violently oppose them. Subaru and Kamenashi decide to settle their differences in the ring, but what awaits them is a tragedy.

=== 2011 ===
The story follows three people after the breakup of their idol group, who are each involved in a boxing movie as a lead actor, a model athlete, and the theme song writer.

=== 2016 ===
Act 1

The three friends talked about their dreams when they were young, but now have a strained relationship. Yuta quits boxing just before his rookie championship match, but he wants big money and gets a job starring in a movie through Toshiya, who has become a music producer. The fact that it is a boxing movie antagonizes Kent, the champ, and the two box over the shoot. Kent's skull is cracked, his condition deteriorates, and he is hit by a straight right hand from Yuta and falls in the ring. The match seemed to be decided, but Sanada finds a lead plate in Yuta's glove. Kent is rushed to the hospital, and Yuta is framed for a crime he did not commit. Yuta goes into hiding with his madam, the president of a film production company. However, Yasuyi comes to take revenge with a knife, and after a struggle with Kaito, who stops him, Yasuyi stabs himself and falls to the ground. As the police arrive on the scene, Yuta escapes, protecting Kaito, who is holding the knife. Kaito collapses in agony, and Toshiya suspects Yuta and despises him. However, Yuta's desire for a large sum of money is to pay for Kaito's heart surgery, as he loves Kaito like his own brother.

Act 2

While Yuta is on the run, Kaito, who has been performing as one of the "Jet Boys," suffers a seizure on a singing show and is reunited with Kent, who is in the hospital. Kent, who believes in Yuta's innocence, is moved by Kaito's confession of the knife incident. Kent entrusts the Champion's Glove to Kaito and decides to get to the bottom of the matter. Meanwhile, Yuta discovers that the mother who abandoned him as a child was Madame, and that the mother who abandoned the young Kaito was Rika. The lives of both sons were ruined by the feud between the two mothers. When Yuta angrily confronts Rika the truth, she realizes that she has been trying to destroy her own son, Kaito, and her son's benefactor, Yuta, out of hatred for the madam, and she regrets it terribly. Yasuyi and Kent appear at their doorstep, where they reveal that the knife incident was an accident, and that the lead in the glove was Sanada's madness under Rika's direction, and Yuta is finally cleared of suspicion. Yuta returns to tell Kaito that his heart surgery was a success, and the two sets of parents and children are reconciled.

The misunderstanding is cleared up, and the three sing together on a park bench, just as they did when they were children. While Yuta talks about his boxing dream and Toshiya talks about his show business dream, Kent remains motionless and they take care of him. Yuta and Kaito continued to box with Kent in their hearts after he dies

== Production history ==
=== 2004 ===
The first performance at Imperial Theatre starred 21-year-old Hideaki Takizawa. The show's music and theme, "Dream Maker" was composed by Koichi Domoto. Takizawa plays the role of a world boxing champion. During the performance, Takizawa bungee jumped from a height of 15 meters.

The original plan was for a total of 36 performances from January 8 to 31, 2004, attracting 66,000 people, but due to the many requests for tickets, the theater held its first morning performance and three performances a day (additional performances were held for 5 days), and attracted about 75,000 people over their 41 performances. It was announced at the final performance that the show would be performed again in May of the same year.

The first revival of the play was performed at the Umeda Koma Theatre from April 30 to May 23, 2004 for a total of 36 performances. Hideaki Takizawa became the theater's youngest chairperson. The first 14 performances from April 30-May 7, in which Takizawa was not participating due to a concert, starred KAT-TUN and Kanjani Eight; the remaining 22 performances from May 8-May 23, starred Takizawa. The production saw a total attendance of 76,200 people.

==== 2004 casts ====
Role	January 2004	April–May 2004
Actor	Hideaki Takizawa	Hideaki Takizawa (May 8-May 23)
Champ	Yasuei Yakushiji	Yasuei Yakushiji
KAT-TUN	Jin Akanishi; Kazuya Kamenashi; Yuichi Nakamaru; Junnosuke Taguchi; Koki Tanaka; Tatsuya Ueda	Jin Akanishi; Kazuya Kamenashi; Yuichi Nakamaru; Koki Tanaka; Tatsuya Ueda
Kanjani Eight	Ryuhei Maruyama; Shingo Murakami; Tadayoshi Okura; Subaru Shibutani; Shota Yasuda; You Yokoyama	
A.B.C.	A.B.C.	A.B.C. (May 8-May 23) (Note: Ryoichi Tsukada will not appear due to a foot injury. 。Terufumi Kiriyama performed as a substitute when Ikuto Kawai was absent for a few days.)
Boys in wheelchairs	Kei Inoo; Yuta Tamamori	
Others	Daiki Arioka; Taisuke Fujigaya; Hiromitsu Kitayama; Toshiya Miyata Tsubasa Makoto; Kohei Matsumoto; Takashi Nikaido Kento Senga; Yuya Takaki; Kota Yabu; Wataru Yokoo	Tomohiro Kamiyama; Akito Kiriyama; Junta Nakama; Honoka Suzuki; Yuya Takaki; Kota Yabu

=== Hey! Say! Dream Boy (2005) ===
Performed at Umeda Arts Theatre from April 27 to May 15, 2005. 37 performances with 70,000 people in attendance. The 2005 production starred KAT-TUN and Kanjani Eight. The show featured "flying," in which the performers flew above the audience.

Jin Akanishi did not participate, but made a surprise appearance at the park scene only at the final performance, playing the senior role of Kazuya, which was normally played by Kamenashi.

==== Cast ====
- KAT-TUN
  - Kazuya (Kazuya Kamenashi): martial arts fighter
  - Junnosuke Taguchi
  - Koki Tanaka
  - Tatsuya Ueda
  - Yuichi Nakamaru
- Kanjani Eight
  - Subaru (Subaru Shibutani) former street fighter
  - Ryo Nishikido, Ryuhei Maruyama, Shota Yasuda, Tadayoshi Okura, You Yokoyama, Hiroki Uchi
- Tomohiro Kamiyama: Subaru's younger brother. Akito Kiriyama, Junta Nakama, Takahiro Hamada.

=== 2006 ===
Starring KAT-TUN and Kanjani Eight, ed by Subaru Shibutani, it was performed at Imperial Theatre from January 3 to 29, 2006, for a total of 38 performances, drawing 70,72 audiences.

The circus scene in the first act featured a tightrope walker suspended in midair, Kamenashi flying 15 meters in the air, Junnosuke Taguchi's lat technique, and A.B.C.'s aerial performance. In addition, Tanaka and Nakamaru dressed as clowns and brought audience members up to the stage, and J.J. Express and other trainee tap danced. The "Small but BIG 4," a four-member group formed by Yuto Nakajima (acting), Joey Tee (dancing), Yasumasa Gotoh (violin), and Mao Tommy (baton), each with specialized skills, appeared as a group of specialists in the play. In the second act, Kazuya used a 16.2m x 7.2m vision, the largest in the theater's history, to perform spider flying, running around the wall with his body tilted to the side, suspended in the middle of the screen.

The play featured an arrangement of "Challenger" by Johnny & Associates's star Masahiko Kondo, and songs by KAT-TUN and Kanjani Eight were sung following the performance. During a press conference on January 8, it was announced that the play would be performed again the following year, which the performers had not been informed of.

==== Cast ====
- KAT-TUN
  - Kazuya (Kazuya Kamenashi) Childhood friend of Jin and Ryo. He is becoming blind due to the aftereffects of a disease.
  - Kouki (Koki Tanaka): He owes money to a movie company to protect the team.
  - Jin Akanishi (Jin Akanishi): Childhood friend of Kazuya and Ryo
  - Junnosuke Taguchi, Tatsuya Ueda, Yuichi Nakamaru
- Kanjani Eight
  - Subaru (Subaru Shibutani): Legendary champ and Yuta's older brother. He is suffering from aftereffects of the injury he received in a match.
  - Yokoyama (You Yokoyama) Film producer
  - Ryo (Ryo Nishikido) (Note: Ryo Nishikido will appear on the 12th. Shota Totsuka filled in for him during that time.): Childhood friend of Kazuya and Jin
  - Shingo Murakami, Ryuhei Maruyama, Shota Yasuda, Tadayoshi Okura
- A.B.C.
  - Shota Totsuka, Fumito Kawai, Koichi Goseki, Ryouichi Tsukada
- Small but BIG 4
  - Yuta (Yuto Nakajima): A boy with a serious illness
  - Joey T.
  - Tommy Mao
  - Yasukan Goto
- Hiromitsu Kitayama, Kyohei Iida, Kento Senga, Toshiya Miyata, Wataru Yokoo, Taisuke Fujigaya, Yuta Tamamori, Takashi Nikaido, Daiki Arioka, Kei Inoo, Ryosuke Yamada, Yuya Takaki, Ryosuke Hashimoto, Ryutaro Morimoto

=== 2007 ===
The main cast consisted of Kazuya Kamenashi, Koki Tanaka, and Tomoyuki Yara, and was performed at Imperial Theatre from September 5 to September 30, 2007. A total of 70,000 people attended the 38 performances. It was decided at the beginning of the run that the show would be repeated in March of the following year. Kamenashi showed aerial performances such as trapeze, wall flying, and a high-speed 20-turn.

==== Cast ====
- Kazuya - Kazuya Kamenashi (Kat-Tun): Protagonist
- Kouki - Koki Tanaka (Kat-Tun): The champ. Legendary boxer and rival of the main character.
- Yara - Tomoyuki Yara (M.A.): Friend of the main character
- A.B.C. Koichi Goseki, Shota Totsuka, Fumito Kawai, Ryouichi Tsukada
- Kis-My-Ft2 Hiromitsu Kitayama, Wataru Yokoo, Taisuke Fujigaya, Toshiya Miyata, Yuta Tamamori, Takashi Nikaido, Kento Senga
- Producer: Tsubasa Makoto
- Madame: Maeda Bibari
- Yuki - Shintaro Morimoto, Ryutaro Morimoto, Taiga Kyomoto (triple cast)

=== 2008 ===
Starring Kazuya Kamenashi, it was performed at the Imperial Theatre from March 4 to March 30, 2008, and at the Umeda Arts Theatre Main Hall from April 4 to April 16, 2008. 200 performances in total were achieved at the evening performance on March 8. The main cast for the Imperial Theatre performance was Koki Tanaka and Kota Yabu, and Daichi Nakata joined the cast for the Osaka performance. Kamenashi played the role of a boxer following his role in the TV drama The Gospel of One Pound at the same time. He had to remake all 23 of his costumes because his body had grown by one size.

The traditional tightrope walking, trapeze, and flying performances were greatly increased to 20 minutes in the air, and a video projector was introduced.

==== Cast ====
Role	Tokyo 2008	Osaka 2008	Notes	Ref
Kazuya	Kazuya Kamenashi	Kazuya Kamenashi		
Koki	Koki Tanaka	Koki Tanaka		
Yabu	Kota Yabu	Kota Yabu	Only appeared for the April 8 - April 12 Osaka performances;	
Yuki	Shintaro Morimoto Taiga Kyomoto Miyuto Morita (daily)	Miyuto Morita Joichiro Fujiwara (alternating)		
	Ran Ohtori	Ran Ohtori		
Daichi		Daichi Nakata		
A.B.C.	Goseki Koichi Totsuka Shota, Kawai Ikuto Tsukada Ryouichi	Ryouichi Tsukada Koichi Goseki		
Kis-My-Ft2	Hiromitsu Kitayama Wataru Yokoo Taisuke Fujigaya Toshiya Miyata Kento Senga Yuta Tamamori Takashi Nikaido	Yuta Tamamori Toshiya Miyata Takashi Nikaido Kento Senga Wataru Yokoo		
Boys		Ryuta Muro Kota Yamazaki Takahiro Hamada Tomohiro Kamiyama Ryota Senzaki		
Others	Ryohei Abe Tatsuya Fukazawa Hikaru Iwamoto Tsubasa Makoto Ryota Miyadate Daisuke Sakuma Shota Watanabe	Naoka Iori		

==== Characters ====
- Kazuya: Protagonist. Boxer
- Koki
- Yabu: Kazuya and Koki's childhood friend
- Yuki: Champ's younger brother
- Daichi: Kazuya and Koki's childhood friend

=== 2009 ===
Starring Kazuya Kamenashi. The main cast includes Yuya Tegoshi and Subaru Shibutani. The first 38 performances were held at Imperial Theatre from September 4 to September 29, 2009, and 21 later performances were held at the Umeda Arts Theater Main Hall from October 13 to October 25, 2009.

Kamenashi played the main character, Shibuya the champ, and Tekoshi, in his first attempt at a musical, took on the role of a musician. Kamenashi also participated in the casting meeting, and Shibuya and Tegoshi were cast in order to emphasize the musical aspect of this production. 8 songs in the play, including Kamenashi's solo song "I Love You," were newly written. Shibuya and Togoshi were involved in the musical side of the production, and while the content and chords for "Come Into My World" were decided, audiences were invited to sing freely, so the lyrics were sung differently for each performance. In terms of the production, Kamenashi broke his own record by flying for 24 minutes in the air. Also, the "Frame Flying," in which the dancers walked on the inner frame of a picture frame measuring 6.7 m (length) x 8.4 m (width), made its first appearance.。

==== Cast ====
- Kazuya - Kazuya Kamenashi: The main character. Former member of a popular idol group.
- Subaru - Shibuya Subaru: The champ. Former member of a popular idol group.
- Yuya - Yuya Tegoshi: Musician. Former member of a popular idol group.
- Makoto Tsubasa
- Sasari Mine
- A.B.C-Z
  - Koichi Goseki, Shota Totsuka, Ikuto Kawai, Ryouichi Tsukada, Ryosuke Hashimoto
- Mis Snow Man
  - Hikaru Iwamoto, Tatsuya Fukasawa, Shota Watanabe, Ryohei Abe, Ryota Miyadate, Daisuke Sakuma Yasumasa Goto, Daisuke Ishigaki, Takayuki Konno

=== 2011 ===
The 2011 production, starring Kazuya Kamenashi, was one of the Imperial Theatre 100th anniversary performances, and the first performance of the work in two years. Ot was performed from September 3 to 25, 2011, and the work reached a total of 350 performances during this run. All three main cast members were members of KAT-TUN, and they called themselves "Katsun (luck at winning)" for this stage only. This name was given by Johnny Kitagawa in reference to recovery efforts of the 2011 Tōhoku earthquake and tsunami that occurred in March of the same year.

In this work, various confrontations will take place under the theme of "10 Battles". These include a boxing match between Kamenashi and Koki Tanaka, a rap and voice percussion match between Tanaka and Nakamaru, a "former Takarazuka showdown" between Ran Ohtori and Tsubasa Makoto, and a "brother showdown" between Koki Tanaka and Juri Tanaka. Kamenashi learned and performed a new flying technique, "Kensho Koshin Mai Kuu Daiten," incorporating bungee jumping, in about 20 days with an invited acrobatic troupe from China. Due to the earthquake and tsunami, flying over the audience was restricted.

==== Cast ====
- Kazuya (Kazuya Kamenashi): Former member of a popular idol group. After the breakup of the group, he loses sight of his goal and lives a freewheeling life.
- Koki (Koki Tanaka): Former member of a popular idol group. After the breakup of the group, he becomes a boxing champ.
- Yuichi Nakamaru (Yuichi Nakamaru): Former member of a popular idol group. After the breakup of the group, he aspires to become a world-famous musician, but his aspirations are futile. He is the key person who brings Kazuya and Champ together.
- Makoto (Tsubasa Makoto)
- Ran (Ran Ohtori)
- Snow Man
  - Hikaru Iwamoto, Tatsuya Fukazawa, Shota Watanabe, Ryota Miyadate, Daisuke Sakuma
- Juri (Juri Tanaka): Koki's younger brother

=== 2012 ===
Starring Kazuya Kamenashi, the show was performed at the Imperial Theatre from September 3 to 29, 2012. Of the show's 150 minute runtime, 24 minutes were spent flying above the audience. Kamenashi was called "the most down-to-earth entertainer in Japan".

For this production, Kamenashi was involved in the design of the posters and flyers, and also participated in discussions about the cast with Johnny Kitagawa. Kamenashi was the oldest male performer in this production. In the past, the role of the champ had been played by a senior actor. Yuta Tamamori, who played Champ in the production, said that his role was "out of character" and that he was conscious of being "an ordinary person," in contrast to other interpretations of Champ. The story was renewed with the theme of "kizuna" (bonds). In the opening scene, in particular, the central characters wear the school run to more clearly depict their past.

==== Cast ====
- Kazuya (Kazuya Kamenashi): Protagonist
- Tamamori (Yuta Tamamori): Champ
- Yaotome Hikaru
- Kento Senga
- Toshiya Miyata
- Snow Man
  - Tatsuya Fukazawa, Daisuke Sakuma, Shota Watanabe, Ryota Miyadate, Teru Iwamoto, Ryohei Abe
- Ran Ohtori
- Sakiho Juri

=== Dream Boys Jet (2013) ===
Starring a new actor, Yuta Tamamori, it was performed at the Imperial Theatre from September 5 to 29, 2013. The title "JET" stands for "fast and furious" or "dynamic", and the story has been changed from a traditional boxing story to a story about a Formula One racer, inspired by TV personality and racer, Masahiko Kondo. According to Kondo, Johnny was probably trying to depict "a drama of people risking life and death," and called him several times to persuade him to appear in the show. Kondo told him that if the show was going to be based on motorsports, he wanted it to be "something that conveys friendship, conflict, and tenderness between men" rather than the "glamorous show" often seen in Japanese stage shows, and Johnny quickly finished the script, Kondo supervised the race scene and appeared in the musical, the first time he had done so in 24 years. Many of Kondo's songs are sung in the play, and "Challenger" was also sung in this production, with the lyrics rewritten as a racer's story.

In this production, scenes were adapted to address accidents during the race. The race scenes used images on LED screens, which Kondo wanted to "convey the fear of life and death". Kondo Racing and Japan Race Promotion cooperated to allow the crew to use a car on stage that was used in an actual race. Casting similar to the 2011 production, with Tamamori playing the main character involved in the case, Kento Senga playing the top racer, Toshiya Miyata playing his friend, and Kondo playing the owner of the racing team. Kondo played the role of "Champ", who is the model in the film, and Senga's role as the protagonist's rival is based on his complex toward the protagonist.

=== Cast ===
- Tamamori - Yuta Tamamori: protagonist. Actor.
- Senga - Kento Senga: top racer.
- Miyata - Toshiya Miyata: friend of the two. Mechanic.
- Madame: Ran Ohtori
- Masahiko- Masahiko Kondo (special appearance): owner
- Snow Man
  - Tatsuya Fukazawa, Ryota Miyadate, Daisuke Sakuma, Shota Watanabe, Hikaru Iwamoto, Ryohei Abe
- Ryota Moritsugu, Yoshitaka Hara, Reia Nakamura, Wataru Vasayega, Rikuto Tomita, Satoru Hanzawa, Takayoshi Kishi, Katsutaro Uehara, Takuto Teranishi, Yosei Kaneda, Ryo Masuda, Renon Hayashi, Iku Kuramoto, Shogo Tajima, Yusheng Tsunoda, Yasukan Goto, Daisuke Ishigaki, Yu Ogawa, Mizuki Kobayashi, Yuta Jinguji, Ren Meguro

=== 2014 - 2015 ===
2014 marked the 10th anniversary of the first performance. Starring Yuta Tamamori, it was staged at the Imperial Theatre from September 4–30, 2014. The stage returned to the world of boxing and entertainment as before, and its production announcement was held in the ring of Korakuen Hall, "the sacred place of martial arts," with about 1,000 fans.

Additional elements were added to the storyline, including a scene when Toshiya (played by Miyata) accidentally stabs Hikaru Iwamoto (played by Hikaru Iwamoto). The roles of the main character was played by Tamamori, Kento Senga as Champ, and Toshiya Miyata as the idol group's producer, but new cast members also appeared in various parts, such as Sho Hirano as Champ's brother who hates his brother and Ren Nagase as the informer who is forced to work for Madam and Rika. The opening scene featured a performance by Kis-My-Mystery Orchestra (Kis-My-My-Mystery). In the opening scene, the three members of Kis-My-Ft2 held hands and performed flying, and Tamamori also challenged "Tama Hula," a hula hoop flying performance named after himself in the play. In addition, a new song, "The Dream Boys", was performed by Shiyoh Hirano, Ren Nagase, and Kaito Takahashi.

The 2015 production starred a double cast of Yuta Tamamori (September 3–10, 15 - 16, 22 - 30) and Yuma Nakayama (September 12–14, 18 - 20). The Tamamori version features Kento Senga and Toshiya Miyata, and the Nakayama version features Fuma Kikuchi and Marius Yo as the main actors, with Tamamori and Nakayama playing a young man who has quit boxing, Senga and Kikuchi as boxing champions, and Miyata and Marius as their friends. This was the first time that the three members of Nakayama's version appeared in "Dream Boys".

In order for the audience to see the "theatrical" part of this production, the storyline was "stripped down to the bare essentials" and the roles were reduced to the necessary ones. The basic script is the same for both productions, but the music and direction are different. Tamamori performed a new technique called "Tama-nobori(Tamamori climbing)" following the previous year's flying "Tama-hula(Tamamori flying)". Nakayama performed "Yuumaru", a trapeze-like flying named after himself.

==== Casts ====
Role	2014 cast	2015 Tamamori cast	2015 Nakayama cast
Yuta/Yima	Yuta Tamamori	Yuta Tamamori	Yuma Nakayama
Kento/Fuma	Kento Senga	Kento Senga	Fuma Kikuchi
Toshiya/Marius	Toshiya Miyata	Toshiya Miyata	Marius Yo
Kaito/Yuki	Kaito Takahashi	Koki Kawasaki	
Sho (2014)	Sho Hirano	n/a	n/a
Madame	Ran Ohtori	Ran Ohtori	Ran Ohtori
Rika	Jun Shibuki	Jun Shibuki	Jun Shibuki
Ren (2014)	Ren Nagase	n/a	n/a
Yasui	n/a	Kentaro Yasui	
Sanada	n/a	Yuma Sanada	
Hagiya	n/a	Keigo Hagiya	
Morita	n/a	Morita Miyuto	
Iwamoto/Yamamoto	Teru Iwamoto	Ryota Yamamoto	
Others	Takuto Teranishi; Ryo Masuda; Satoru Hanzawa; Anderson Casey Takashi; Ryota Moritsugu; Rin Takahashi; Reo Nagatsuma; Koki Maeda	They Budo, Ryo Masuda, Satoru Hanzawa	
Snow Man (2014)	Abe Ryohei; Shota Watanabe; Daisuke Sakuma; Ryota Miyadate; Tatsuya Fukazawa		

Characters Source

- Yuta/Yuma: a young man who quit boxing and (in the 2014 production) a former idol
- Kento/Fuma: a boxing champion and (in the 2014 production) a former idol
- Toshiya/Marius: friend and junior of the two.
- Sho (2014): Kento's younger brother. Member of an idol unit. He hates his brother who is obsessed with boxing and doesn't pay attention to him
- Kaito/Yuki: Yuta/Yuma's younger brother. Has a heart condition.
- Madame:
- Rika:
- Ren (2014): A member of an idol unit. He is used as an informant by Madame and Rika
- Yasui: vocalist of a music unit.
- Sanada: Guitarist of the music unit.
- Hagiya: drummer of the music unit.
- Morita: bass guitarist of the music unit.
- Iwamoto/Yamamoto: stabbing victim
- Snow Man (2014)
  - Abe Ryohei: Manager of an idol unit
  - Shota Watanabe, Daisuke Sakuma, Ryota Miyadate: Kento's friends
  - Fucca - Tatsuya Fukazawa: fixer who whispers evil things to Rika

=== 2016 ===
Starring Yuta Tamamori. The show ran from September 3 to September 30 with a total of 38 performances. At the 539th performance, the total number of audiences since the first performance exceeded 1 million.

In this production, a new "Dream Boys Suite" consisting of five songs of about seven minutes with themes such as "Family," "Friendship," "Bonds," and "Pledge to the Future", was performed just before the last scene. The final scene is tragic, in contrast to the traditional happy ending and from the tragic scenes in the Imperial Theatre productions directed by Johnny Kitagawa. "Challenger" was sung as the ending song.

Tamamori, the chairperson who had refined the story the previous year, wanted to further refine the play in this production, respecting the traditional "handing over the champ's heart" scene, but also wanting to take the play "in a more realistic, humanistic, and realistic direction". Therefore, when Johnny Kitagawa proposed a change to the last scene in which "Champ dies in the arms of the main character," the main cast and others reconsidered the entire structure of the story from scratch. The "conflict between best friends" was made clearer by the childhood of the three main characters depicted at the beginning of the story and the scene in which the three regain their bond at the end of the story.

Along with the story revision, the characterization of the roles was also changed. The character of Champ, played by Senga, is "hotter" and more "human" than before, and plays the role of defaming the protagonist. Miyata's role has also undergone the most significant character change: previously, his role was to believe in the protagonist and the champ, to keep them close, and to be comedic relief; in the 2016 production, he is plunged into doubt. This served to increase the presence of each character.

Tamamori wanted to impress the audience with the "theatrical" aspect of this work, which has traditionally been mostly evaluated in terms of performance. For this reason, he was initially opposed to the suite proposed by Johnny Kitagawa. However, Tamamori recalls that by actually working on the suite, he was able to feel the "musical-like" quality of expressing emotions through song and dance rather than dialogue.

As other performers, Kaito Takahashi of Mr. KING, Ryo Hashimoto, Mizuki Inoue, Soya Igari, and Yuto Takahashi of HiHi Jet, who were noted for their dancing, singing, and roller skating, were gathered to form "Johnnys'5," a limited time unit named after the "Jackson 5" by Johnny Kitagawa. They played the role of Miyata in the play. They appeared in the play as "Jet Boys," a group created by a music producer played by Miyata, and performed a newly written song, "Welcome To My Home Town".

The DVD "Dream Boys" was released on September 13, 2017, selling 62,000 copies in its first week.

==== Cast ====
- Yuta - Yuta Tamamori: Main character
- Kent - Kento Senga: Champ.
- Toshiya - Toshiya Miyata: music producer.
- Jet Boys - Johnnys'5: Idol Unit
- Kaito - Kaito Takahashi: Yuta's younger brother.
- Ryo Hashimoto, Mizuki Inoue, Soya Igari, Takahashi Yuto
- Love-tune.
  - Sanada - Yuma Sanada: key man of evil.
  - Yasui - Kentaro Yasui: Champ's crony. Stabbed with a knife .
  - Reo Nagatsuma, Shoki Morohoshi, Keigo Hagiya, Miyuto Morita, Akira Abe: cronies of Champ.
- Madame Ran- Ran Ohtori: president of a show business production company.
- Rika - Jun Shibuki: Ran's subordinate

=== 2018 ===
Starring Yuta Tamamori. It ran from September 6–30, 2018 and was the first production in two years. The five members of HiHi Jets appear in this production for the first time as a group. They play new characters, boys (Lost Boys) who are abandoned by their parents but live in "Dreamland." The story depicts "adult male friendship" by Tamamori, Senga, and Miyata, and "friendship among boys in the future" by HiHi Jets.

Tamamori performed the acrobatics "Rolling Tama (Rolling Balls)" using a trapeze box with a diameter of 6 meters. In addition to the familiar songs "The Dream Boys," "Challenger," and "Next Dream," the theme song "Dreamer" was performed at the opening and ending of the show, and the roller skating and skateboarding duel between HiHi Jets and 7 Men Samurai, "Fight All Night vs. Night vs All Of Me For You".

==== Cast ====
- Yuta - Yuta Tamamori: A young man who has quit boxing. He was abandoned by his parents when he was a child, and runs after money for his younger brother's heart transplant.
- Kento - Kento Senga: Boxing champ. He lost his parents in an accident in his childhood.
- Toshiya - Toshiya Miyata: Yuta and Kent's best friend. He abandoned his parents and left home, and the three of them founded "Dreamland" to save children without parents. In order to raise money, they plan to shoot a movie.
- HiHi Jets
  - Yuto - Yuto Takahashi: Yuta's younger brother. 18 years old. Has a heart disease.
  - Souya - Souya Inokari: A boy who wants to go sailing. He admires Toshiya; he is isolated among the five and has a strong desire to leave Dreamland as soon as possible and become independent.
  - Ryuto - Sakuma Ryuto: A boy who loves making things.
  - Mizuki Inoue: A boy who likes singing and stars.
  - Ryo Hashimoto: The leader of the five. A mischievous boy.
- 7 Men Samurai.
  - Sugeta - Rinne Sugata: Boxer at Champ Gym.
  - Reia Nakamura, Hiromitsu Sasaki, Katsuki Mototaka, Reo Igarashi, Daiki Konno: boxers at Champ Gym.
- Rika - Jun Shibuki.
- Madame - Ran Ohtori

=== 2019 ===
The show ran from September 3, 2019 - September 27, 2019, reaching a total of 600 performances on September 21, and 609 at the final performance. The lead actor is Yuta Kishi, who becomes the fourth chairperson following Takizawa, Kamenashi, and Tamamori. Although Johnny Kitagawa died on July 9, before the show began, casting had already been done, with Jinguji and Kishi being asked to appear in March and April, respectively, and meetings were held on June 16, two days before Johnny collapsed from a subarachnoid hemorrhage caused by a ruptured cerebral aneurysm. The meeting was held on June 16, two days before Johnny collapsed from a subarachnoid hemorrhage caused by a dissecting cerebral aneurysm. The writer, composer, and director remained "Johnny Kitagawa". Hideaki Takizawa, who took the lead and served as assistant director, asked Koichi Domoto for acting guidance and Koichi was also involved in reworking the script and composition, thus realizing a team effort that he had been eagerly waiting for a couple of years in terms of direction. The production also incorporated the opinions of Johnny before his death, and the song "Dream Boy" composed by Koichi, which Takizawa performed in the play in 2004, was revived for the first time in 15 years, this time with Koichi's singing voice. Kishi, who plays the leading role, also worked hard at training at the gym with Jinguji to improve his body, and perfected the "Kishi Kaku," an acrobatic technique of flying while manipulating a giant 1.5 meter square cube, which was a favorite of Janney before his death, and performed it in the climactic scene in the first act.

==== Cast ====
- Yuta - Yuta Kishi: protagonist. He grew up in an institution. He starts boxing after being invited by Jin, and fights Jin in a rookie championship match, but abandons during the fight.
- Jin - Yuta Jinguji: Champ and best friend.
- HiHi Jets.
  - Yuto - Yuto Takahashi: Yuta's younger brother; rescued by Yuta in a fire at a facility 17 years ago.
  - Mizuki - Mizuki Inoue: He is very considerate of the members and is most worried about Youta.
  - Ryo Hashimoto[note 15], Ryuto Sakuma.
  - Soya Igari: He is asked by the madam to find out why Yuta was chosen to play the leading role in the movie.
- Bi Shonen.
  - Taisho - Taisho Iwasaki: Champ's number one disciple. He also narrates the relationship between Yuta and Jin at the beginning.
  - Ryuga - Ryuga Sato: Accidentally stabbed.
  - Naoki Fujii.
- 7 Men Samurai
  - Reia Nakamura, Daiko Sasaki.
- Rika - Jun Shibuki.
- Madame - Ran Ohtori

=== 2020 - 2021 ===
The show ran from December 10, 2020 to January 27, 2021. The show was originally scheduled to run in September as usual, but was temporarily cancelled due to the COVID-19 pandemic. The Imperial Theatre had been staging the Johnny's Island series during the year-end and New Year holidays in recent years, but since there were approximately 80 performers, Toho, the production company, found it difficult to take all possible measures against infectious diseases, and this production, with a total cast of around 30 people, was chosen as the best choice. Yuta Kishi will continue to chair the production as he did last year. Also, starting this year, Johnny Kitagawa is credited as Eternal Producer, and Koichi Domoto, who was involved in the production as assistant director last year, is officially credited as director.

In order to prevent infection, the interval was eliminated, and the structure was changed to one act, two hours non-stop. The musical elements became stronger, and more emphasis was placed on the characters and their emotional expressions. New songs "Start Shooting," "Fate's Door," and "Fighter" were added, and in the scene where the main character Yuta escapes alone to find out the truth behind the incident, a new technique called "Rikishi," in which he climbs a rope up to 6 meters high using only his own arm strength, was performed by Koichi The performance was accompanied by the new song "DEATH SPIRAL" produced by Koichi.

The show was being performed at 100% capacity, but on January 7, 2021, during the performance, the government declared a state of emergency. The theater was restricted to 50% capacity and the performance was called to be held until 8 p.m. At the same time, the government notified each prefecture that "tickets for events that have been sold by January 11 will not be restricted and will be treated as non-cancellable," and that the performance time for the evening session was originally set at 6 p.m. Since the performance was originally scheduled for two hours, from 6:00 to 8:00 p.m., the performance continued as planned. The performers wore masks until offstage, and fans refrained from talking in the lobby to take thorough precautions against infection by COVID-19. No one from the approximately 30 performers and 100 staff members became infected, and the show completed 44 performances, the most in the series.

==== Cast ====
- Yuta - Yuta Kishi: protagonist. Boxer. He was abandoned by his parents when he was young and grew up in an institution.
- Jin - Yuta Jinguji: 17-0 champ. Yuta's best friend.
- Bi Shonen
  - Yuto - Yuto Nasu: Yuta's younger brother. He grew up in the same facility as Yuta. He admires Champ. Belongs to an idol group. He has a heart condition.
  - Taisho - Taisho Iwasaki: Champ's number one disciple. He has a strong admiration for Champ and hates Yuta.
- Ryuga Sato, Issei Kanazashi, Naoki Fujii, Tobiki Ukisho
- 7 Men Samurai.
  - Reia - Reia Nakamura: boxer who trains at Jin's boxing gym.
  - Rinne Sugata, Katsuki Mototaka, Hiromitsu Sasaki, Daiki Konno, Rei Yabana.
- Maria - Jun Shibuki: produces boxing films.
- Emma - Ran Ohtori (December 10–26, 2020).
- Sakiho Juri (December 27, 2020 - January 27, 2021)

=== 2021 - 2023 ===
The 2021 production ran from September 6–29, 2021, for a total of 31 performances. The main cast was renewed, with Fuma Kikuchi as the lead and Taki Tanaka as the champ, and Koichi Domoto directing, as he did last year.

One act, two hours. Juri sings "SUPER HERO" with members of 7 Men Samurai and Shonen Ninja singing about the spirit of a champ, "Knock Out (K.O.)" by Shonen Ninja training at the gym, "hourglass" (Kikuchi) in which Fuma escapes under suspicion and reveals his feelings while reflecting on his past. Kikuchi himself wrote the lyrics were added as new songs that delve into the emotions and stories of the characters.

The 2022 production was performed September 8–30, 2022. The production starred Fuma Kikuchi, co-starred Juri Tanaka, and was directed by Koichi Domoto. The production had two acts for the first time in three years, and the ballad "Sad Song" by Kikuchi, Shibuki, and Hou at the beginning of Act 2 was revived to further pursue the emotions of the characters. A new scene was added in which a younger Fuma and Juri appear riding a bicycle together, with Ryusei Fukada and Yutaka Motoki playing them in a flying performance.

The 2023 production ran from September 9–28, 2023, for a total of 26 performances. Shota Watanabe played the lead role, Shintaro Morimoto co-starred, and Koichi Domoto directed. After his death in 2019, Johnny Kitagawa, who was credited as Eternal Producer from 2020 to 2022, was removed from this production's credits. The casting was decided by Koichi, but Watanabe declined at one point due to anxiety about the large role, and Morimoto declined due to lack of stage experience. However, each met with Koichi and accepted his enthusiastic offer, saying, "I can't think of anyone else but Watanabe and Morimoto".

In this production, flying above the audience returned after a four-year absence, with Morimoto flying in the opening song "Opening Next Dream" and Watanabe in the closing song "Next Dream (finale ver.)". Koichi, who was directing the show, had considered eliminating the flying, but the two were so eager to fly that it was incorporated with the meaning of flying to avoid meaningless performances. During rehearsals, Koichi, who had been performing flying in "Shock (musical)" for many years, showed them the model and taught them posture, eye contact, etc. In addition, wall flying, in which the main character runs and flies in time with the images while standing perpendicular to a wall, was also incorporated, and Kazuya Kamenashi, who had performed this in the past and visited the rehearsal performance, gave him advice. This time, new songs were prepared for each character, and Watanabe requested "a calm ballad-like song" "Hikari" was performed in the scene where he is hidden in Madame Emma's old theater, and Morimoto performed "Champion" in the boxing gym with a trainee played by 7 Men Samurai. 7 Men Samurai and Shonen Ninja also sang songs such as "Walking to the end", "Make You Wonder", and "Knock Out (K.O.)", bringing out the colors of each team to enliven the hero and the champ.

==== Casts ====
Role	2021	2022	2023
Protagonist	Fuma Kikuchi	Fuma Kikuchi	Shota Watanabe
Champ	Tanaka Tatsuru	Juri Tanaka	Shintaro Morimoto
Kouki	Emeki Kawasaki	Emeki Kawasaki	Kohki Kawasaki
Reia	Reia Nakamura	Reia Nakamura	Reia Nakamura
Maria	Jun Shibuki	Jun Shibuki	Jun Shibuki
Madame Emma	Ran Ootori	Ran Hou	Ran Hou
Wataru	Wataru Vasayega	Wataru Vasayega	Wataru Vasayega
Takumi	Takumi Kitagawa	Takumi Kitagawa	Takumi Kitagawa
Nao	Oriyama Naohiro	Oriyama Naohiro	
Kuroda	Mitsuki Kuroda	Mitsuki Kuroda	
Gym trainees	Rinne Sugata, Katsuki Motodaka, Hiromitsu Sasaki, Daiki Konno, Rei Yabana. Yuu Motoki, Hideo Yasushima, Sota Uchimura, Ryusei Fukada, Mitsunari Hiyama, Shoma Hiratsuka, Kohei Aoki, Rikuto Toyoda	Kohei Aoki Ryusei Fukuda Mitsunari Hiyama Daiki Konno Yutaka Motoki Katsuki Mototaka Hiromitsu Sasaki Rinne Sugata, Rikuto Toyota Sota Uchimura Rei Yabana	Kohei Aoki Ryusei Fukada Mitsunari Hiyama Daiki Konno Yuu Motoki Katsuki Mototaka, Rinne Sugata, Daiko Sasaki Rikuto Toyoda Sota Uchimura Rei Yabana, Hideo Yasushima

==== Characters ====
- Fuma/Shota: A boxer turned TV personality. He leaves the ring on the day of his confrontation with Juri.
- Juri/Shintaro: The champ, the main character's rival and best friend.
- Kouki: younger brother of Fuma/Shota, who is not related to him by blood. Idol Egg. Has a chronic heart condition.
- Reia: A gym student who admires the champ. She enters the theater with a knife in her hand, but is accidentally stabbed.
- Maria: a producer
- Madame Emma: an entertainment producer who is secretly Fuma/Shota's mother
- Wataru: An idol egg who works hard in lessons under Maria and is a leader.
- Takumi: An idol egg, straight-forward and honest.
- Nao: An idol egg, a young boy with a wild streak.
- Kuroda : An idol egg, and the baddest of the five.

=== 2024 ===
The 2024 production ran from October 9, 2024 to October 29, 2024 as part of the closing lineup of the Imperial Theatre, which will be temporarily closed beginning in February 2025. As in the previous production, Shota Watanabe plays the lead role, Shintaro Morimoto co-stars, and Koichi Domoto directs. Morimoto once turned down the offer because he was not satisfied with his performance in the previous production and thought it would be better if someone else played the role, but Watanabe persuaded him that he wanted to play the role because it was with Shintaro, and he decided to appear in the production.

==== Cast ====
- Shota - Shota Watanabe
- Shintaro - Shintaro Morimoto as Champ. main character's rival.
- Shonen Ninja
  - Kairyu Tamura, Naohiro Oriyama, Kohki Kawasaki, Sota Uchimura, Ryusei Fukada, Mitsuteru Kuroda, Mitsunari Hiyama, Ren Kubo, Masaki Oda, Yuyu Motoki, Takumi Kitagawa, Kohei Aoki, Hideo Yasushima, Wataru Vasayega, Yujin Suzuki, Yojiro Taki, Seiki Kawasaki, Hisho Yamai, Yusei Nagase, Rikuto Toyoda, Michiyo Inaba
- Jun Shibuki
- Ran Ohtori

== Related products ==
=== DVD/Blu-ray ===
- Dream Boys (August 11, 2004, Avex Trax) - 2004 edition. DVD / VHS
- Dream Boys (June 28, 2006, Storm Labels) - 2006 edition. DVD
- Dream Boys (February 27, 2008, Storm Labels) - 2007 edition. DVD
- Dream Boys (September 13, 2017, Avex Trax) - 2016 edition DVD
- Dream Boys (August 10, 2022, Universal Music Japan) - 2021 edition; DVD / Blu-ray
- Dream Boys (April 17, 2024; MENT Recording) - 2023 edition; DVD / Blu-ray

=== Bonus CD ===
Included in the DVD "Dream Boys" (Limited First Press Edition AVBD-92532/B) released on September 13, 2017.

==== Track listing ====
1. Next Dream (Opening Version) [3:04] - Yuta Tamamori, Kento Senga, Toshiya Miyata Lyrics by Jhamai, music by Sebastian Fronda, Michael Clauss, Thomas Thornholm, arrangement by Seikou Nagaoka
2. Survivor [4:31] - Yuta Tamamori Lyrics by KOMU, music and arrangement by STEVEN LEE and Chris Wahle
3. Beautiful Days [4:03] - Toshiya Miyata Words by Toshiya Miyata, music and arrangement by ROCK STONE
4. Bomb [4:07] - Kento Senga Lyrics by KENTO.S, music composed and arranged by Tommy Clint, MiNE, Atsushi Shimada
5. Crazy My Dream [3:26] - Yuta Tamamori lyrics by ma-saya, music by Susumu Kawaguchi and RAAY, arrangement by Susumu Kawaguchi

== See also ==
- Playzone - annual musical theatre starring Shonentai and their juniors that had continued since 1986 to 2015.
- Shock, annual Musical starring Koichi Domoto, performed from 2000 to 2024.
- Boys, a series of musicals set in a juvenile prison, premiered in 1969.
