= Busaiku =

Japanese boy band

- Origin: Japan
- Genres: J-pop
- Years active: 2013–present
- Label: MENT Recording
- Spinoff of: Kis-My-Ft2
- Members: Wataru Yokoo; Toshiya Miyata; Takashi Nikaido; Kento Senga

Busaiku (舞祭組) is a Japanese boy band with four members from Kis-My-Ft2. They debuted on December 13, 2013 with the release of their first single "Tana Kara Botamochi" produced by Masahiro Nakai. They were dressed in plain suits like businessmen and sang many comical songs like comedians.

"Busaiku" means "ugly" or "uncool" in Japanese, and was taken from the name of Kis-My-Ft2 namesake show Kis-My Busaiku, which was unusual for a group name from the idol agency, Johnny & Associates.

Their single ""Michishirube"" was number-one on the weekly Oricon Singles Chart.

== Overview ==
On the October 5, 2013 broadcast of "Kiss My Busaiku! (Fuji Television), Masahiro Nakai who was a member of SMAP, mentioned that the "back four" four members of Kis-My-Ft2, Wataru Yokoo, Toshiya Miyata, Takashi Nikaido, and Kento Senga, were not getting much attention compared to the front members, Hiromitsu Kitayama, Taisuke Fujigaya, and Yuta Tamamori. He also offered to provide the music. Masahiro Nakai was senior of Kis-My-Ft2 at the same agent Johnny & Associates, the leader of the national boy band SMAP, and a successful entertainer who has many regular programs and often hosts them. On the November 11, 2013 broadcast of Kis-My Busaiku! (Fuji Television), the four members of the new unit "Busaiku" announced that their debut single "Tana Kara Botamochi" would be released on December 13. The "Sound Room" (TBS Television (Japan)) broadcast on the same day, hosted by Nakai, was their first TV program appearance as Busaiku. In addition to providing the music, Nakai also choreographed and planned and directed the music video. On November 15 of the same year, they performed "Tana Kara Botamochi" live for the first time at Kis-My-Ft2's Tokyo Dome concert.

== Group of "back four" ==
After their debut, Kis-My-Ft2 aggressively promoted the so-called "front three", Yuta Tamamori, Taisuke Fujigaya, and Hiromitsu Kitayama. The three starred in dramas and danced in flashy costumes in singing shows. On the other hand, Kento Senga, Toshiya Miyata, Wataru Yokoo, and Takashi Nikaido called "back four" wore dark costumes like back dancers behind the three, had few singing assignments, and did little individual work. At the time, frequent collaborators were their seniors group SMAP, and member Masahiro Nakai noticed this situation of these four and decided to produce them himself. The concept of the debut song "Tana Kara Botamochi", for which Nakai wrote the lyrics, was "the cry from the heart of 'back 4'" and "the coolness of doing your best even if you are unattractive," and the music video also featured a self-deprecating contrast between the "cool and popular three" and the "uncool and unpopular us."

== Members ==
- Wataru Yokoo
- Toshiya Miyata
- Takashi Nikaido
- Kento Senga

== History ==
=== 2013 ===
On December 13, Busaiku started with their first single "Tana Kara Botamochi".

=== 2014 ===
On April 21, they made a regular appearance on the music program Utage!.

On July 27, they released their second single "Ti Ti Ti Terette Teretititi (Dare no Ketsu)".

On October 18, the television series Heisei Busaiku Otoko, in which all members appear, begins airing.

=== 2015 ===
On March 8, their third single, "Yacchatta!!" was released.

=== 2017 ===
On January 4, their 4th single "Michishirube" was released. The title track is their first self-produced song and a ballad. It reached No. 1 on the Oricon charts for the first time.

Over four days from January 5 to 8, they held a high-touch meeting and public recording titled "Busaiku Oshogatsu Campaign: Japan Nationwide Michishirube no Tabi" (Busaiku New Year Campaign – Japan Nationwide Michishirube's Journey).

On December 13, their first album Busaiku no, Wa! was released.

=== 2018 ===
From January 10 – February 28, their first solo concert tour Busaikumura no Watto! Odoroku! Dai 1 Show was held.

On April 23, their second drama, The end of the XXX people, starring all the members, begins airing.

On August 22, their first live DVD/Blu-ray Busaikumura no Watto! Odoroku! Dai 1 Show was released.

=== 2020 ===
On February 9, the stage play XX People's Lives: The XXX Choices We Made was performed, in which all the members appeared.

On December 10, the DVD XX People's Lives: Bokutachi ha Chosen XX na Choice was released as a mail order only/completely made-to-order product.

== Discography ==
=== Studio albums ===
Title	Album details	Peaks		Certifications
Title	Album details	JPN Oricon	JPN Hot.	Certifications
Busaiku no, Wa!	Released: December 13, 2017; Label: Avex Trax; Format: CD, CD+DVD	1	1	RIAJ: Gold

=== Singles ===
Title	Year	Peak chart positions		Certifications	Album
Title	Year	JPN Oricon	JPN Hot.	Certifications	Album
"Tana Kara Botamochi"	2013	2	2	RIAJ: Gold	Kis-My-Journey; Busaiku no, Wa!
"Ti Ti Ti Terette Teretititi (Dare no Ketsu)"	2014	2	4	RIAJ: Gold	Busaiku no, Wa!
"Yacchatta!!"	2015	3	6	RIAJ: Gold	Busaiku no, Wa!
"Michishirube"	2017	1	2	RIAJ: Gold	Busaiku no, Wa!

== Filmography ==
=== Television drama ===
- Heisei Busaiku Salaryman (NTV, 2014–2015)

=== Music programs ===
- Utage! (TBS, 2014–2015)
- Momm!! (TBS, 2015–2017)

=== Commercials ===
- Asahi Soft Drinks "Spiral Grape" (2014)
- Kowa Company "Cabbage series" (2014–present)

== Concerts ==
Busaikumura no Watto! Odoroku! Dai 1 Show was Busaiku's first concert tour. The theme was "Wa!". (Note: Wa (和, wa), ring (輪, wa), story (話, wa), and laughter (笑, wa).) They performed eighteen songs and mobilized 52,465 people. At the Nakano Sunplaza concert on January 31, Masahiro Nakai made a surprise appearance during the song "Fire & Lightning" and danced with the members. This performance is included in the DVD/Blu-ray standard edition of their Live.

List of concerts, showing date, city, country, venue, and attendance
Date	City	Country	Venue	Attendance	Notes
Asia
January 10, 2018	Osaka	Japan	Grand Cube Osaka	52,465	
January 11, 2018	Osaka	Japan	Grand Cube Osaka	52,465	3 performances
January 25, 2018	Nagoya	Japan	Nagoya Congress Center	52,465	
January 26, 2018	Nagoya	Japan	Nagoya Congress Center	52,465	3 performances
January 30, 2018	Tokyo	Japan	Nakano Sun Plaza	52,465	
January 31, 2018	Tokyo	Japan	Nakano Sun Plaza	52,465	3 performances
February 12, 2018	Tokyo	Japan	NHK Hall	52,465	
February 21, 2018	Sendai	Japan	Sendai Sun Plaza	52,465	
February 22, 2018	Sendai	Japan	Sendai Sun Plaza	52,465	3 performances
February 27, 2018	Fukuoka	Japan	Fukuoka Sunpalace	52,465	
February 28, 2018	Fukuoka	Japan	Fukuoka Sunpalace	52,465	3 performances
