= Kis-My-Journey =

Studio album by Kis-My-Ft2
- Released: July 2, 2014
- Genre: J-pop
- Length: 54:05 (first edition); 57:48 (regular edition)
- Label: Avex Trax

Kis-My-Ft2 chronology
Hit! Hit! Hit! (2014)	Kis-My-Journey (2014)	Kis-My-World (2015)

Singles from Kis-My-Journey
- 1. "Tana Kara Botamochi" Released: December 13, 2013; 2. "Hikari no Signal" Released: March 5, 2014

Music video
- "Seven Journey" on YouTube "3.6.5." on YouTube

Kis-My-Journey is the third studio album by Japanese boy band Kis-My-Ft2. It was released on July 7, 2014, under the record label Avex Trax.

Three days after release, Kis-My-Ft2 started on their first 4-dome tour titled 2014 Concert Tour Kis-My-Journey.

== Overview ==
The main song on the album, "Seven Journey," was written by the duo Kimaguren. The lyrics were written by Kurei and composed by Iseki, and the arrangement was done by Gira Mundo and the Kimaguren team, who worked together to produce the title song. The music video for the title song was created around the theme of a new journey and the feeling of adventure. "3.6.5." is the theme song for a TV commercial featuring Kis-My-Ft2, DHC Corporation's acne prevention cosmetics. The music video for "3.6.5." is a comical expression of men in the world chasing after the members of Kis-My-Ft2 in order to get beautiful skin that attracts women.

== Commercial performance ==
In the Oricon weekly album rankings for the week of July 7, 2014, it debuted at number 1. Sales during its first week totaled over 246,000 copies. It was the fourth consecutive album since their debut to reach number 1, a feat that had not been accomplished for the three years and one month since Superfly's fourth album.

== Package specifications ==
It was released in four different editions:

- First edition A (AVCD-93000/B) CD & DVD
- First edition B (AVCD-93001/B) CD & DVD
- Regular edition (AVCD-93002) CD & Bonus item
- Kis-My Shop edition (AVC1-93003)

The first edition A packaging came in a pink pouch with original sticker set A, while the first edition B packaging came in a blue pouch with original sticker set B. The first editions A and B and first press run of regular edition packages (AVCD-93002X) each came with a prize entry serial code. Each package comes with one of two deluxe 20-page photo booklet, with first editions A and B both including one and regular and Kis-My Shop editions having another.

== Track listing ==
=== CD ===
1. "3rd" Overture [1:25]
  - Composition/Arrangement: Singo Kubota, Satoru Kurihara
2. Seven Journey [4:35]
  - Lyrics: Kurei
  - Composer: Iseki
  - Arranger: Gira Mundo
3. 3.6.5 [4:31]
  - Lyrics: Kenn Kato
  - Composer: Yoshiyasu Ichigawa, Tatsuro Mashiko, ha-j
  - Arranger: Taku Yoshioka
  - DHC "Clinical Acne Control Series" TV commercial song
4. Striker [3:41]
  - Lyrics: Jun, Composer, Arranger: Tommy Clint
5. Daisuki desu [5:10]
  - Lyrics: Satoru Kurihara, Composer, Arranger: Satoru Kurihara, Singo Kubota
  - Ezaki Glico "Watering KissMint Gum" TV commercial song
6. Form song by Hiromitsu Kitayama [4:13]
  - Lyrics・Composition：HusiQ.K, Arrangement: Kasumi, Sou
7. LU4E: Last Song song by Taisuke Fujigaya [5:07]
  - Lyrics：Taisuke Fujigaya、Composition：mr.cho・Lawrence Lee・Kim Tesung、Arrangement：Masaya Suzuki
8. Only One... song by Yuta Tamamori [4:22]
  - Lyrics: Yuta Tamamori, Kelly, Composition：Daichi, Carlos Okabe, Arrangement: Jun Suyama
9. Fire!!! - Hiromitsu Kitayama、Taisuke Fujigaya [3:36]
  - Lyrics: HusiQ.K, T.Fxxx, Composition: CHOKKAKU, Syb, IGGY, Arranger: Chokkaku
10. Tana Kara Botamochi - Busaiku [3:24]
  - Lyrics/Composer/Arranger: Masahiro Nakai, Kouji Miyashita, Masaya Miyashita
11. Tsubasa [4:03]
  - Lyrics/Composition: Yoshiyasu Ichigawa, Tatsuro Mashiko, ha-j, Arrangement: Yoshiyasu Ichigawa
12. Hikari no Signal [4:26]
  - Lyrics：Sensei, Composition: Atsuko Nakatani, Arrangement: Masaya Suzuki
  - Theme song for the film Doraemon: New Nobita's Great Demon—Peko and the Exploration Party of Five
13. Bokura no Yakusoku [5:26]
  - Lyrics: Hajime Watanabe, Composition: XYZ, Arranger: Masafumi Nakao
14. Ageteku ze! [3:41]
  - Lyrics/Composer/Arrangeer: Kazuaki Yamashita
  - Regular edition bonus track

=== DVD ===
First Edition A

1. 「Seven Journey」Music Video
2. 「Seven Journey」Making Of
  - Including member commentary
3. Recording Studio Footage
  - Including member commentary

First Edition B

1. 「3.6.5」Music Video
2. 「3.6.5」Making Of
  - Including member commentary
3. 「Kis-My-TV」
  - A program talking about the album's theme of journeys
  - Including member commentary

=== Bonus items ===
- Original file folder
