= Busaiku no, Wa! =

Studio album by Busaiku
- Released: December 13, 2017
- Genre: J-pop
- Length: 52:01
- Label: Avex Trax

Singles from Busaiku no, Wa!
- 1. "Tana Kara Botamochi" Released: December 13, 2013; 2. "Ti Ti Ti Terette Teretititi (Dare no Ketsu)" Released: July 27, 2014; 3. "Yacchatta!!" Released: March 8, 2015; 4. "Michishirube" Released: January 4, 2017

Music video
- Medley of Busaiku no, Wa! on YouTube

Busaiku no, Wa! is the first album by Japanese boy band Busaiku, released by Avex Trax on December 13, 2017.

== Background ==
The release of the album was announced by a flyer distributed to the audience by "Surume-san" (played by Masahiro Nakai) during Kis-My-Ft2's concert "2015 Concert Tour 'Kis-My-World'" at Tokyo Dome on September 20, 2015. Although the album announcement disappeared from the official website of Johnny & Associates in 2016 with no further news (Note: Between 2015 and 2016, Michi Iijima, a female manager in charge of SMAP and Kis-My-Ft2 left the company, causing the SMAP breakup scandal at the Johnny & Associates. The postponement of the album release is believed to have been influenced by this.)

The album was finally released in November 2017, over two years after the announcement. With this album, Busaiku conducted its first concert tour Busaikumura no Watto! Odoroku! Dai 1 Show in January and February 2018, which was a long-awaited first concert tour. The release date, December 13, was the anniversary of Busaiku's CD debut.

After Nakai proposed the album title "Wa", the members gave it meanings such as "wa", "ring", "talk", and "laugh and surprise" as the album's theme.

== Release ==
The CD was released in three formats: first edition A/B and regular edition. The jacket photo of the CD was taken in the "Busaiku macho" style, with the upper half of his body naked instead of his trademark gray businessman's suit.

The DVD included in the first edition B contains documentary footage of training scenes titled "100 Days Documentary on the Road to Macho by Busaiku". It includes a documentary on their muscle training for the jacket shoot, Also included is footage of all members climbing Mount Fuji as part of their training. The DVD included in the First Edition A includes 10 music videos of the 12 new songs on the album, excluding the two bonus tracks, and shows the "Ten Changes of Busaiku".

== Track listing ==
=== CD ===
"*"is a bonus track. See that page for details of single songs.

1. "Shunka Shuuto Otoko uta" [4:42]
2. "Tana Kara Botamochi" [3:23]
3. "Bussa-sa-sa" [2:17]
4. "Ti Ti Ti Terette Teretititi (Dare no Ketsu)" [3:40]
5. "Tomodachi Shinsei" [2:37]
6. "Like a Mt. Fuji – Victory Dragon" [2:18]
7. "Toro ni Naritai" [2:00]
8. "Me and Hero" [4:35]
9. "Love Shinkei" [3:41]
10. "Chintonshan" [1:55]
11. "Yacchatta!!" [3:41]
12. "Busaiku Soul" [2:58]
13. "Body & Soul – Whole Body and Soul" [2:24]
14. "Michishirube" [4:49]
15. "Saikou Love!" * [3:22]
16. "Fire & Lightning" * [3:39]

=== DVD ===
- First Edition A
1. "Tana Kara Botamochi" (Music Video)
2. "Ti Ti Ti Terette Teretititi (Dare no Ketsu)" (MV)
3. "Yacchatta!!" (Music Video)
4. "Michishirube" (Music Video)
5. "Music Video Medley"
6. "Shunka Aki Fuyu, Hanuta"
7. "Bussassa!"
8. "Friend Request"
9. "Like a Mt.Fuji -The Dragon of Victory"
10. "Toro ni Naritai"
11. "Me and Hero"
12. "Love Sutra"
13. "Chontonshan"
14. "Busaiku Soul"
15. "Body & Soul (Zenshin Zenrei)"
16. Maisakigumi no, wa! Music Video Making Documentary
- Limited First Edition B
1. Busaiku's 100 Days Documentary (Muscle training and Mt. Fuji climbing special)
