= Tana Kara Botamochi =

Single by Busaiku

from the album Kis-My-Journey and Busaiku no, Wa!
- Released: December 13, 2013
- Length: 3:41
- Label: Avex Trax
- Composers: Nakai-san, Miyashita Bros.
- Lyricists: Nakai-san, Miyashita Bros.
- Producer: Masahiro Nakai

Busaiku singles chronology
"Tana Kara Botamochi" (2013)	"Ti Ti Ti Terette Teretititi (Dare no Ketsu)" (2014)

Music video
- "Tana Kara Botamochi" on YouTube

"Tana Kara Botamochi" (棚からぼたもち; lit. 'A Gift from Heaven') is a song and debut single by Busaiku, released on December 13, 2013, by Avex Trax. It was produced by Masahiro Nakai who was a member of Japanese national boy band SMAP.

== Overview ==
This is the first time that Nakai has provided music for other artists other than SMAP and his own solo songs. Note that the name is "Nakai-san" instead of "N. Mappy" which he usually uses. In the lyrics, the three members' names (Kita=Kitayama, Gaya=Fujigaya, and Tama=Tamamori) are abbreviated to each other.

The music video was also planned and directed by Nakai, and was created under the themes of "the cry from the hearts of the four people behind (Kis-My-Ft2)" and "the coolness of doing things desperately, even if they are hapless. The four members appear in the setting of businessmen in plain suits. The music video also features Masahiro Nakai, Hiromitsu Kitayama, Taisuke Fujigaya, and Yuta Tamamori. The letters used in the lyric cards and in the credits of the lyrics in music programs are written by the members themselves. This is the way the lyrics are displayed on the lyric cards and in music programs. by Busaiku.

The release date was Friday, instead of the Wednesday when new albums are traditionally released (the release date was Friday the 13th).

== Chart performance ==
On the Oricon Daily Chart dated December 12, 2013, the album was No. 1 with sales of approximately 71,000 copies. On the Oricon Weekly Chart dated December 23, 2013, it reached No. 2 with 133,000 copies sold.

== Package specifications ==
It was released in 7 forms:

- Limited First Edition A (AVCD-48919/B)
- Limited First Edition B (AVCD-48920/B)
- Regular Edition (AVCD-48921)
- Kiss My SHOP Edition (4 types in total)(AVC1-48922/5)

The first edition A includes the music video of the title track "Tana Kara Botamochi" and a DVD of the making of the music video. The first version of the regular edition is a picture label and comes with a mini photo book (one of two types enclosed). The Kiss My SHOP disc will be available in four formats, each with a different jacket design, picture label, and B2 size solo poster of each member.

== Track listings ==
=== CD ===
1. "Tana Kara Botamochi" :Words, Music, Arrangement: Nakai-san, Miyashita Brothers
2. "Tana Kara Botamochi" (karaoke)

=== DVD ===
- Limited First Edition A only
1. "Tana Kara Botamochi" (Music video)
2. "Tana Kara Botamochi" (Making Movie)
