= Taisuke Fujigaya =

Japanese actor and singer (born 1987)

- 藤ヶ谷太輔
- Born: June 25, 1987 (age 39); Kanagawa Prefecture, Japan
- Other names: Taipy, Gaya-san, Gaya
- Education: Meikai University
- Occupations: Actor, singer, Idol
- Years active: 1999–present
- Agent: Starto Entertainment (Johnny & Associates 2002–2023, Starto Entertainment 2024–present)
- Musical career
- Genres: J-pop
- Instruments: Vocals, guitar
- Label: Ment Recording
- Member of: Kis-My-Ft2
- Website: Taisuke Fujigaya on Instagram; Kis-My-Ft2(Starto Entertainment); Kis-My-Ft2 (Ment Recording)

Taisuke Fujigaya (藤ヶ谷太輔, Fujigaya Taisuke; born June 25, 1987) is a Japanese singer, actor, and radio personality. He is a member of boy band Kis-My-Ft2 under Starto Entertainment. His nicknames are Taipy, Gaya-san, and Gaya.

In addition to working as an actor alongside his boy band activities in Kis-My-Ft2, he has been the main host of the TV talk show "A-Studio" with Shōfukutei Tsurube II since 2020.

On April 23, 2024, the official Instagram was launched.

== History ==
When Fujigaya was 11 years old, his aunt secretly sent his resume to Johnny & Associates for an audition. He was initially unsuccessful, but as he was leaving, he did not know where to return his number tag and asked an elderly man nearby, who turned out to be the company's president, Johnny Kitagawa. On Kitagawa's decision, Fujigaya passed the audition and joined Johnny & Associates in 1998. Several other future idols also took part in the same audition, including Kazuya Kamenashi and Yuichi Nakamaru of KAT-TUN, Takahisa Masuda of NEWS, Ryoichi Tsukada of A.B.C-Z, and Yuki Koshioka of 4U.

In April 2004, the trainee unit Kis-My-Ft. was formed, Fujigaya and Hiromitsu Kitayama and Wataru Yokoo were selected as members. In July 2005, Kento Senga, Toshiya Miyata, Yuta Tamamori, and Takashi Nikaido joined, and the group began activities as Kis-My-Ft2. They made their CD debut on August 10, 2011, with the single Everybody Go.

Fujigaya graduated from Meikai University in 2010 with a degree in economics from the Faculty of Economics.

Fujigaya, known for his strong vocal abilities, often sings key parts in the group's songs. He is also recognized as the member who embodies a mature, cool, and sexy image within Kis-My-Ft2.

Alongside his music career, Fujigaya began acting in 1999, making his television debut in Scary Sunday, My Friend J-kun. In 2012, he played his first starring role in a television series, Beginners!.

In 2014, he starred in his first feature film, Kamen Teacher The Movie, and later that year, he took his first leading role on stage in Colt Gabaments – Hajime no Hajimari.

He went on to perform in works such as He is Beautiful, Mars: Just, I Love You, and Karei-naru Ichizoku, and earned praise for his portrayal in the musical Don Juan in 2019, which was revived in 2021. The stage play And I'm at a Loss, in which he starred in 2019, was later adapted into a film in which he reprised his role. In 2024, he starred in the film Arrogance and Virtue, adapted from the novel by Mizuki Tsujimura, which he had long named as one of his favorite books.

Fujigaya is also known for his interest in fashion. He won the Best Jeanist Award in 2014, 2015, and 2016, an annual fashion award in Japan recognizing celebrities who are considered to look best in jeans, and was subsequently inducted into the award's Hall of Fame. He has often spoken of his fondness for denim, which he attributes to the influence of his father, and he once received a rare pair of Levi's S501XX war model jeans from Tsuyoshi Kusanagi, his co-star in a 2013 drama and a former member of SMAP.

In 2024, Fujigaya launched his own perfume brand, Aimetoi. The name, meaning "love yourself" in French, reflects his personal philosophy. The first products, "8" and "23," were inspired by the time of his birth, 8:23. It was released on November 13, 2024. Fujigaya spent more than six months collaborating with a professional perfumer to develop the scents. He has said his interest in perfume dates back to junior high school, when he admired a senior who wore fragrance, and perfume has since become an essential part of his work, including concerts with Kis-My-Ft2.

== Discography ==
Fujigaya's pen name when writing lyrics is "T.Fxxx".

Title	Lyrics	Composition	Name	Recording	Note
Solo songs
"Love meee"	T.Fxxx; Komei Kobayashi	Allan Eshuijs; Gertjan 'Brainpower' Mulder; Marco Rakascan	Kis-My-Ft2	Album Kis-My-1st	
"xLunaSx"	T.Fxxx	Steven Lee; The Goldfingerz; Drew Ryan Scott	Kis-My-Ft2	Album Good Ikuze!	
"Think u x"	T.Fxxx; Yuki Shirai	Ryosuke Shigenaga	Taisuke Fujigaya; Kis-My-Ft2	Album Good Ikuze! (First limited version Kis-My-Zero) / Bonus CD Good Ikuze! (Kis-My-Zero 3)	
"LU4E (Last Song)"	Taisuke Fujigaya	mr.cho Lawrence Lee; Kim Tesung	Taisuke Fujigaya; Kis-My-Ft2	Album Kis-My-Journey	
"You're Liar"	T.Fxxx	Johann Sebastian Bach	Taisuke Fujigaya; Kis-My-Ft2	Album I Scream(4cups version Bonus CD)	Live Video on YouTube
"Life is Beautiful (For you, my precious.)"	Taisuke Fujigaya	Shibu; YU-G	Taisuke Fujigaya; Kis-My-Ft2	Album Music Colosseum (Normal version)	
"Toxxxic"	Kanata Okajima; Soma Genda	Kanata Okajima; Soma Genda	Taisuke Fujigaya; Kis-My-Ft2	Album Yummy!! (Normal version)	
"Love=X2U"	Yuki Fujiwara	Shinichi Ohsawa	Kis-My-Ft2	Album Free Hugs! (Normal version) Bonus CD	
"Maria"	Takashi Iioka	Takashi Iioka	Kis-My-Ft2	Album Best of Kis-My-Ft2 (First edition B Bonus CD)	
"Yobukoe"	Taisuke Fujigaya; Katsuhiko Takeuchi	Katsuhiko Takeuchi	Taisuke Fujigaya	Live DVD/Blu-ray Live Tour 2021 Home (Normal version bonus CD "Kis-My-Ft2 10th Anniversary Extra CD"); Single Fear/So Blue (First edition A) – Music video	Music Video on YouTube
"Breaking The Dawn"	Akira	Jenna Donnelly; Kiyohito Komatsu; Vlad Alexandru; Opruta Adrian	Taisuke Fujigaya; Johnny's All Stars Island	Live DVD/Blu-ray Live Tour 2021 HOME (Normal edition) Bonus CD "Kis-My-Ft2 10th Anniversary Extra CD"	
"Sexy Peach"	Shingo Asari	Shingo Asari	Taisuke Fujigaya; Kis-My-Ft2	Album Music Colosseum First edition B bonus DVD	
Small group songs and other songs
"No.1 Friend"	821R	Koji Makaino	Kis-My-Ft2	DVD/Blu-ray Kis-My-Ft2 Kis-My-MiNT Tour at Tokyo Dome 2012.4.8 (First edition bonus CD Kis-My-Zero2 – Hiromitsu Kitayama and Taisuke Fujigaya	
"Thanks for everything"	T.Fxxx	HusiQ.K (Hiromitsu Kitayama)	Kis-My-Ft2		
"Kickin'it"	Komu	Niclas Molinder; Joacim Persson; Johan Alkenas; Drew Ryan Scott	Kis-My-Ft2	Album Kis-My-1st – Hiromitsu Kitayama, Taisuke Fujigaya and Yuta Tamamori	
"Rocking Party"	HusiQ.K; T.Fxxx	Stephan Elfgren	Kis-My-Ft2	Album Good Ikuze! First edition bonusCD Kis-My-Zero3 – Hiromitsu Kitayama, Taisuke Fujigaya and Yuta Tamamori	
"Fire!!!"	HusiQ.K; T.Fxxx	Chokkaku; Syb; Iggy	Kis-My-Ft2; Hiromitsu Kitayama; Taisuke Fujigaya	Album Kis-My-Journey – Hiromitsu Kitayama and Taisuke Fujigaya; Album I Scream (4cups version PV)	
"Akashi"	Hyoue Ebata (Triplane)	Hyoue Ebata (Triplane)	Hiromitsu Kitayama; Taisuke Fujigaya; Kis-My-Ft2	Album Kis-My-World	
"Wonderful"	Kelly	Sosaku Ohtake	Wataru Yokoo; Taisuke Fujigaya; Kis-My-Ft2	Album Kis-My-World – Wataru Yokoo and Taisuke Fujigaya	
"Without Your Love"	Emi K. Lynn	Takarot; Lidbom Erik Gustaf	Taisuke Fujigaya and Yuta Tamamori; Johnny's All Stars IsLand (2016–2017)		
"& say"	T.Fxxx; Satoru Kurihara; JUN; Shingo Kubota	HusiQ.K; Satoru Kurihara; Shingo Kubota	Kis-My-Ft2; Hiromitsu Kitayama; Taisuke Fujigaya	Album I Scream – Hiromitsu Kitayama and Taisuke Fujigaya	
"Touch"	Komei Kobayashi	Andreas Ohrn; Christoffer Lauridsen	Kis-My-Ft2; Taisuke Fujigaya and Yuta Tamamori	Single Sha la la Summer Time (Normal edition) – Taisuke Fujigaya and Yuta Tamamori	
"Zero"	Riako Tsukioka	Kento Takeda; Christofer Erixon; Shikata	Hiromitsu Kitayama, Taisuke Fujigaya and Yuta Tamamori; Kis-My-Ft2	Single You & Me – Hiromitsu Kitayama, Taisuke Fujigaya and Yuta Tamamori; DVD/Blu-ray Live Tour 2018 Yummy!! You & Me First edition Bonus CD – Kis-My-Ft2	
"Real Me"	Keiichi Osawa	Park Woo Sung	Hiromitsu Kitayama and Taisuke Fujigaya; Kis-My-Ft2	Album Yummy!! – Hiromitsu Kitayama and Taisuke Fujigaya	
"ConneXion"	Taisuke Fujigaya	Kanata Okajima; Soma Genda	Taisuke Fujigaya, Kento Senga and Wataru Yokoo; Kis-My-Ft2	Single Love (Normal edition) – Taisuke Fujigaya, Kento Senga and Wataru Yokoo	This song was dramatized within "Kiss My Doki Doki".
"Bacteria"	Shirose from White Jam	Shirose from White Jam; Dazsta	Hiromitsu Kitayama and Taisuke Fujigaya; Kis-My-Ft2	Album To-y2 (Normal edition) bonusCD – Hiromitsu Kitayama and Taisuke Fujigaya	
"Nextaction feat. Taisuke Fujigaya"	Kenn Kato; Kenji Kabashima	Kazuhiro Hara	Tomohisa Yamashita	Tomohisa Yamashita Album A Nude	Joined by rap
"Yummy, lovely night"	TSINGTAO; Samuel Kim; Sorato	TSINGTAO; Samuel Kim; Sorato	Taisuke Fujigaya, Kento Senga and Wataru Yokoo by Kis-My-Ft2	"Curtain Call" (regular edition)	

== Filmography ==
=== Films ===
Year	Title	Role	Notes	Ref.
2014	Kamen Teacher: The Movie	Gota Araki	Leading role	
2016	Nobunaga Concerto	Maeda Toshiie		
2016	Mars	Rei Kashino		
2023	And So I'm at a Loss	Yūsuke Sugawara	Leading role	
2024	Arrogance and Virtue	Kakeru Nishizawa	Leading role	

=== Television series ===
Year	Title	Role	Notes	Ref.
1999	Kowai Nichiyōbi, Ep. Tomodachi no J-kun (怖い日曜日 友達のJ君)	J-kun		
2006	Shimokita Sundays (下北サンデーズ)	Shin Satō		
2007	Byakkotai (白虎隊)	Matahachi Itō		
2011	Misaki Number One!! (美咲ナンバーワン!!)	Kazuma Kujō		
2011	Bishoku Cameraman – Hoshii Yu no Jiken-bo 2 (美食カメラマン 星井裕の事件簿2): Monday Golden (月曜ゴールデン) short drama	Hikaru Hōjō		
2011	He is Beautiful	Shu Fujishiro	Leading role	
2012	Perfect Son	Kengo Mifune		
2012	Beginners! (ビギナーズ!)	Tetpei Shimura	Leading role	
2012	Priceless	Kotaro Enomoto		
2013	Kamen Teacher	Gota Araki	Leading role	
2013	Honto ni Atta Kowai Hanashi: Summer Special 2013 "X Hospital" (ほんとにあった怖い話 夏の特別編2013「Xホスピタル」)	Naoki Sakaki	Leading role	
2013	A Swinging Single (独身貴族, Dokushin Kizoku)	Yuta Kawagoe		
2014	Kin'yō Road Show Kamen Teacher Kagai Jugyō SP (金曜ロードショー 仮面ティーチャー課外授業SP)	Gota Araki		
2014	Nobunaga Concerto	Maeda Inuchiyo		
2016	Mars: Tada, Kimi wo Aishiteru (Mars~ただ, 君を愛してる~)	Rei Kashino	Leading role	
2016	I Want to Fall in Love and Play Basketball	Asamitsu Tsuchiya	Leading role	
2017	Beautiful Bones: Sakurako's Investigation	Shotaro Tatewaki		
2019	Mirror Twins	Yugo Katsuragi/Keigo Katsuragi (two roles)	Leading role/ 2 seasons	
2020	Whatever I'm in Sickness and in Health	Ichiharu Sudo	Leading role	
2021	The Grand Family	Ginpei Manpyō		
2023	Hamaru Otoko ni Keritai Onna (ハマる男に蹴りたい女）	Koichi Shitara	Leading role	
2024	Undercover Brother and Sister Special Fraud Investigator	Houou	ep.6-	

=== Streaming dramas ===
Title	Broadcast dates	Broadcasting company	Role	Notes	Ref.
ConneXion	July 2, 2021 – August 6, 2021	dTV (Lemino)	Starring with Wataru Yokoo and Kento Senga	total of 6 episodes	
Happy Kanako's Killer Life	From 28 February to 28 March 2025	DMM TV	Sakurai	total of 6 episodes	

==== Smartphone dramas ====
- Shinikare (シニカレ) (May 8–28, 2012, NOTTV) — Masaki Kisaragi

== Theatre plays and musicals ==
Year	Title	Role	Theatre	Notes	Ref.
2009	Takizawa Enbujo '09 Tacky & Lucky Love		Shinbashi Enbujo		
2009	Playzone 2009: A Letter From The Sun		Aoyama Theatre, Umeda Arts Theater	Leading role (triple lead with Kitayama and Tamamori)	
2014	Cortuga Baments – Hajime no Hajimari	Hajime Fujii	Parco Theatre, Morinomiya Piloti Hall, Kitakyushu Performing Arts Center	Leading role	
2015	Take Five	Mamoru Homura	Akasaka ACT Theater, Umeda Arts Theater	Leading role	
2016	Take Five 2	Mamoru Homura / Aki Mamiya (2 roles)	Akasaka ACT Theater	Leading role	
2016	Johnnys' All Stars Island		Imperial Theatre		
2018	And I'm at a Loss	Yuichi Sugawara	Bunkamura Theatre Cocoon, Morinomiya Piloti Hall	Leading role	
2019, 2021	Don Juan	Don Juan	Akasaka ACT Theater, Kariya City Cultural Center Iris Large Hall (2019); Akasaka ACT Theater, Umeda Arts Theater (2021)	Leading role	
2022	Vildanden	Greigels Verlé	Setagaya Public Theatre, Hankyu Naka Hall, Hyogo Performing Arts Center	Leading role	

== Other activities ==
For activities as a member of Kis-My-Ft2, see Kis-My-Ft2#Group activities.

=== TV ===
- A-Studio+(A-Studio) – Main host with Shōfukutei Tsurube II (April 2020 -, TBS Television (Japan))

=== Radio ===
- Peaceful days of Taisuke Fujigaya (藤ヶ谷太輔 Peaceful Days) – (April 6, 2019 – March 29, 2025, Nippon Broadcasting System, Inc.)

=== Streaming Program ===
- Kis-My-Ft2's Taisuke Fujigaya & Wataru Yokoo – NAKED: A Candid Two-Person Trip to Okinawa (May 30, 2025– Hulu)
  - A digest version was broadcast on Nippon TV on June 27, 2025. The narration was provided by Tatsuya Shimekake of Travis Japan, who is known to be close to Fujigaya.

=== Commercial ===
- NOTTV "Sinikare" – (May 2012)
- M.C. Networks Japan "Ginza Color" – (February 2015)
- Nature Labo "Acnes Labo" – (October 2017)
- Mercedes-Benz Japan
  - SL63 sports car (April 24, 2024)
  - Mercedes-AMG Experience on Track (July 4, 2025)
- Tsuruhara pharmaceutical Co., Ltd.- (March 2025) He appeared in a corporate promotional commercial.

=== Event ===
- Bottega Veneta – Bottega Veneta and Photographer Alec Soth's Photo Exhibition Tokyo Playtime (March 28, 2024)- Attended the opening reception with Yuta Tamamori
