= Wataru Yokoo =

Japanese singer and actor (born 1986)

- 横尾渉
- Born: May 16, 1986 (age 40); Kanagawa, Japan
- Occupations: Singer, actor, haiku poet, idol
- Years active: 2001–present
- Agent: Starto Entertainment (Johnny & Associates 2001–2023, Starto Entertainment 2024–present)
- Spouse: (m. 2023)
- Musical career
- Genres: J-pop
- Instrument: Vocals
- Label: MENT Recording
- Member of: Kis-My-Ft2, Busaiku
- Website: What The Tel! '86 on Instagram; Kis-My-Ft2(Starto Entertainment); Kis-My-Ft2(MENT Recording)

Wataru Yokoo (Japanese: 横尾渉, Hepburn: Wataru Yokoo; born May 16, 1986) is a Japanese singer, actor and haiku poet who is a member of boy band Kis-My-Ft2 and its derivative group Busaiku(舞祭組) under Starto Entertainment. His nickname is Watter and Shi-sho (master in Japanese).

== History ==
He joined Johnny & Associates on February 4, 2001. He was taken to the audition site by his brother who told him to go to futsal. At the same audition, Toshiya Miyata and Takashi Nikaido, who later became members of Kis-My-Ft2 also participated.

As a trainee (Johnny's Jr.), he was a member of J-support (later renamed K.K.Kity) until 2003, in April 2004 he was selected as a member of Kis-My-Ft. and started working with Hiromitsu Kitayama and Taisuke Fujigaya, and in July 2005, Yuta Tamamori, Toshiya Miyata, Kento Senga, and Takashi Nikaido joined to form Kis-My-Ft2 and became its members.

In October 2010, he made his first drama appearance in Fuji TV's "Freelancer Buys a House".

Kis-My-Ft2 made their CD debut with "Everybody Go" on August 10, 2011, seven years after their formation.

On December 13, 2013, Busaiku was formed from Kis-My-Ft2 with Kento Senga, Toshiya Miyata and Takashi Nikaido produced by Masahiro Nakai who was a member of SMAP.

He is also known for his talent in composing haiku. He has twice won the in-program Haiku Meijin Tournament on Mainichi Broadcasting System variety show "Prevato," which he has appeared on irregularly since 2015.

On January 26, 2023, he announced on the official website of Johnny & Associates that he married a civilian woman, becoming the first Kis-My-Ft2 member to be married.

== First-class license as Dismanling for Tuna ==
Yokoo is known for his culinary skills and even has a regular column in a cooking magazine, but he also has an unusual license. In 2017, Yokoo obtained a first-class license as dismanling for tuna on Kis-My-Ft2's variety show Kis-Mileage, which aired on TV Asahi. A first-class license as dismanling for tuna is a difficult license to dismantle large tuna to make sushi and sashimi using a long, dangerous knife at shows and other events while enlivening the occasion with conversation. At the time, there were only seven people in Japan who held a first-class license, and none of the celebrities had obtained it. Yokoo failed the test once when he took it in March, but he repeatedly trained on his own between jobs and took the final test at the Tsukiji fish market in Tokyo. He then passed, albeit with a condition ("Although his skills was passable, he has no experience performing shows alone, so he must perform shows with another first-class dismantler for a while").

== Discography ==
Title	Lyrics	Composition	Name	Recorded by	Note
Solo songs
"Watter's bento"	Shingo Asari	Shingo Asari	Wataru Yokoo; Kis-My-Ft2	Album I Scream (4cup edition) – Wataru Yokoo	Live video on YouTube
"Let's play catch"	Billiken; Tohru Nagae	Billiken; Tohru Nagae	Kis-My-Ft2	Album Free Hugs! (Normal edition) – Wataru Yokoo	
"Things that light me up"	Kelly	Erik Lidbom; Carlos K.	Wataru Yokoo; Kis-My-Ft2	Live DVD/Blu-ray Live Tour 2021 Home (Normal Edition BonusCD) Single Fear/So Blue (First Edition A, MV)	Music video on YouTube
"The taste of my cooking"	Shingo Asari	Shingo Asari	Wataru Yokoo; Kis-My-Ft2	Album Music Colosseum (First edition B BonusDVD) – Wataru Yokoo	
Small group songs
"Catch & Go!!"	Ena	Chokkaku; Syb; Iggy	Kis-My-Ft2	Album Kis-My-1st – Wataru Yokoo, Toshiya Miyata, Takashi Nikaido and Kento Senga	
"Forza!"	Hikari	Hikari; Stephan Elfgren	Kis-My-Ft2	Album Good Ikuze! – Yuta Tamamori with Wataru Yokoo, Toshiya Miyata, Takashi Nikaido and Kento Senga	
"Chance Chance Baybee"	Takuya Harada	Takuya Harada; Samuel Wearmo	Kis-My-Ft2	Album Good Ikuze! – Wataru Yokoo, Toshiya Miyata, Takashi Nikaido and Kento Senga	
"Wonderful"	Kelly	Sohsaku Ohtake	Wataru Yokoo; Taisuke Fujigaya; Kis-My-Ft2	Album Kis-My-World – Taisuke Fujigaya and Wataru Yokoo	
"Hostess bar "Show-Wa" "	Shingo Asari	Shingo Asari	Kis-My-Ft2; Hiromitsu Kitayama; Wataru Yokoo; Toshiya Miyata	Album Sha la la Summer Time (First edition A) – Hiromitsu Kitayama, Toshiya Miyata and Wataru Yokoo	One of the songs sung here, "Namida Sake," is by Wataru Yokoo.
"ConneXion"	Taisuke Fujigaya	Kanata Okajima; Soma Genda	Taisuke Fujigaya, Kento Senga and Wataru Yokoo; Kis-My-Ft2	Single Love (Normal Edition) – Taisuke Fujigaya, Kento Senga and Wataru Yokoo	The video was made as a drama project of Kis-My Doki Doki.。
"Butterflies of the Kingdom"	Itsuki Natsui; Wataru Yokoo	baku	Wataru Yokoo and Kento Senga; Kis-My-Ft2	Album To-y2 (Normal Edition) – Wataru Yokoo and Kento Senga	
"Yummy, lovely night"	TSINGTAO; Samuel Kim; Sorato	TSINGTAO; Samuel Kim; Sorato	Taisuke Fujigaya, Kento Senga and Wataru Yokoo by Kis-My-Ft2	"Curtain Call" (regular edition)	

== Appearance information ==
=== Television drama ===
- Freelancer Buys a House. Episodes 4 – 9 (2010, Fuji TV) – Kazuhiko Nishimoto
- Your Honor! I'm hungry! Episode 21 (March 16, 2014, Nippon TV) – Yoichiro Shimizu
- Heisei Busaiku Otoko(平成舞祭組男) (October 18, 2014 – January 4, 2015, Nippon TV) – - as Wataru Yokoo, the group's lead (with Kento Senga, Toshiya Miyata, Takashi Nikaido)
- Shin Naniwa Kinyudo (January 24, 2015, Fuji TV)
- XXX People's Lives(○○な人の末路) (April 24 – June 26, 2018, Nippon TV) – as Kenta Totsuka, the group lead (starring with Kento Senga, Toshiya Miyata, Takashi Nikaido and four others)

=== Web drama ===
- ConneXion (July 2, 2021 – August 6, 2021, Lemino(dTV)) – Leading role (triple starring with Taisuke Fujigaya and Kento Senga)

=== Live performance ===
- The Legend of the Galactic Heroes: The King of the Attacks (August 3–12, 2012, The Galaxy Theatre) – Siegfried Kirchheiss (Actor)
- The Legend of the Galactic Heroes: Shining Star, Breaking Through the Darkness (November 15–18, 2012, Tokyo International Forum) – Playing the role of Siegfried Kirchheiss (with Takashi Nikaido)
- The Legend of the Galactic Heroes Chapter 3: Civil War (March 31 – April 13, 2013, Aoyama Theatre) – as Siegfried Kirchheiss
- The Legend of the Galactic Heroes Chapter 4: The Second Part, Clash (February 12 – March 2, 2014, Aoyama Theatre) – Playing the role of Dusty Attenborough
- Yamamoto Test Paper vol.2 "Pictogram" (May 2–7, 2024 (tentative), Theater Sun-mall)
- Some Day (February 20–26, 2025, Theater Sunmall) – as Tomonosuke Nishiura

== Other activities ==
For activities as a member of Kis-My-Ft2, see Kis-My-Ft2#Group activities.

=== Variety shows ===
- Prevato!!(プレバト!!) – (July 2015 Mainichi Broadcasting System) – Irregular appearances
- Pet no Oukoku Wanda Land (October 5, 2015 – March 26, 2017, Asahi Broadcasting Corporation) – Regular
- Kis-My-Ft2 Yokoo's "First sneak into Ghibli Park! -Secret Spots" (November 1, 2022, Chūkyō Television Broadcasting)

=== Magazine ===
- Cookpad plus serialization "Wataru dish" (Fusosha Publishing, November 2021–)

=== Commercials ===
- NTT Docomo – "FOMA" (2005–2006)
