= Takashi Nikaido =

Japanese actor and singer (born 1990)

- 二階堂高嗣
- Born: August 6, 1990 (age 35); Tokyo, Japan
- Other names: Nika, Nika-chan
- Occupations: Actor, singer, Idol
- Years active: 2001–present
- Agent: Starto Entertainment (Johnny & Associates 2001–2023, Starto Entertainment 2024–present)
- Musical career
- Genres: J-pop
- Instruments: Vocals, bass
- Label: MENT Recording
- Member of: Kis-My-Ft2

YouTube information
- Channel: NIKAchanNEL
- Years active: 2023–present
- Genre: Camping
- Subscribers: 69 thousand
- Views: 4.6 million
- Last updated: January 4, 2026
- Website: Kis-My-Ft2(Starto Entertainment); Kis-My-Ft2(MENT Recording)

Takashi Nikaido (Japanese: 二階堂高嗣, Hepburn: Takashi Nikaidō; born August 6, 1990) is a Japanese actor and singer who is a member of boy band Kis-My-Ft2 and its derivative group Busaiku (舞祭組) under Starto Entertainment. His nickname is Nika and Nika-chan.

== History ==
Nikaido's older sister was a fan of the Kinki Kids and sent Nikaido's resume to the Johnny & Associates when he was 10 years old. He said his sister told him that he was going to a Kinki Kids concert today and took him to the audition site. After auditioning, he joined Johnny & Associates in February 2001. At the same audition venue were Toshiya Miyata and Wataru Yokoo, who later became members of Kis-My-Ft2.

He was only 10 years old when he entered show business, and it is said that he had a rebellious period due to the frustration of not being able to CD debut quickly. At the Johnny's, which had a strict hierarchical relationship, he surprised everyone by calling his seniors without an honorific title. When he met Shingo Katori of SMAP, the most successful group in Johnny's at the time, he scared everyone by saying, "Who are you?." But he is said to have had a strange charm that did not make people hate him for it.

After joining several groups as a trainee (Johnny's Jr.), he was selected as a member of Kis-My-Ft2 in 2005, and he made his CD debut with Everybody Go on August 10, 2011, seven years after their formation.

In 2001, he made his first drama appearance in Fuji TV's "NO KISS".

In 2011, he made his first film appearance in the movie "Ogawa no be"小川の辺.

On December 13, 2013, Busaiku was formed from Kis-My-Ft2 with Kento Senga, Toshiya Miyata and Wataru Yokoo produced by Masahiro Nakai who was a member of SMAP.

He is physically strong and a good acrobat, often performing somersaults and backflips at live shows. He is also a good rapper and often raps in Kis-My-Ft2's songs. In Kis-My-Ft2, he is in charge of live direction.

He loves solo camping and opened his personal official YouTube channel on the theme of camping in December 2023.

On September 15, 2024, he announced that he would take a temporary hiatus due to health problems. He had been absent from the final day performance of Kis-My-Ft2's concert tour Kis-My-Ft2 Dome Tour 2024 Synopsis on September 8 due to health problems.

On January 10, 2025, it was reported that Nikaido would return from hiatus and resume his activities. On January 18, 2025, Nikaido held a return press conference via live streaming on Kis-My-Ft2's YouTube page. In it, he revealed that the cause of his hiatus was that he had problem with his liver and that he had fully recovered.

== First Solo Program ==
Starting in April 2025, Nikaido's first solo variety show, Nika Game (Japanese: ニカゲーム), aired for a total of four episodes. The program was spun off from a segment of Kis-My-Ft2's variety show Can We Do It for 100,000 Yen? (100,000 Yen de Dekirukana).

Although produced as a variety program, its title was deliberately reminiscent of the South Korean drama Squid Game. Because the English word "squid" is translated as "ika" (イカ) in Japanese, the series became known in Japan as "Ika Game", which closely resembles the sound of "Nika Game". For the first broadcast, some costumes, set pieces, and the large Young-hee doll from Squid Game were borrowed.

In its renewed format, Nikaido appeared as one of the three main cast members alongside Timelesz's new member Shuto Inomata and comedian Kemuri Matsui. Although broadcast in a late-night slot, the show gained popularity for its unique concept in which Matsui and guest performers attempted to anticipate the unexpected answers and ideas of Nikaido and Inomata to various English-language questions. Following its positive reception, a one-hour special was produced in June, an event was held in August, and the show was later confirmed to become a regular series starting in October.

== Nakai's Watch ==
Masahiro Nakai is known for taking care of his junior members of Johnny's, and Kis-My-Ft2 members are said to be especially fond of him as his direct juniors. In 2016, four members of Busaiku had dinner with Nakai, who had produced busaiku, Nikaido was given a luxury watch by Nakai. The watch was a Franck Muller wristwatch that Nakai bought it for himself on his 30th birthday, Nikaido jokingly asked, "It's a nice watch. I want it," and Nakai removed the watch on the spot and gave it to Nikaido as a real gift. Since then, Nikaido always wore this watch, appeared on TV and at concerts, and at every occasion mentioned that it was a watch given to him by Nakai. Nakai had told him, "When you turn 30, buy your own watch," so in 2021, the 10th anniversary of Kis-My-Ft2's debut, Nikaido bought a limited edition watch at Franck Muller. Nikaido is said to have great respect for Nakai, and often appears at Kis-My-Ft2 concerts wearing a hat, as Nakai did when he was in SMAP.

== Discography ==
- Jossy Matsumura=Takashi Nikaido

Title	Lylics	Composer	Name	Recorded by	Note
Solo songs
"Jossy Matsumura's Scream"	Jossy Matsumura	Erik Smaaland	Kis-My-Ft2; Takashi Nikaido	Album I Scream (4cups)	Live video on YouTube
"Hagusta"	Diggy-MO'	Christofer Erixon; Josef Melin	Kis-My-Ft2; Takashi Nikaido	Album Free Hugs! (Normal Edition)	
"Brave Tuning"	Super Bears	Super Bears	Takashi Nikaido; Kis-My-Ft2	LiveDVD/Blu-ray Live Tour 2021 Home (Normal Edition BonusCD) Single Fear/So Blue (First Edition A, MV)	Brave Tuning on YouTube
Small group songs
"Catch & Go!!"	ENA	Chokkaku; SYB・Iggy	Kis-My-Ft2	Album Kis-My-1st – Wataru Yokoo, Toshiya Miyata, Takashi Nikaido and Kento Senga	
"Forza!"	Hikari	Hikari; Stephan Elfgren	Kis-My-Ft2	Album Good Ikuze! – Yuta Tamamori with Wataru Yokoo, Toshiya Miyata, Takashi Nikaido and Kento Senga	
"Chance Chance Baybee"	Takuya Harada	Takuya Harada; Samuel Wearmo	Kis-My-Ft2	Album Good Ikuze! – Wataru Yokoo, Toshiya Miyata, Takashi Nikaido and Kento Senga	
"Double Up"	Komei Kobayashi	Kei Kwangwook Lim; Ryan Kim; CR; Chase	Takashi Nikaido; Kento Senga; Kis-My-Ft2	Album Kis-My-World – Takashi Nikaido and Kento Senga	
"2 in 7 billion"	SHIKATA	SHIKATA; KAY	Kis-My-Ft2; Takashi Nikaido; Kento Senga	Single Sha la la Summer Time (First edition B) – Takashi Nikaido and Kento Senga	
"Happy Birthday"	Rena Komatsu	Takuya Harada; Christofer Erixon; Josef melin	Hiromitsu Kitayama and Takashi Nikaido; Kis-My-Ft2	Single Love	
"#No!No!"	Shingo Asari	Shingo Asari	Yuta Tamamori and Takashi Nikaido; Kis-My-Ft2	Album To-y2 (Normal edition) – Yuta Tamamori and Takashi Nikaido	

== Filmography ==
=== TV Drama ===
- Digital photo drama "NO KISS" (September 25, 2001, Fuji TV) – played the role of Yoshihiko in his elementary school days (reminiscent scene)
- BAD BOYS J (April 7, 2013 – June 23, 2013, Nippon TV) – Danno Hidenori role
- Woman Contractor – The Trap of a Trapped Woman (September 12, 2014, Fuji TV) – Shunsaku Kogure as Shunsaku
- Heisei Maisakigumi Otoko (October 18, 2014 – January 4, 2015, Nippon TV) – as Takatsugu Nikaido, the group lead
- Why was my family erased? Psychopath of Fear Who Manipulates the Mind – Narumi Saku's Challenge II (July 1, 2015, Nippon TV) – as Takasugi Sota
- Tokucho no Onna – National Tax Bureau Special Investigation Department (March 4, 2017, Fuji TV) – as Koichiro Zaizen
- "OO" People's Lives (April 24 – June 26, 2018, Nippon TV) – as Toshiki Hagiwara, the group's lead actor (the four members of Maisakigumi, including Kento Senga, Toshiya Miyata, and Wataru Yokoo)
- Midsummer Boy – 19452020 Final Episode (September 18, 2020, TV Asahi)

=== Variety Show ===
- Nika Game (From April 2025, TV Asahi)
- Nika Game: Kis-My-Ft2’s Nikaido, Timeless Inomata, and Reiwa Kemuri Take on a Super Basic English Quiz (June 29, 2025 TV Asahi)

=== Movie ===
- Ogawa no be (2011, Toei) – as Samon Ota
- BAD BOYS J THE MOVIE -The Last Guardian- (November 9, 2013) – Playing the role of Hidenori Danno
- Adult Friendship (May 12, 2023) – Playing the role of an apartment resident

=== Streaming Dramas ===
- Pleasure Installation ( December 4–25, 2020, dTV (Lemino)) – Taka Toyama as Taka

== Live Performances ==
=== Legend of the Galactic Heroes ===
- The Legend of the Galactic Heroes: The Ginga Eiyu Densetsu: Gekkou Ouhen ( August 3–12, 2012, Tennozu Ginga Gekijo Theatre) – Playing the role of Caldwell
- The Legend of the Galactic Heroes: Shining Star, Breaking Through the Darkness ( November 15–18, 2012, Tokyo International Forum) – as Darfit von Reuss (opposite Wataru Yokoo)
- The Legend of the Galactic Heroes Chapter 3: Civil War (March 31 – April 13, 2013, Aoyama Theatre) – as Wolfgang Mittermeier
- The Legend of the Galactic Heroes: Chapter 4, The Second Part, Clash (February 12 – March 2, 2014, Aoyama Theatre) – as Wolfgang Mittermeier

=== Moshi Mo Juku ===
- Moshi Mo Juku ( April 5 and 7, 2019, Tokyo Globe Theatre)
- Moshi Mo Juku Hagi Performance ( May 25 and 26, 2019, Hagi Civic Center, Main Hall)
- Moshi Mo Juku ( March 22 and 23, 2023, Tokyo Globeza)
- Moshi Mo Juku Fukuoka Performance ( April 19–20, 2023, Canal City Theater)

== Other Activities ==
For activities as a member of Kis-My-Ft2, see Kis-My-Ft2#Group activities.

=== Radio ===
- Appare yatteremasu! (October 11, 2021 – , MBS Radio (Japan)) Regular on Mondays

=== Commercial ===
- Sapporo Breweries "Sapporo WATER SOUR" (August 24, 2021)

=== YouTube ===
- NIKAchanNEL – (December 2023– ) Weekly updates
