= Busaikumura no Watto! Odoroku! Dai 1 Show =

Japanese boy band Busaiku Live DVD/Blu-ray

Video by Busaiku
- Released: August 22, 2018
- Recorded: February 12, 2018
- Venues: NHK Hall, Tokyo, Japan
- Label: Avex Trax

Busaikumura no Watto! Odoroku! Dai 1 Show (舞祭組村のわっと! 驚く! 第1笑) is the first live DVD/Blu-ray of Japanese boy band Busaiku and was released by Avex Trax on August 22, 2018.

== Overview ==
This was Busaiku's first live tour with their first album Busaiku no Wa! released on December 13, 2017.

This concert tour included 21 performances at 6 venues in Japan (Osaka, Nagoya, Tokyo (two locations), Sendai, and Fukuoka) from January to February 2018.

The video was made at the Tokyo NHK Hall performance held on February 12, 2018.

It was released in three forms: First edition and Regular edition (DVD/Blu-ray). First edition includes a DVD with documentary footage closely following the Busaiku members on their live tour. The regular edition includes Masahiro Nakai's “Fire & Lightning” performance, which was a special appearance at the Nakano Sunplaza concert at 31 January 2018. In addition, the supplementary audio of the regular edition includes LIVE talk and commentary audio of the Busaiku members, giving the viewer the feeling of watching the concert with the members.

== Track listing ==
Concert DVD/Blu-ray

No.	Title	Length
1.	"Bussassa"
2.	"Tana Kara Botamochi"
3.	"Chin Ton Shan"
4.	"Tomodachi Shinsei"
5.	"Renai Shingyo"
6.	"Toro ni Naritai"
7.	"Thi-thi-thi Terette Terethithithi (Dare no Ketsu)"
8.	"On Stage Banter"
9.	"Busaiku Damashii"
10.	"On Stage Banter"
11.	"Ore to Hero"
12.	"Yacchatta!"
13.	"Saikou Love!"
14.	"Like a Mt.Fuji: Shori no Dragon"
15.	"Shunkashutou Otokouta"
16.	"Fire & Lightning"
17.	"Body & Soul: Zenshin Zenrei"
18.	"Michishirube"
19.	"Bussassa"
20.	"(Encore)Tana Kara Botamochi"

Special movie

- First edition DVD
  - Concert Tour Documentary
    - Osaka
    - Nagoya
    - Tokyo
    - Sendai
    - Fukuoka
  - Special Program “Busaiku will answer your requests with our body!
- Regurer edition DVD/Blu-ray
  - Special edition "Fire & Lightning" with Masahiro Nakai at Nakano Sunplaza, 31 January 2018

== Extra links ==
- LIVE DVD & Blu-ray Busaikumura no Watto! Odoroku! Dai 1 Show - Avex Trax
- Busaikumura no Watto! Odoroku! Dai 1 Show - Starto Entertainment
- Digest movie on YouTube
