= Ti Ti Ti Terette Teretititi (Dare no Ketsu) =

Single by Busaiku

from the album Busaiku no, Wa!
- Released: July 27, 2014
- Genre: J-pop
- Length: 3:42
- Label: Avex Trax
- Composers: Nakai-san, Miyashita Komuten
- Lyricists: Nakai-san, Miyashita Komuten
- Producer: Masahiro Nakai

Busaiku singles chronology
"Tana Kara Botamochi" (2013)	"Ti Ti Ti Terette Teretititi (Dare no Ketsu)" (2014)	"Yacchatta!!" (2015)

Music video
- "Ti Ti Ti Terette Teretititi (Dare no Ketsu)" on YouTube

"Ti Ti Ti Terette Teretititi (Dare no Ketsu)" is the second single by Japanese boy band Busaiku, released on July 27, 2014, from Avex Trax. It was produced by Masahiro Nakai, following "A gift from heaven".

== Overview ==
The decision to release this song was made after Kis-My-Ft2's flagship TV program "Kiss My Busaiku!" the producer of Busaiku, announced the decision to release this song on "Kiss My Busaiku!". Also, the release date of this song is Sunday, not Wednesday as in the previous song. Like the previous song, the lyrics feature Kis-My-Ft2 members Fujigaya, Kitayama, and Tamamori.

According to Nakai, the song "goes beyond the limits of idols" to make people smile, and the music video featured the members dressed as babies, which was a shocking sight.

Incidentally, Nakai performed this song as "Surume-san" who was borned in the SMAP concert tour "Mr. S -saikou de saikou no Concert Tour-" held in 2014 - 2015 in a comedy corner. Also, Takuya Kimura, Goro Inagaki, Tsuyoshi Kusanagi, and Shingo Katori appear in the lyrics.

== Chart performance ==
On the Oricon Single Daily Chart dated July 26, 2014, the album reached No. 1 with estimated sales of approximately 58,000 copies. On the weekly chart, it recorded estimated sales of 78,000 copies, but was beaten by Exile (Japanese band)'s "New Horizon" to No. 2. Also, because it did not reach No. 1 on the weekly chart, producer Nakai punished it in the August 14, 2014 broadcast of "Kiss My BUSAIKU! on August 14, 2014, and performed Parachuting.

== Editions ==
The song was released in four formats: Regular, First Edition A, First Edition B, and Kiss My Shop Limited Edition. The First Edition A comes with a DVD containing the music video for "Tee-tee-tee-terete teretee (Whose ass)" and the making of the song.

== Track listing ==
=== First press limited edition A contents ===
==== CD ====
1. "Ti Ti Ti Terette Teretititi (Dare no Ketsu)"
2. "Ti Ti Ti Terette Teretititi (Dare no Ketsu)" (Karaoke)

==== DVD ====
1. "Ti Ti Ti Terette Teretititi (Dare no Ketsu)" (Music video)
2. "Ti Ti Ti Terette Teretititi (Dare no Ketsu)" (Making of documentary)

(CD only: First Press Limited Edition B and Special Price Edition)
