= Toshiya Miyata =

Japanese actor, singer, novelist (born 1988)

- 宮田俊哉
- Born: September 14, 1988 (age 38); Kanagawa, Japan
- Other name: Miyacchi
- Occupations: Actor, singer, voice actor, novelist, idol
- Years active: 2001–present
- Agent: Starto Entertainment (Johnny & Associates 2001–2023, Starto Entertainment 2024–present)
- Musical career
- Genre: J-pop
- Instruments: Vocals, piano, drum
- Label: MENT Recording
- Member of: Kis-My-Ft2, Busaiku
- Website: Kis-My-Ft2(Starto Entertainment); Kis-My-Ft2(MENT Recording); Toshiya Miyata on X Toshiya Miyata on Instagram

Toshiya Miyata (Japanese: 宮田俊哉, Hepburn: Toshiya Miyata; born September 14, 1988) is a Japanese singer, actor, TV personality, voice actor, and novelist. He is a member of boy band Kis-My-Ft2 and its sub-unit Busaiku (舞祭組) under Starto Entertainment. His nickname is Miyacchi.

== Early life ==
Miyata was born in 1988 in Yamato City, Kanagawa Prefecture. He comes from the same hometown as Hiroshi Nagano of V6, a senior in his talent agency Johnny & Associates. Miyata attended the same elementary and junior high schools that Nagano had attended, and as a child, he received his first bicycle—purchased by his parents—from the bicycle shop run by Nagano's family, which is well known for operating a bike store.

Since Miyata's mother was a big fan of Koichi Domoto of the Kinki Kids and hoped her son would become a prince-like star like Koichi, she sent Miyata's resume to the Johnny & Associates. After auditioning, Miyata joined Johnny & Associates on February 4, 2001. Wataru Yokoo and Takashi Nikaido, who would later become members of Kis-My-Ft2, also participated in the same audition.

== Career ==
After performing in several trainee groups as a member of Johnny's Jr., Miyata was selected as a member of Kis-My-Ft2 in 2005. he was selected as a member of Kis-My-Ft2 in 2005 and made his CD debut with "Everybody Go" on August 10, 2011, seven years after their formation.

In April 2012, he made his drama debut in the Nippon TV series Shiritsu Bakaleya Kōkō, and in October of the same year, he made his film debut in its film version, Shiritsu Bakaleya Kōkō the Movie (劇場版 私立バカレア高校).

In May 2013, he played his first starring role on stage in Adventure in the Land of Kifsham (キフシャム国の冒険).

In December of the same year, Busaiku was formed from Kis-My-Ft2 with Kento Senga, Wataru Yokoo and Takashi Nikaido produced by Masahiro Nakai, then a member of SMAP.

Even before his debut, he professed his love of anime (self-described 'otaku', or anime geek), which was unusual for an idol at the time. He has also appeared in animated productions as a voice actor, playing the lead role in 2024.

In 2020, Miyata made his voice acting debut in the animated film BEM: Become Human. To prepare for the role, he received professional voice acting training from veteran voice actor Daisuke Namikawa. The lessons were sometimes held late at night due to Miyata's busy schedule with other work. Following this experience, Miyata officially began pursuing a career as a voice actor. Since then, Miyata, who had openly referred to Namikawa as his mentor, expressed his joy in 2024 when he had the opportunity to work alongside Namikawa in the dubbed version of IF, saying he was deeply moved to appear in the same project with him.

The music video for his solo song Nemophila, released on YouTube in May 2021, featured Miyata and Tokiya Ichinose, a character from the multimedia franchise Uta no Prince-sama. As it was unusual for an idol and a character from a game/anime to perform together on the same screen, the music video received a strong response from anime fans.

On August 4, 2023, he opened his personal official X (formerly Twitter) account.

In January 2024, he opened his personal official Instagram. He made his debut as an author with his novel Boundary Melody, in May of the same year.

In June 2025, Miyata made his first solo overseas appearance at Anisama World 2025 in Manila, held in the Philippines. He performed the theme song "Meramera" from the anime Cardfight!! Vanguard, in which he stars as the lead voice actor. He also reunited on stage with Tokiya Ichinose, a character from Uta no Prince-sama, with whom he had previously garnered attention for co-starring in a music video titled "Nemophila". For this appearance, Miyata wore his own Kis-My-Ft2 stage costume, stating that it was driven by his desire to introduce Kis-My-Ft2 to a global audience.

== Anime-related activities ==
=== Wotagei performances ===
Miyata has publicly described himself as an anime enthusiast and is known for performing wotagei, a type of choreographed dance associated with Japanese idol fan culture. In 2015, during Kis-My-Ft2's appearance on the music program Hey! Hey! Hey! Music Champ, when asked by hosts Downtown if he had a special skill, Miyata stepped forward and suddenly began performing wotagei. The other group members pretended to stop him but then joined in, and host Hitoshi Matsumoto also participated, entertaining the audience.

In 2016, during Kis-My-Ft2's concert tour Kis-My-Ft2 Concert Tour 2016 "I Scream", his solo song "Otaku dattatte It's All Right!", composed by Kenichi Maeyamada (Hyadain), featured a performance in which Miyata, accompanied by then–Johnny's Jr. members led by Daisuke Sakuma (Snow Man), energetically showcased wotagei dance moves. The unconventional staging for an idol under Johnny & Associates attracted significant attention at the time.

=== Love for Nana Mizuki and Love Live! ===
Miyata is a fan of voice actress and singer Nana Mizuki, and has admitted to being a member of her fan club. He is also a fan of the popular anime Love Live! and has been selected to host a related program.

One winter in 2014, Miyata stood in line for four hours in heavy snow to buy penlights and merchandise for merchandise at a Love Live! event Due to the snow, trains shut down, forcing Miyata to spend an extra three hours at the station.

Another day during the Spring of 2016, Miyata lied to his agent to take a day off and attend a Love Live! concert wearing a T-shirt from the anime. Miyata's attendance was discovered by his own fans at the concert, who posted about his appearance on social media. Upon returning, Miyata was scolded by his managers who told him "You are the one whom your fans being obsessed with, so it's not right for you are obsessed with someone else". Miyata had plans to attend a Nana Mizuki concert the following week and still went without notifying his agency, resulting in another scolding from them.

Aside from these well-known stories, he is often seen making private visits to Comiket venues and anime events. He is close with Daisuke Sakuma of Snow Man due to their shared love for anime, and have been since their trainee days. Miyata and Sakuma have been called the "Miyata faction". Since beginning his voice acting activities, Miyata is said to have hit it off with several fellow voice actors, most notably anime song singer Masayoshi Ōishi and voice actor Shugo Nakamura. He has also appeared with them on streaming programs and radio shows that he hosts.

=== Cosplay ===
Miyata has also ventured into full-fledged cosplay, a popular form of costume play among Japanese anime fans. Ahead of the photoshoot, Miyata solicited cosplay ideas from his followers on X (Twitter). For the October 2025 issue of Cosplay Mode magazine, released in September 2025, he appeared dressed as an original character with silver hair, wearing a purple costume inspired by his own Kis-My-Ft2 member color. The photoshoot received positive feedback from fans, leading to his appearance as a special guest at the Ikebukuro Halloween Cosplay Festival 2025, one of Japan’s largest cosplay events, held on October 25, 2025, in Tokyo. Miyata appeared in costume as the same original character, delighting both cosplay enthusiasts and his own fans in attendance. The event was also attended by the mayor of Toshima Ward, who joined dressed as Nausicaä from Nausicaä of the Valley of the Wind.

In 2017, Miyata appeared as Ruby Kurosawa, a female character from the anime Love Live! Sunshine!!, when all members of Kis-My-Ft2 performed on a TV music program dressed as women. At the time, the reaction from those around him was reportedly not very positive. At the Ikebukuro Halloween Cosplay Festival 2025, Miyata heard fans express interest in seeing more of his cosplay, and he stated that he hoped to one day portray characters from his favorite works, such as the Final Fantasy video game series or Kurapika from the manga Hunter × Hunter.

=== Regarding Vanguard starring ===
It was announced in December 2023 that Miyata would voice Akina Myodo, the lead character for the anime Cardfight!! Vanguard Divinez, which would air from January of the following year. Bushiroad President Takaaki Kidani said that he first became aware of Miyata at a 2016 Love Live! event at a 2016 Sunshine City, Tokyo, where he heard about a TV personality who stood in line for three hours to buy merchandise, and that is how he came to know him. He also said that the story starring Miyata had been warming up for a year, but when the Johnny & Associates held a press conference in September 2023 admitting the founder's guilt, Miyata's appointment was temporarily in jeopardy since the anime would broadcast around the world. However, Kidani said that Japanese animation industry has so far been indebted to Miyata, and that although many people in the world suddenly change their attitudes for the talent of Johnny's, he wanted to deal with Miyata as a human being, not as "J" (Johnny's), and decided to appoint him as originally planned. Miyata talked about this story on his radio program Burn! Radio, he revealed that he had been spending anxious days at the time, and that he was "really saved" when Kidani said he wanted to work with him on the project.

== Discography ==
=== Solo and small group songs ===
Song title	Lylic	Conposer	Name	Album	Note
Solo songs
"Otaku Dattatte It's All Right!" (Even if you are a geek, it's all right!)	Kenichi Maeyamada	Kenichi Maeyamada	Toshiya Miyata by Kis-My-Ft2	Album I Scream (4cup ver.)	Official Live Video on YouTube
"Beautiful days"	Toshiya Miyata	Rock Stone	Toshiya Miyata; Dream boys Jet; Dream boys 2014	DVD Dream Boys	
"Boku Dakeno Princess" (My Own Princess)	Megumi Hayashibara	Takahiro Yamada	Toshiya Miyata	Album Free Hugs!	
"Nemophila"	Toshiya Miyata; Tokiya Ichinose	Noriyasu Agematsu	Toshiya Miyata	Live DVD/Blu-ray Live Tour 2021 Home bonus CD "Kis-My-Ft2 10th Anniversary Extra CD" Toshiya Miyata feat. Tokiya Ichinose (STRISH); Single Fear/So Blue (First edition A)	Official Music Video – YouTube
"Champions"	Toshiya Miyata	Ohrn Andreas Jakob Erik; Smith Henrik Martin	Toshiya Miyata; Dream boys	Live DVD/Blu-ray Live Tour 2021 Home bonus CD	
"Otaku Dattatte It's All Right! -Gaiden" (Another Story of "Even if you are a geek, it's all right!")	Kenichi Maeyamada	Kenichi Maeyamada	Toshiya Miyata	Album Music Colosseum	
Small group songs
"Catch & Go!!"	ENA	Chokkaku; Syb; Iggy	Kis-My-Ft2 (Wataru Yokoo, Toshiya Miyata, Takashi Nikaido and Kento Senga)	Album Kis-My-1st	
"Sing for you"	Takashi Ueda; Hiroya.T	Dr Hardcastle youwhich Daichi	Kis-My-Ft2 (Yuta Tamamori, Toshiya Miyata and Kento Senga)	Album Kis-My-1st	
"Forza!"	Hikari	Hikari; Stephan Elfgren	Kis-My-Ft2 (Yuta Tamamori with Wataru Yokoo, Toshiya Miyata, Takashi Nikaido and Kento Senga)	Album Good Ikuze!	
"Chance Chance Baybee"	Takuya Harada	Takuya Harada; Samuel Wearmo	Kis-My-Ft2 (Wataru Yokoo, Toshiya Miyata, Takashi Nikaido and Kento Senga)	Album Good Ikuze!	
"Be Love"	miyakei	youwhich L-m-T	Yuta Tamamori and Toshiya Miyata	Album Kis-My-World	The first drama project of "Kiss My Doki Doki!"
"Snack Show Wa"	Shingo Asari	Shingo Asari	Hiromitsu Kitayama, Wataru Yokoo and Toshiya Miyata	Single Sha la la Summer Time	One of these songs, "Cinema for Men and Women," is Miyata's solo.
"Hoshi ni Negaiwo" (Wish upon a star)	YU-G	YU-G; Jun Suyama	Yuta Tamamori and Toshiya Miyata	Single Love	
"Destiny"	YU-G	Noriyasu Agematsu	Yuta Tamamori and Toshiya Miyata	Album To-y2	
"Shindo"	Yoshifumi Kanamaru	Kanata Okajima, Hayato Yamamoto, pw.a	Yuta Tamamori and Toshiya Miyata	Single Curtain Call	

== Filmography ==
=== Films ===
- Shiritsu Bakaleya Kōkō — The Movie (2012), Junichi Koba
- Tsugaru Lacquer Girl (2023), Naoto Suzuki
- Romantic Killer (2025)

=== Television drama ===
- Shiritsu Bakaleya Kōkō (April 14, 2012 – June 30, 2012, Nippon TV) – Junichi Koba
- Sekai ni Bizarre Story '13 Autumn Special Edition "0.03 Frame Woman" (October 12, 2013, Fuji TV) – Satoshi Kariya
- Shinbei with Child – (November 13 – December 18, 2015, NHK BS Premium) – Seizaburo Enokido
- Shinbei with Child season2 (November 11 – December 23, 2016, NHK BS Premium) – Seizaburo Enokido
- Monday Golden Public Prosecutor's Office Clerk, Kuroyuri (February 22, 2016, TBS Television (Japan)) – Naoki Munakata
- Monday Golden Private Forensic Investigation: Kirino Mai's Murder Appraisal – (March 14, 2016, TBS Television (Japan)) – Kenta Asakura
- XXX People's Lives – (April 24 [midnight on April 23] – June 26 (midnight on June 25), 2018, Nippon TV) – as Yoichi Mano, the group lead (starring in a quartet with Wataru Yokoo, Takashi Nikaido and Kento Senga)
- Yasuragi no Toki – Michi – (April 8, 2019 – March 27, 2020, TV Asahi) – as Kouji Negoro
- Midsummer Boy – 19452020 Final Episode (September 18, 2020, TV Asahi)
- Karei-naru Ichizoku (April 18, 2021 – July 4, 2021, Wowow) – Kazuya Hosokawa
- Doctor White – (January 17, 2022 – March 21, 2022, Kansai Telecasting Corporation/Fuji TV) – Junpei Okumura
- Doctor White Special Edition (March 28, 2022, Kansai Telecasting Corporation/Fuji TV)
- Nice Flight! -Final episode (September 9, 2022, TV Asahi) – Ryo Enomoto
- Smiling Lady episode 4 (August 17, 2024, Tōkai Television Broadcasting, Fuji Television) – Kanzaki Doguma

=== Streaming drama ===
- Be Love – (October 16 – November 6, 2020, Lemino(dTV)) – Editor

=== Animation Works ===
- Delicious Party Pretty Cure (June 5, 2022 – January 29, 2023, TV Asahi) – Yuan Kasai and Mitsuki Kasai (two roles)
- BanG Dream! It's MyGO!!!!! Episode 6, compilation (July 20, 2023, September 7, 2023, Tokyo MX, etc.) – as Yuji Takamatsu, compilation narration.
- Cardfight!! Vanguard Divinez (January 2024 – , TV Tokyo) – Starring Akina Myodo
  - Cardfight!! Vanguard Divinez season2 (July 2024–, TV Tokyo) – Starring Akina Myodo
  - Cardfight!! Vanguard Divinez deluxe arc (January 2025 -, TV Tokyo) – Starring Akina Myodo
- Kinnikuman Perfect Origin Arc (July 2024 – Chubu-Nippon Broadcasting and TBS Television (Japan) affiliate) – Black Hole
  - Kinnikuman Perfect Origin Arc season2 (January 2025 -) – Black Hole
- Party kara Tsuihō Sareta Sono Chiyushi, Jitsu wa Saikyō ni Tsuki (October 2024 – Asahi Broadcasting Corporation and TV Asahi) – Hanzam
- I'm the Evil Lord of an Intergalactic Empire! (April 6, 2025 –) – Liam Sera Banfield (previous life)
- Private Tutor to the Duke's Daughter (July 5, 2025 –) – Gerard Wainwright
- Toilet-Bound Hanako-kun Season 2 (August 24, 2025 -) – Katakuri
- Ace of the Diamond act II Season 2 (April, 2026 -) – Kōji Senmaru
- I'm Looking for Zombies (October 2026 –) – Haru
- Super Psychic Policeman Chojo (October 2026 –) – Hajime Keinain
- As a Reincarnated Aristocrat, I'll Use My Appraisal Skill to Rise in the World III (October 2026 –) – Rikuya Fujimiya

=== Animated feature film ===
- BEM: Become Human (October 2, 2020, The Klockworx Co., Ltd.) – Burgess
- Eiga Senpai wa Otokonoko: Ame Nochi Hare (February 14, 2025, Aniplex) – Hiroshi Hongo

=== Dubbing ===
- IF -(June 14, 2024, Paramount Pictures, Toho-Towa Co.Ltd.) – Blue
- Hoppers-(March 13, 2026, The Walt Disney Company) – Loaf

== Live Performances ==
- Ikemen desu ne – (April 8, 2011 – May 8, 2011)
- Adventure in the Land of Kifsham – (May 18 – June 23, 2013) – Prince Ilima (leading role)
- Dream Boy (January, 2004)
- Dream Boy (January, 2006)
- Dream Boy (September, 2007)
- Dream Boy (April, 2008)
- Dream Boy – (September, 2012)
- Dream Boy – (September, 2013) – Miyata
- Dream Boy – (September, 2014) – Toshiya
- Dream Boy – (September, 2015) – Toshiya
- Dream Boy – (September, 2016) – Toshiya
- Dream Boy – (September, 2018) – Toshiya
- The End of the XXX People – The "XX" Choice We Made – Toshiyuki (February 9–26, 2020)
- Music Theater Great Pretender – (July 4 – August 8, 2021) – Makoto Edamura "Edamame"(Leading role)
- Drama and musical Momo – Performed as Beppo at the Fujisawa Civic Hall (December 13, 2025)
- Hamlet (Mikikura no Kai special performance) – Scheduled to perform in this production at Teatro Girolio Showa (March 3, 2026)

=== Other Live Performances ===
- NicoNico Super Party (October 2022, Saitama Super Arena)
- Animelo Summer Live 2024 -Stargazer- (August 2024, Saitama Super Arena)
- Anisama World 2025 in Manila (July 10, 2025, Araneta Coliseum, Manila, Philippines)

== Other activities ==
For activities as a member of Kis-My-Ft2, see Kis-My-Ft2#Group activities.

=== Novel ===
- Kyōkai no Melody- ASCII Media Works – (24 May 2024)

=== Radio ===
- Burn! Radio – FM Yokohama (April 2019 -)

=== Live streaming ===
- Kismai Miyata no niko-nama yattatte It's All Right! – (May 24, 2022 – , niconico Live(ニコニコ生放送)) – Regularly broadcasts once a month

=== YouTube ===
- After School Gaming Life (放課後 Gaming Life) – (The title was changed from "Johnny's Gaming Room" Oct. 2023) – (December 16, 2021 -) – Miyata was chosen as one of the main host member with Yuta Tamamori and Daiki Arioka.

=== Commercial ===
- Line (software) – "Line Poko Poko (Line ポコポコ)" – (September 2016– with Yuta Tamamori)
- Aderans Company Limited
  - Hair dryer "Kamiga" (May 2021 -)
  - Image character for hair growth for men (September 2024 -)
- BanG Dream! Girls Band Party! (March 10, 2023 – )

=== Concert ===
- NicoNicoChoParty – (October 16, 2022, Saitama Super Arena) Performed as a surprise guest
- Animelo Summer Live 2024 -Stargazer- (August 30, 2024, Saitama Super Arena) – Performed as a solo artist
