= Kento Senga =

Japanese actor and singer (born 1991)

- 千賀 健永
- Born: March 23, 1991 (age 35); Nagoya, Aichi, Japan
- Other name: Sen-chan
- Occupations: Singer, actor, artist, idol
- Years active: 2003–present
- Agent: Starto Entertainment (Johnny & Associates 2002–2023, Starto Entertainment 2024–present)
- Musical career
- Genres: J-pop
- Instruments: Vocals, piano
- Label: MENT Recording
- Member of: Kis-My-Ft2, Busaiku

YouTube information
- Channel: Kento Senga
- Years active: 2025–present
- Genre: Cosmetology
- Subscribers: 128 thousand
- Views: 9.8 million
- Last updated: January 4, 2026

Kento Senga (Japanese: 千賀健永, Hepburn: Kento Senga; born March 23, 1991) is a Japanese singer, actor and artist who is a member of boy band Kis-My-Ft2 and its derivative group Busaiku(舞祭組) under Starto Entertainment. His nickname is Sen-chan.

== History ==
Senga was born in Atsuta-ku, Nagoya, Aichi Prefecture. He grew up in an affluent family and, following his mother's encouragement, tried various extracurricular activities. However, he became most passionate about dancing, which he started at the age of three.

Senga was so passionate that he ended up attending four different dance schools in Nagoya. In third grade, after watching Michael Jackson's music video for "Bad", he was inspired to become a cool artist like him. When he was in fifth grade, his mother, who was acquainted with Sho Sakurai's friend from Arashi, took him to an Arashi concert. He was impressed by the stage design and special effects, which reminded him of a Michael Jackson live show. This experience inspired him to audition for Johnny & Associates.

After auditioning, he joined Johnny & Associates on April 13, 2003, at the age of 12.

Senga, who said that Johnny Kitagawa told him, "If you come to Tokyo, I’ll let you debut," moved from Nagoya to Tokyo with his mother because he wanted to debut as soon as possible. In 2005, he was selected as a member of Kis-My-Ft2 and began his activities. In 2007, he was also chosen to join the dance group Butoukan alongside Tomoyuki Yara and others, due to his strong dance skills, but the group never made a formal debut. At the time he joined Johnny & Associates, Senga believed he would be able to debut quickly. However, it ultimately took eight years from the time he moved to Tokyo before Kis-My-Ft2 made their CD debut with Everybody Go on August 10, 2011, seven years after their formation. Senga later spoke about how this long wait caused his mother a great deal of concern.

After his debut, Senga spent a period of time with little exposure, but noticing this, his senior at Johnny's, Masahiro Nakai, produced the formation of Busaiku. As a member of the group, Senga began activities alongside fellow Kis-My-Ft2 members Takashi Nikaido, Toshiya Miyata, and Wataru Yokoo.

Senga made his first film appearance in Kadokawa movie Bi-location released on January 18, 2014, playing the role of Takumi Mitarai in a dual role.

In 2020, on the Kis-My-Ft2 variety show Kis-My-Busaiku!?, there was a segment where members were asked to improvise a scene based on the question, "What would you do if a small child were being noisy in a restaurant during a date?" During his turn, Senga gave a slight smirk, leaned in toward the child, and said, "Hey, you're loud. (Omaesa, Urusaindayo.) I'll show you the scariest thing you've ever experienced." Though his response was unexpectedly intense and far from the typical charming image, it stood out to viewers for its dark humor. This moment earned him the nickname "Omauru Niki," which loosely translates to "The 'Hey, you're loud' guy."

This unexpected performance marked a turning point in his acting career. In 2024, he was cast in a drama as one of the main characters—a wealthy but morally flawed husband who cheats on and mistreats his wife, only to face harsh revenge. His memorable line, "Hey, you're loud (Omaesa, Urusaindayo)," was even brought back in the drama as a nod to the moment that first gained him attention.

Senga often uses his dance skills to choreograph songs for Kis-My-Ft2. He has also choreographed songs for the junior group Travis Japan.

Senga is also an artist. Senga began drawing as a way to cope with the frustration he felt in the early days after his debut, when he wasn't actively promoted within the group. Despite his strong dance skills, he was often made to perform on the sidelines, which added to his frustration. At first, he simply enjoyed drawing and did it as a hobby in the dressing room on his iPad. However, after the members of Kis-My-Ft2 saw his work and encouraged him to hold an exhibition, he began to take drawing more seriously. His character FiNGA-kun, which features hands and fingers as its motif, was inspired by choreography.

In 2023 he held a solo exhibition FiNGAiSM which featured over 110 works in Tokyo and Taiwan.

In March 2025, he launched his personal YouTube channel focused on cosmetology, titled "千賀健永 (Kento Senga) / Kento Senga," and on March 23, his birthday, he held a live stream as the first video on the channel.

== Commitment to cosmetology ==
Senga's mother is a beautician who runs an esthetic salon, and because of her influence, he began applying lotion to his face in the third grade of elementary school. Senga is particular about lotion and uses as many as 11 different bottles, which is mentioned in the lyrics of the song We are Kis-My-Ft2, which introduces the members. Senga often says, "I don't do beauty regimens without evidence," and only practices cosmetology regimens that have evidence. When choosing cosmetics, he says he checks the list of ingredients on the back of the package before purchasing.

In August 2021, when he appeared as Kis-My-Ft2 on FNS Laugh & Music, a live singing program hosted by Masahiro Nakai, a senior of Johnny's, Nakai revealed that Senga had injected hyaluronic acid into his cheeks, which made the Internet This became news. Later, on another talk show, Senga blurted out, "I am Nakai's junior, but I wanted him to get my permission before talking about it," but Nakai said he was glad it was a topic of conversation and was popular. Perhaps because of this, Senga has been increasingly invited as a guest on beauty programs in recent years, often giving advice to female guests. 2024 saw the release of a face pack that he produced himself. He is friends with Matt Kuwata, a model and TV personality known for his unique makeup, and they exchange information on the latest beauty methods and beauty equipment.

== Discography ==
Title	lyrics	Composition	Name	Recorded by	Note
Solo songs
"Get Ready"	Komei Kobayashi	Fredrik "Figge" Bostrom; MiNE; Atsushi Shimada	Kis-My-Ft2; Kento Senga	Album I Scream (4cups)	He created the costumes for the music video himself.。 Live Video on YouTube
"Bomb"	Kento.S	Tommy Clin; MiNE; Atsushi Shimada	Kento Senga; Dream Boys JET; Dream Boys 2014	DVD Dream Boys (First Edition BonusCD)	
"I miss your smile"	Kaname Kawabata (Chemistry)	Kyler Niko; Kanata Okajima; Soma Genda	Kis-My-Ft2; Kento Senga	Album Free Hugs! (Normal Edition)	
"Exit"	Yuki Shirai	Masatomo Ohta	Kento Senga	Album Best of Kis-My-Ft2 (First Edition B)	
"Buzz"	Kento Senga	Kento Senga	Kento Senga	LiveDVD/Blu-ray Live Tour 2021 Home (Normal Edition BonusCD); Single Fear/So Blue (First Edition A, MV)	He handles everything from songwriting, music videos, choreography, and casting.。
"Fragrance"	Komei Kobayashi	Meyers Warren David; Stodart Scott Russell; Thomson Mark Angelico	Kento Senga; Dream Boys	LiveDVD/Blu-ray Live Tour 2021 Home (Normal Edition BonusCD)	Choreographer for the 2018 and 2019 editions of the stage production of Dream Boys。
"Pure Love"	Shingo Asari	Shingo Asari	Kento Senga; Kis-My-Ft2	Album Music Colosseum (First Edition B BonusDVD)	
Small group songs, other songs
"Catch & Go!!"	Ena	Chokkaku; Syb; Iggy	Kis-My-Ft2	Album Kis-My-1st – Wataru Yokoo, Toshiya Miyata, Takashi Nikaido and Kento Senga	
"Sing for you"	Tatsuji Ueda; Hiroya.T	Dr Hardcastle youwhich Daichi	Kis-My-Ft2	Album Kis-My-1st – Yuta Tamamori, Toshiya Miyata and Kento Senga	
"Forza!"	Hikari	Hikari; Stephan Elfgren	Kis-My-Ft2	Album Good Ikuze! – Yuta Tamamori with Wataru Yokoo, Toshiya Miyata, Takashi Nikaido and Kento Senga	
"Chance Chance Baybee"	Takuya Harada	Takuya Harada; Samuel Wearmo	Kis-My-Ft2	Album Good Ikuze! – Wataru Yokoo, Toshiya Miyata, Takashi Nikaido and Kento Senga	
"Double Up"	Komei Kobayashi	Kei Kwangwook Lim; Ryan Kim; CR; Chase	Takashi Nikaido; Kento Senga; Kis-My-Ft2	Album Kis-My-World – Takashi Nikaido and Kento Senga	
"2 in 7 billion"	Shikata	Shikata; Kay	Kis-My-Ft2; Takashi Nikaido; Kento Senga	Single Sha la la Summer Time (First edition B) – Takashi Nikaido and Kento Senga	
"ConneXion"	Taisuke Fujigaya	Kanata Okajima; Soma Genda	Taisuke Fujigaya, Kento Senga and Wataru Yokoo; Kis-My-Ft2	Single Love (Normal Edition) – Taisuke Fujigaya, Kento Senga and Wataru Yokoo	The video was made as a drama project of Kis-My Doki Doki.。
"Butterflies of the Kingdom"	Itsuki Natsui; Wataru Yokoo	baku	Wataru Yokoo, Kento Senga/Kis-My-Ft2; Kis-My-Ft2	Album To-y2 (Normal Edition) – Wataru Yokoo and Kento Senga	
"Yummy, lovely night"	TSINGTAO; Samuel Kim; Sorato	TSINGTAO; Samuel Kim; Sorato	Taisuke Fujigaya, Kento Senga and Wataru Yokoo by Kis-My-Ft2	"Curtain Call" (regular edition)	

== Choreography ==
Kis-My-Ft2

- "She! Her! Her!"
- "I Scream Night"
- "Sakura Hirari"
- "Shake It Up"

- "Eternal Mind"
- "Tonight"
- "Count 7even"
- "Girl is mine"

- "Break The Chains"
- "Rebirth Stage"
- "Tomoni"

Kis-My-Ft2 Small group song
- "ConneXion"
Kento Senga solo song
- "Buzz"
Musical Dream Boys
- "Fragrance"
Travis Japan
- "Lock Lock"
- "Take it! Make it!"
IMPACTors (Trainee group)
- "Cool Don't Lie"

== Filmography ==
=== TV drama ===
- Keigo Higashino Mysteries Episode 7 "White Weapon"(東野圭吾ミステリーズ) (August 23, 2012, Fuji TV) – Shinji Nakamachi
- Psychosomatic Therapy -in the Room-(心療中-in the Room-) (January 12, 2013 – March 30, 2013, NTV) – Ren Kitahara
- A Chef of Nobunaga 2 Episode 7 (August 28, 2014, TV Asahi) – As Sadahiro Azumi
- Heisei Busaiku Otoko (平成舞祭組男) (October 18, 2014 – January 4, 2015, Nippon TV) – Kento Senga
- Gekijo in Red and Black (赤と黒のゲキジョー) Asami Mitsuhiko Series 51: Median Tectonic Zone" (December 5, 2014, Fuji TV) – Detective Sudo
- "XXX" People's Lives(○○な人の末路) (April 24 [midnight on April 23] – June 26 [midnight on June 25], 2018, NTV) – Takeyuki Wada
- Miller Twins Season 2(ミラー・ツインズ Season2) Episode 1 (June 8, 2019, Wowow) – the club manager
- Detective Hoshikamo(探偵☆星鴨) Episode 6 (May 30, 2021 [June 1, midnight], Nippon TV) – Tatsuru Yomota
- Recipe for a Happy Couple -One Night Exchange?(夫婦円満レシピ) – (October 6, 2022 – December 22, 2022, TV Tokyo) – Kosuke Nishina
- Marriage Activity 1000 bon knock (婚活1000本ノック) Episodes 5 & 6 (February 14 & 21, 2024, Fuji TV) – Tomoya Ishikawa as Yagio / Tomoya Ishikawa
- Aijin Tensei – The cheated wife takes revenge after she dies (愛人転生 – サレ妻は死んだ後に転生する) (September 6, 2024, Mainichi Broadcasting System, TBS Television) – Starring as Yuta Mayama (Starring with Kaon)
- Kanojo Ga Soremo Ai To Yobunara (彼女がそれも愛と呼ぶなら) (April 2025, Nippon TV, Yomiuri TV) – Ao Karakubo
- Replica: Motozuma no Fukushū (Replica: Revenge of the Ex-Wife) (July 2025, TV Tokyo) – Mirai Kiritani

=== Film ===
- Bilocation (バイロケーション 表 / 裏) – (January 18 and February 1, 2014, Kadokawa Pictures, Inc.) – Takumi Mitarashi

== Live performances ==
- Takizawa Kabuki (2011, Nissay Theatre）
- Dream Boys (2012, Imperial Theatre (Japan))
- Dream Boys JET (2013, Imperial Theatre (Japan)) – Senga
- Dream Boys (2014, Imperial Theatre (Japan)) – Kento
- Dream Boys – (2015, Imperial Theatre (Japan)) – Kento
- Dream Boys – (2016, Imperial Theatre (Japan)) – Kento
- Dream Boys – (2018, Imperial Theatre (Japan)) – Kento
- Moshimo Juku（April 5 and 7, 2019、Panasonic Globe Theatre / May 25 and 26 2019, Hagi Civic Center, Main Hall)

== Other activities ==
For activities as a member of Kis-My-Ft2, see Kis-My-Ft2#Group activities.

=== TV ===
- Kaitai Kingdom (解体キングダム) – (April 5, 2023 – , NHK)

=== Commercial ===
- YC Primarily "Love Chrome" (March 23, 2022 – )
- Esmod Art "Begskin Science" (February 2024 – ) – Face pack image character

=== Art event ===
- FiNGAiSM (May 19 – June 4, 2023, Omotesando Hills Space O, Tokyo)
- FiNGAiSM in Taipei (December 1–10, 2023, Huashan 1914 Cultural and Creative Industrial Park, West Hall 1, Taiwan)
- FiNGAiSM in Harajuku (July 27 – August 25, 2024, JPS Gallery, Tokyo)
- FiNGAiSM in Nagoya (September 7 – October 13, 2024, Blackbird Gallery, Nagoya)
- JPS Gallery Group Exhibition (October 5 – 23, 2024, Paradise City, Incheon, South Korea) – participated with FiNGAiSM
- FiNGAiSM in Shibuya (March 23 – April 12, 2025, Creative Space Akademeia21 Harajuku, Shibuya, Tokyo)
- Coin Parking Delivery x FiNGAiSM (July 19–20, 2025, Shibuya, Tokyo)
- Essence of Love (July 25 – August 24, 2025, Whitestone Gallery, Seoul, South Korea)
- FiNGAiSM in London (October 16–19, 2025, Saatchi Gallery, London, UK)
