= Love (Kis-My-Ft2 song) =

Single by Kis-My-Ft2

from the album Best of Kis-My-Ft2
- B-side: "Because I Love You"
- Released: July 11, 2018 (Japan)
- Genre: J-pop
- Label: Avex Trax

Kis-My-Ft2 singles chronology
"You & Me" (2018)	"Love" (2018)	"Kimi, Boku" (2018)

Music video
- "Love" on YouTube "Because I Love You" (Dance Edition) on YouTube

"Love" is the 21st single by Japanese boy band Kis-My-Ft2, released on July 11, 2018, by Avex Trax.

== Overview ==
The theme of this album is “Marugoto Love Song" (The whole thing is a love song.), and each song in the album is a song about love in its various forms.

It was released in three forms: First edition, A/B, and Regular disc. The DVD of the first edition A includes the music video for "Love" and "Kis-My-Ft2's Funny Sports Championship." In contrast, the DVD of the first edition B consists of the music video for "Because I Love You," and the DVD of "Ura Yummy! (Moments of Another Kis-Matsu-So)" will be included. The regular edition includes three-unit songs. This is the first time a unit song has been included on a single in two years.

"Love" is a commercial song for Kowa's "Unakowa Cool," in which the members appear."Because I Love You” is a commercial song for Daiichi Kosho Company's "Live Dam Stadium," and is an emotional ballad about her painful feelings of being too young to love as a student. The music video “Dance Edition” features dance.

"Love" and "Because I Love You" made their television premieres on the July 7, 2018, broadcasts of Nippon TV's "The Music Day: The Song You Want to Tell" and TBS Television (Japan)'s "Count Down TV" on the same day, respectively.

== Chart performance ==
The song reached No. 1 on the Oricon Weekly Chart dated July 23, 2018. This was their 21st consecutive No. 1 ranking since their debut single “Everybody Go”. The single also topped the Billboard Japan Hot 100.

The special single "You & Me" released on April 25, 2018, was sold exclusively on Seven Net, so it is not counted in the Oricon count. CD first-week sales: 175,655 (Oricon total). By December 9, 2018, the album had sold a total of 197,737 copies and ranked 33rd on the 2018 annual Oricon Album Ranking.

== Track listing ==
=== CD ===
- Regular Edition
1. "Love" (3:40)
2. "ConneXion" (3:47) song by Taisuke Fujigaya, Kento Senga and Wataru Yokoo
3. "Hoshi ni Negai wo" (lit. "Wish Upon a Star") (4:53) song by Yuta Tamamori and Toshiya Miyata
4. "Happy Birthday" (1:33) song by Hiromitsu Kitayama and Takashi Nikaido
- First Edition A/B
1. "Love"
2. "Because I Love You" (3:20)

=== DVD ===
- First Edition A
1. "Love" Music Video
2. "Love" Music Video making document
3. Kis-My-Ft2's Funny sports championship with roller skate
- First Edition B
1. "Because I Love You" Music Video (Dance Edition)
2. "Because I Love You" Music Video (Making Document)
3. The making of "Because I Love You" MUSIC VIDEO (Dance Edition)
4. "Yummy behind the scenes!" (Moments from the other side of the Kismatsuso apartment)
