= Hiromitsu Kitayama =

Japanese idol, singer and actor (born 1985)

- 北山 宏光
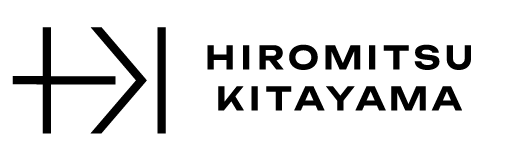
- Logo of Hiromitsu Kitayama
- Born: 17 September 1985 (age 41); Kanagawa, Japan
- Occupations: Singer; actor; television personality
- Years active: 2002–present -
- Agent: Tobe
- Musical career
- Genre: J-pop
- Labels: Avex Trax; MENT Recording; Tobe Music
- Formerly of: Kis-My-Ft2
- Website: tobe-official.jp/artists/hiromitsukitayama

Hiromitsu Kitayama (北山宏光, Kitayama Hiromitsu; born September 17, 1985) is a Japanese idol, singer and actor, under Tobe, former member of Johnny & Associates boy band Kis-My-Ft2. Kitayama has also appeared in many television drama series such as Kazoku Gari (as Suzuki Keitoku) and in musicals such as Let's Sing a Song of Love (celebrating 40 years of Kansai TV). Kitayama left the group and the agency on 31 August 2023.

== History ==
=== Early life and education ===
Kitayama was a sports-oriented youth who devoted himself to football until his junior high school years. He entered Horikoshi High School, which is well known for its entertainment course, through a soccer-based recommendation. At the time, Kitayama was unaware that the school had an entertainment course or that many entertainers attended it; however, he later recalled realizing the presence of celebrity classmates when students with flamboyantly dyed hair entered the hall during the entrance ceremony. Influenced by his classmate Tomohisa Yamashita, who was already active in the entertainment industry, Kitayama auditioned for Johnny & Associates and joined the agency in 2002, during his second year of high school and subsequently entered the entertainment industry.

=== Career at Johnny & Associates (Kis-My-Ft2) ===
After being selected for several Johnny’s Jr. groups, he was chosen as a member of Kis-My-Ft. in 2004. Following lineup changes, the group was reorganized as Kis-My-Ft2 in 2005. As Kis-My-Ft2, they worked as backup dancers for KAT-TUN and other artists before making their CD debut as a group with the single “Everybody Go” in August 2011. He graduated from Asia University in 2008.

Within Kis-My-Ft2, Kitayama made use of his vocal skills and often sang key parts of the group’s songs alongside Taisuke Fujigaya.

=== Departure from Johnny & Associates ===
On August 31, 2023, he left Kis-My-Ft2 in order to pursue an individual career and also departed from Johnny & Associates.

=== Tobe ===
On 13 September 2023, a teaser video with the name "#Tobecontinued" was released on TOBE's official YouTube. The new artist was to be revealed on the 17, but voices in X (formerly Twitter) were already guessing the identity of the new member to be Kitayama, who had recently left Johnny's. On 17 September 2023, Kitayama's identity was revealed, introducing him as TOBE's latest member. In the same video, his SNS and fanclub information was also shared. He made his solo debut on 17 November with the release of the digital single "乱心-Ranshin-" (Ranshin=Ranshin).

On December 20, 2025, it was announced that TOBE joined with Pony Canyon to establish new label "RED ON". The label, whose name, "RED", takes the meaning "Resonance", "Expression", and "Destiny", aims to open up new possibilities for artistic expression in the domestic and international music scene. Kitayama is its first artist, after transferring from Tobe Music.

== Career ==
=== With Johnny and Associates ===
==== Filmography ====
===== Dramas =====
- Misaki Number One!! (NTV / 2011) – Minato Ryosuke
- Beginners! | Biginazu! (TBS / 2012) – Tachibana Danji
- Kasuka na Kanojo (Fuji TV / 2013) – Hayashi Kunihiko
- 2013-Saibanchou! Onaka ga sukimashita! – Nita Seigi
- Kazoku Gari (TBS / 2014) – Suzuki Keitoku

===== Solo TV shows =====
- July 2012 – J's Journey-Solo Back Pack Trip Across India
- April 2013 – 10000 Yen Per Month Challenge
- 15 August 2024 - Tobe Live at Ariake Arena: Hiromitsu Kitayama "Ranshin" (Episode 2)

===== Film =====
- Tiger: My Life as a Cat (2019), Suzuo "Tora-san" Takahata
- Hyoketsu (2026), Minoru

===== Video games =====
- Akiba Lost (2026), Daiki Shinjo

==== Discography (Solos) ====
- Sanagi (Kis-My-1st)
- Rock U (Good Ikuze!)
- Give Me... (Good Ikuze!)
- FORM (Kis-My-Journey)

==== Radio ====
- October 14, 2013~Present Nanikita (Nanikin)

=== With Tobe ===
==== Filmography ====
===== TV dramas =====
Year	Title	Role	Ref.
2024	Kimi ga Kemono ni Naru Mae ni	Hajime Kanzaki	

==== Discography ====
===== Albums =====
Year	Title	Format	Ref.
2024	Zoo	CD+Blu-Ray, CD, Digital	

===== Singles =====
Year	Title	Format	Notes	Ref.
2023	Ranshin-Ranshin- (乱心-RANSHIN-)	Digital		
2023	Joker	Digital		
2023	Ranshin / Joker	CD + Blu-Ray, CD		
2024	Bet	Digital		
2024	Bet / Beast	CD+Blu-Ray, CD		

===== Other songs =====
Year	Title	Notes	Ref.
2023	NE:Ø era	Included in "Ranshin/Joker" Limited edition A	
2023	YOU & I	Included in "Ranshin/Joker" Limited edition B	
2023	In the red night (赤い夜に (Akai yoru ni))	Included in "Ranshin/Joker" Regular edition	
2024	ink.	Included in "Bet/Beast" Limited edition A	
2024	Soreta ryūsei-gun (逸れた流星群)	Included in "Bet/Beast" Limited edition B	
2024	Violet	Included in "Bet/Beast" Limited edition B	
2024	Totonotte	Included in "Bet/Beast" Limited edition C	

===== EP =====
Year	Title	Format	Notes	Ref.
2025	Just Like That-Special Edition-	Digital		

===== Music videos =====
Year	Title	Ref.
2023	乱心-Ranshin-（Official Music Video)	
2023	Joker（Official Music Video)	
2024	Bet (Official Music Video)	
2024	In the red night (赤い夜に (Akai yoru ni)) (Official Lyric Video)	
2024	The Beast (Official Music Video)	
2024	Comic (Official Music Video)	
