= Best of Kis-My-Ft2 =

Greatest hits album by Kis-My-Ft2
- Released: August 10, 2021
- Genre: J-pop
- Label: Avex Trax

Kis-My-Ft2 chronology
To-y2 (2020)	Best of Kis-My-Ft2 (2021)	Synopsis (2024)

Music video
- "A10Tion" on YouTube

Best of Kis-My-Ft2 is the second best of album by Japanese boy band Kis-My-Ft2, released on August 10, 2021, from Avex Trax.

== Overview ==
This best album commemorates the 10th anniversary of their debut. The release of this album was announced during the MC of the final live performance of "Kis-My-Ft2 LIVE TOUR 2021 HOME" held on May 16, 2021. The release date was also set for August 10 to coincide with the debut date.

Common to all forms, the album includes all 34 title songs (including both A-sides and triple A-sides) from the 1st single "Everybody Go" to the 27th single "Luv Bias", as well as a new song "A10TION" to celebrate the 10th anniversary.

It was released in four forms: first-run disc A/B, regular disc, and Seven Net limited disc. The bonus CD for the first pressing A includes the top 15 songs voted by the public other than the title song of the single. The bonus DVD/Blu-ray includes 47 previously released music videos with supplementary audio talks by the members. The bonus CD for the first pressing B includes selected solo/unit songs as well as the song re-recorded for this album, which was voted No. 1 by the fans. The bonus DVD/Blu-ray includes the music video of the new song "A10TION", the making of the song, and the recording video of the solo angle. The regular edition includes the bonus track "Footsteps" and the bonus DVD/Blu-ray contains 28 songs selected by fan votes from past live videos.

The jacket photo of the first pressing A is designed to reproduce the jacket of the debut single "Everybody Go". In addition, the logo for this album combines the initial letters of the title logos from their 4th album "Kis-My-World" to their 9th album "To-y2" to form the letters "Kis-My-Ft2". This was the last best album by the seven members, as member Hiromitsu Kitayama left the Johnny's & Associates on August 31, 2023.

== Chart performance ==
In the Oricon Weekly Album Ranking dated August 23, 2021, Kis-My-1st album sold 247,000 copies in its first week and ranked No.1 for the first time. This was their 11th consecutive album to reach No.1 since their first album "Kis-My-1st". 11 consecutive No.1 albums from their first album ranks second all-time along with KAT-TUN.

== Package specifications ==
The album was released in four formats:

- First Edition A (3CD&2DVD) DVD(AVCD-96752/4/B/C) Blu-ray(AVCD96755/6,96757/B/C)
- First Edition B (3CD&DVD) DVD(AVCD-96758/9,76760/B) Blu-ray(AVCD96756/B/C)
- Regular Edition (2CD&DVD) DVD(AVCD-96754/5/B) Blu-ray(AVCD96766/7/B)
- Seven net Limited edition (AVC1-96768/9) -Analog record size jacket

== Track listing ==
=== CD ===
Normal Edition, First Press Edition A

- Disc 1
1. A10TION (read: Attention) [4:05]
2. Everybody Go [4:40]
3. We Never Give Up! :2nd single
4. She! Her! Her! [4:39]
5. Wanna Beee!!!! [4:09]
6. Shake It Up [4:18].
7. Ai no Beat -Dance ver.- [4:20]
8. My Resistance (Tashika na Mono) [4:55]
9. Unmei Girl [4:10].
10. Ki Su U Ma I (Kiss Your Mind) [4:12]
11. S.O.S (Smile On Smile) [4:10]
12. Kimi to no Kiseki [4:43]
13. Snow Dome no Yakusoku [5:01]
14. Luv Sick [3:38]
15. Hikari no Signal [4:25]
16. Another Future [3:56]
17. Thank You Jan! [4:44] (in Japanese)
- Disc 2
1. Kiss Damashii [4:03] : 13th single
2. AAO [4:14]: 14th single
3. Saigo mo Yappari Kimi [5:05] (Last one is you, after all): 15th single
4. Gravity [4:15] (Japanese only): 16th single
5. Sha la la Summer Time [3:52]: 17th single
6. Tonight [4:02]: The A-side song of the 18th single "Inter"
7. Kimi no iru sekai [5:16]: The A-side song of 18th single
8. Seven Wishes [4:28]: The A-side song of the 18th single
9. Pick It Up [3:34]
10. Akai Kajitsu [4:12]
11. Home* [4:26]
12. Love [3:39]
13. Kimi, Boku [5:02]
14. Kimi wo Daisuki da [4:37]
15. Hands Up [3:49]
16. Edge of Days [3:56]
17. Endless Summer* [4:20] (Japanese only)
18. Luv Bias* [3:07]
19. Ashioto(footsteps (sound)) [3:16] *Regular Edition Only

=== Bonus CD ===
First Edition A “Fan Voted BEST of 15 Tracks"

1. A.D.D.I.C.T. [3:43].
  Tracks from the 8th album Free Hugs!
2. Black & White [3:20]
  Songs from 2nd album “Good Ikuze! Songs from 2nd album Good Ikuze!
3. Eternal Mind [3:43]
  Songs included in DVD "Yoshio -new member-" Limited First Edition bonus CD
4. #1 Girl [3:34]
  Songs from the 8th album
5. Chudoku (addiction) [3:08]
  Bonus track for 8th album first pressing B
6. I Scream Night [4:09]
  Song from 5th album I Scream
7. Tell me why [3:35]
  Bonus track for 1st album Kis-My-1st (standard edition)
8. if [4:51]
  Song from 4th album Kis-My-World
9. Flamingo [3:25]
  Songs from the 5th album
10. Don't lose* [4:56]
  Coupling of 14th single regular edition
11. Tanagokoro** [3:56]
  8th single coupling
12. MU-CHU-DE I'm in love [4:33]
  16th single coupling
13. Shine as you feel it* [4:44].
  11th Single 3rd Anniversary Edition Coupling
14. Good-bye, Thank you [5:09].
  1st album limited first edition B bonus CD “Kis-My-Zero"
15. Re: [4:51] (included in the 5th album)
  Songs from 5th album

First Edition B “Selected Solo & Unit Songs + Fan Voted No.1 Re-recorded Songs

1. Don't Wanna Die [4:36] - Hiromitsu Kitayama
  Songs from the regular edition of the 8th album
2. Exit [3:06] - Kento Senga
  Lyrics by Hiroki Shirai, Composed by Masatomo Ota, Arranged by Yoshiyuki Kawabata
  Original song in 2006
3. It's Alright Even If You Were an Otaku! [4:24] - Toshiya Miyata
  Included in the limited 4cups edition of the 5th album
4. Watter Bento [3:12] - Wataru Yokoo
  Songs from the limited 4cups version of the 5th album
5. Maria [2:27] - Fujigaya Taisuke
  Words and music by Takashi Iioka, arrangement by Taku Yoshioka
  Original song from 2006.
6. Love Story [3:32] - Yuta Tamamori
  Included in the regular edition of 8th album
7. Hagusuta [2:58] - Nikaido Takatsugu
  Songs from the regular edition of the 8th album
8. Real Me [3:14] - Hiromitsu Kitayama, Taisuke Fujigaya
  7th album “Yummy! Included in 7th album Yummy!!
9. Happy Birthday* [1:35] - Hiromitsu Kitayama & Takashi Nikaido
  21st single standard version coupling
10. 2/7 billion* [3:31] - Takashi Nikaido, Kento Senga
  17th Single Limited First Edition B Coupling
11. ConneXion* [3:46] - Taisuke Fujigaya, Kento Senga, Wataru Yokoo
  21st Single Normal Edition Coupling
12. Touch* [4:03] - Taisuke Fujigaya, Yuta Tamamori
  17th Single Normal Edition Coupling
13. Wish Upon a Star* [4:52] - Yuta Tamamori & Toshiya Miyata
  21st Single Normal Edition Coupling
14. A Gift from Heaven [3:27] - Busaiku
  Busaiku 1st single
15. Good-bye, Thank you 2021 [5:14].
  Re-recorded version of the song from the 1st album limited edition B bonus CD

=== DVD/Blu-ray ===
First Edition A
Collection of music videos of previously released songs
Includes the members' side voice talk for all songs.
Disc 1

1. Everybody Go
2. We never give up!
3. SHE! HER! HER!
4. FIRE BEAT
5. Prayer
6. WANNA BEEEE!!!!
7. Shake It Up
8. Aino Beat -Dance ver.
9. My Resistance -Tashikanamono
10. Fate Girl
11. KISS YOUR MIND -Story ver.
12. S.O.S (Smile On Smile)
13. Kiseki with you
14. Tanagokoro
15. SNOW DOME no Yakusoku
16. Luv Sick
17. Hikari no Signal
18. Seven Journey
19. 3.6.5
20. Another Future
21. Perfect World
22. Thank you!

Disc 2

1. Kiss Soul
2. Brand New World
3. AAO
4. Even at the end, it's still you
5. Gravity
6. YES! I SCREAM
7. Sha la la la☆Summer Time
8. Tonight
9. Kimi no iru sekai
10. EXPLODE
11. PICK IT UP
12. Akai Kajitsu -Short Movie
13. L.O.V.E.
14. Because I Love You -Dance Edition
15. You, me.
16. I love you.
17. HUG & WALK
18. HANDS UP
19. Eien Knot -Lip ver.
20. Edge of Days
21. Mr. FRESH
22. To Yours
23. ENDLESS SUMMER
24. Positive Man
25. Luv Bias

First Edition B

1. A10TION Music Video
2. A10TION Music Video & Jacket Filming Making Documentary
3. Good-bye, Thank you 2021” Recording Movie (solo angle x 7)
  1. Hiromitsu Kitayama
  2. Kento Senga
  3. Toshiya Miyata
  4. Wataru Yokoo
  5. Taisuke Fujigaya
  6. Yuta Tamamori
  7. Takashi Nikaido

Regular Edition “Fans Voted Best of Live setlist"
This is the first Blu-ray version of the video.
All songs include the members' side voice talk.

1. Fire Beat
  Included 1st live video “Kis-My-Ft ni Aite de Show vol.3 at Yoyogi National Gymnasium 1st Gymnasium 2011.2.12
2. Hair
  Footage from the 1st live video
3. On-stage banter - their debut announcement in 2011
  Footage from the 1st live video
4. Everybody Go
  Footage from the 2nd live video “Kis-My-Ft2 Debut Tour 2011 Everybody Go at Yokohama Arena 2011.7.31
5. S.O.Kiss
  Footage from the 2nd live video
6. Girl is mine
  Footage from the 3rd live video “Kis-My-Ft2 Kis-My-MiNT Tour at Tokyo Dome 2012.4.8
7. Tell me why
  Video clip from the 3rd live video “Kis-My-Ft2 Kis-My-MiNT Tour at Tokyo Dome
8. Kis-My-Calling!
  4th live video “SNOW DOME no Yakusoku IN TOKYO DOME 2013.11.16” bonus DVD for limited first edition “Kis-My-Ft2 Good Live Tour Irukuse! at Yokohama Arena 2013.7.28
9. Forza!※ - Yuta Tamamori with Wataru Yokoo, Toshiya Miyata, Takatsugu Nikaido, Kennaga Senga
  4th live video from the bonus DVD of the limited first edition
10. Black & White
  4th Live Video
11. Snow Dome no Yakusoku
  Footage from the 4th live video
12. Daisukidesu
  Footage from the 5th live video “2014 Concert Tour ”Kis-My-Journey
13. FIRE!!! - Hiromitsu Kitayama, Taisuke Fujigaya
  Video footage from the 5th live video
14. if
  Footage from the 6th live video “2015 CONCERT TOUR ”KIS-MY-WORLD
15. Eternal Mind
  Footage from the 6th live video
16. Winter Lover
  Footage from 6th live video bonus DVD “New Year Kis-My-Fukubukuro -Thank you for your support this year! 〜Included in “New Year's Kiss My FUKUBUKURO -Thank you for all your support!
17. Good night
  6th live video special DVD
18. Re: (video included in the 7th live video “CONCERN”)
  Footage from the 7th live video “CONCERT TOUR 2016 I SCREAM
19. I Scream Night
  Footage from the 7th live video
20. VersuS
  Footage from the 8th live video “LIVE TOUR 2017 MUSIC COLOSSEUM
21. One Kiss
  Footage from the 8th live video
22. Break The Chains
  9th live video “LIVE TOUR 2018 Yummy! you&me
23. Mirage
  Footage from the 9th live video
24. Still song for you
  23rd single EXTRA edition bonus DVD “LIVE TOUR 2018 YOU&ME Extra Yummy! Included footage
25. Wish upon a star* - Yuta Tamamori, Toshiya Miyata
  Footage from the 23rd single EXTRA disc bonus DVD
26. A.D.D.I.C.T.
  Footage from the 10th live video “LIVE TOUR 2019 FREE HUGS!
27. Chudoku
  Footage from the 10th live video
28. Count 7even
  Footage from the 11th live video “Kis-My-Ft2 LIVE TOUR 2020 To-y2
29. Maharaja
30. Footage from the 11th live video
