= Kimi to no Kiseki =

Single by Kis-My-Ft2

from the album Hit! Hit! Hit! & Kis-My-World
- B-side: "Tanagokoro"; "Diamond Honey"
- Released: August 14, 2013 (Japan)
- Genre: J-pop
- Label: Avex Trax

Kis-My-Ft2 singles chronology
"Kiss U Mai (Kiss your mind)/Sos (Smile on smile) " (2013)	"Kimi to no Kiseki" (2013)	"Snow Dome no Yakusoku/Luv Sick" (2013)

Music video
- "Kimi to no Kiseki" on YouTube

"Kimi to no Kiseki" (Japanese: キミとのキセキ, Hepburn: Kimi to no kiseki) is the 8th single by Japanese boy band Kis-My-Ft2. Thisis the theme song for TBS TV television series Pin to Kona starring Yuta Tamamori It was released on August 14, 2013.

== Overview ==
"Kimi to no Kiseki" is the theme song of the drama Pintokona starring Yuta Tamamori. The song was written based on a request from the drama production staff to create a song with the theme of "the happiest time is when you are with your special someone" along with keywords such as "one-sided love," "pure love spanning 10 years," and "miraculous encounter.

The music video was produced under the concept of a summer festival. A total of 34 people appeared in the video, including 27 trainees from Johnny & Associates in addition to the members of Kis-My-Ft2, and enjoyed watching shooting stars and fireworks in the night sky in this refreshing summer video.

"Diamond Honey" included in the regular edition is a commercial song for DHC Corporation "Medicated Acne Control Series" fethering Kis-My-Ft2, and also the themesong of Fuji TV's "Moshi Mo Tours".

== Chart performance ==
It debuted in number one on the weekly Oricon Singles Chart and reached number one on the Billboard Japan Hot 100. It was the 19th best-selling single in Japan in 2013, with 309,762 copies.

== Track listing ==
=== CD ===
1. "Kimi to no Kiseki" (4:44)
2. "Tanagokoro" (3:59)
3. "Diamond Honey" (3:34) Regular edition only

=== DVD ===
- First Edition A
1. "Kimi to no Kiseki" MV
2. "Kimi to no Kiseki" MV Making Movie
- First Edition B
1. "Tanagokoro" MV
2. "Tanagokoro" MV Making Movie
