= Hit! Hit! Hit! =

Greatest hits album by Kis-My-Ft2
- Released: March 26, 2014
- Genre: J-pop
- Length: 67:00
- Label: Avex Trax

Kis-My-Ft2 chronology
Good Ikuze! (2013)	Hit! Hit! Hit! (2014)	Kis-My-Journey (2014)

Hit! Hit! Hit! (Japanese: ヒット!ヒット!ヒット!, Hepburn: Hitto hitto hitto) is the first best of album by Japanese boy band Kis-My-Ft2, released on March 26, 2014, by avex trax.

Includes all title songs from the 1st single "Everybody Go" to the 9th single "Snow Dome no Yakusoku/Luv Sick". Sold in three formats:

- First Limited Edition (CD & 2DVD)
- Regular Edition A (CD & DVD)
- Regular Edition B (CD only).

Regular Edition A comes in a digipak, and first limited Edition comes with a photo book. There are two DVDs on the first limited edition, the first containing the music videos for each song, which are also included in the regular edition A, and the second containing concert videos for each song.

To commemorate the release, the "Kis-My-Ft2 Photo Panel Exhibition" was held in four cities: Sapporo, Nagoya, Osaka, and Fukuoka. Also on display were LP-sized versions of jacket photos from the first single "Everybody Go" to the 10th single "Hikari no Signal," artist photos, photos from live performances, and photos only available at the panel exhibition.

== Chart Results ==
It sold approximately 218,000 copies in the first week of release, and topped the Oricon weekly album rankings on April 7, 2014. This is the third consecutive album to top the rankings since their first album, Kis-My-1st, and the first time in three years and seven months for a male/female group or solo artist to do so. It is also the first time in five years and ten months for a male artist to do so since KAT-TUN. In addition, sales reached approximately 244,000 copies, and the album ranked second in the Oricon monthly album rankings for March 2014.

== Package specifications ==
It was released in three formats:

- First Limited Edition (AVCD38924/B/C) CD & 2DVD & Photo Book
- Regular Edition A (AVCD38925/B) CD & DVD
- Regular Edition B (AVCD38926) CD

== Track listing ==
=== CD ===
- Regular Edition B
1. Everybody Go: TBS Television (Japan) Friday drama "Ikemen desu ne" theme song
2. We never give up!: "Lawson (store) HOT STATION Elpaca" CM song
3. SHE! HER! HER!: Glico gum "Watering KISSMINT" CM song
4. WANNA BEEEEEE!!!!: TBS Television (Japan) Thursday Drama 9 "Beginners! Theme song
5. Shake It Up: Nippon TV "Shiritsu Bakalea High School" opening theme song
6. Ai no Beat -Dance ver.
7. Ai no Beat -Rock ver.
8. My Resistance -Tashikanamono: TV Asahi Friday night drama "A Chef of Nobunaga" theme song
9. Unmei Girl: Seven & I Holdings "Valentine Fair" CM song
10. Ki Su U Mai -Kiss Your Mind-: Glico gum "Watering KISSMINT" CM song
11. S.O.S (Smile On Smile): DHC Corporation "Medicinal Acne Control Series" CM song
12. Kimi to no Kiseki: TBS Television (Japan) Thursday Drama 9 "Pin to Kona" theme song
13. Snow Dome no Yakusoku: Seven-Eleven Japan "Seven-Eleven Fair" CM song
14. Luv Sick: Nippon TV & The Movie "Kamen Teacher" theme song
15. Kis-My-Calling! :(2009 Original Song)
  - Included only on Regular edition B. This song was also the song that introduces the members of Kis-My-Ft2. The song had been performed frequently at live performances before their debut, but this was the first time it had been included on a CD.

=== DVD ===
==== DISC 1 ====
- First Edition and Regular Edition A only
  - Collection of Music Video of all single songs
1. Everybody Go
2. We never give up!
3. SHE! HER! HER!
4. WANNA BEEEEEE!!!!
5. Shake It Up
6. Ai no Beat -Dance ver.
7. Ai no Beat -Rock ver.
8. My Resistance -Tashikanamono
9. Unmei Girl
10. KISS U MA I -KISS YOUR MIND- [Story version]
11. S.O.S (Smile On Smile)
12. Kimi to no Kiseki
13. SNOW DOME no Yakusoku
14. Luv Sick

==== DISC 2 ====
- First Edition only
  - Live footage of all the single songs
1. Everybody Go
2. We never give up!
3. SHE! HER! HER!
4. WANNA BEEEE!!!!
5. Shake It Up
6. Ai no Beat -Dance ver.-
7. My Resistance -Tashikanamono
8. Unmei Girl
9. Ki-su-ma-i (KISS YOUR MIND)
10. S.O.S (Smile On Smile)
11. Kiseki with you
12. SNOW DOME no Yakusoku
13. Luv Sick

== Works included in "Kis-My-Calling" ==
- Single "Everybody Go" First Edition B
- Live DVD/Blu-ray "Kis-My-Ft ni Aeru de Show Vol. 3 at Kokuritsu Yoyogi Daiichi Taiikukan 2011.2.12"
- Live DVD/Blu-ray "Snow Dome no Yakusoku in Tokyo Dome 2013.11.16"
- "Hit! Hit! Hit!" Regular Edition B
- Live DVD/Blu-ray "2014 Concert Tour Kis-My-Journey"
- Album "Kis-My-World" First Edition A
- Live DVD/Blu-ray "2015 Concert Tour Kis-My-World"
- Album "I Scream (album)"
- Live Blu-ray "Concert Tour 2016 I Scream"
- Live DVD/Blu-ray "Live Tour 2018 Yummy! ! you&me"
- Best Album "Best of Kis-My-Ft2" Regular Edition
- Single "Two as One (song)" Fan Club Limited Edition (Kis-My-Ft ni aeru de Show 2022)
- Live DVD/Blu-ray "Kis-My-Ft ni aeru de Show 2022 in DOME"
