= List of best-selling singles in 2013 (Japan) =

\This is a list of the best-selling singles in 2013 in Japan, physical sales are taken from Oricon. Digital sales are taken from the certifications of RIAJ in 2013. A single usually has an A-side song and a B-side song, or more, digit sales count them up.

Ranking	Single	Artist	Physical	Digital	TOTAL	Peak
1	"Sayonara Crawl"	AKB48	1,955,162		1,955,162	1
2	"Koi Suru Fortune Cookie"	AKB48	1,479,036	350,000	1,829,036	1
3	"Heart Electric"	AKB48	1,260,792		1,260,792	1
4	"So Long!"	AKB48	1,132,853		1,132,853	1
5	"EXILE PRIDE ~Konna Sekai wo Aisuru Tame~"	Exile	1,012,407		1,012,407	1
6	"Calling/Breathless"	Arashi	881,192		881,192	1
7	"Choco no Dorei"	SKE48	671,623		671,623	1
8	"Utsukushii Inazuma"	SKE48	661,557		661,557	1
9	"Jiyū e no Shingeki"	Linked Horizon	230,810	350,000	580,810	2
10	"Bokura no Eureka"	NMB48	557,802		557,802	1
11	"Endless Game"	Arashi	557,217		557,217	1
12	"Ninja Re Bang Bang	Kyary Pamyu Pamyu	26,648+	500,000	526,648	3
13	"Sansei Kawaii!"	SKE48	496,124		496,124	1
14	"Kamonegikkusu"	NMB48	496,124		496,124	1
15	"Girls' Rule"	Nogizaka46	452,310		452,310	1
16	"Barrette"	Nogizaka46	423,417		423,417	1
15	"Joy!!"	SMAP	395,087		395,087	1
16	"My Resistance-Tashikana Mono-/Unmei Girl"	Kis-My-Ft2	377,055		377,055	1
17	"RPG"	Sekai no Owari	124,729	250,000	374,729	2
18	"Peace to Highlight"	Southern All Stars	339,575		339,575	1
19	"Hesomagari/Koko ni Shikanai Keshiki"	Kanjani Eight	334,632		334,632	1
20	"Kimi to no Kiseki"	Kis-My-Ft2	309,762		309,762	1
21	"SNOW DOME no Yakusoku / Luv Sick"	Kis-My-Ft2	306,433		306,433	1
22	"Seifuku no Mannequin"	Nogizaka46	306,430		306,430	1
23	"Kimi no Na wa Kibō"	Nogizaka46	306,202		306,202	1
24	"Melon Juice"	HKT48	295,967		295,967	1
25	"Suki! Suki! Skip!"	HKT48	291,876		291,876	1
26	"Burning Up"	Exile Tribe	287,874		287,874	1
27	"Namida no Kotae"	Kanjani Eight	286,657		286,657	1
28	"Preserved Roses"	T.M.Revolution x Nana Mizuki	175,828	100,000	275,828	2
29	"Ki.Su.U.Ma.I ~KISS YOUR MIND~/S.O.S. (Smile On Smile)"	Kis-My-Ft2	262,737		262,737	1
30	"Shiosai no Memory"	Kyōko Koizumi	161,554	100,000	261,554	2
31	"Hikōkigumo"	Yumi Matsutoya		250,000	250,000	
32	"Come On A My House"	Hey! Say! JUMP	242,314		242,314	1
33	"Mistake!/Battery"	SMAP	235,076		235,076	1
34	"Flower Song"	Exile	126,405	100,000	226,405	2
35	"Mystery Virgin"	Ryosuke Yamada	219,871		219,871	1
36	"Mada Namida ni Naranai Kanashimi ga/Koi ha Nihohe to Chirinuru wo"	KinKi Kids	202,409		202,409	1
37	"Kokoro Sora Moyō"	Kanjani Eight	192,573		192,573	1
38	"Dance My Generation"	Golden Bomber	177,565		177,565	1
39	"Expose"	KAT-TUN	173,400		173,400	1
40	"Real Sexy!/Bad Boys"	Sexy Zone	168,580		168,580	1
41	"Bai Bai Dubai ~See You Again~/A My Girl Friend"	Sexy Zone	167,946		167,946	1
42	"Ocean"	TVXQ	159,163		159,163	2
43	"Wagamama Ki no Mama Ai no Joke / Ai no Gundan"	Morning Musume	158,915		158,915	1
44	"Catch Me"	TVXQ	156,537		156,537	1
45	"Tanjōbi ni wa Mashiro na Yuri o/Get the Groove"	Masaharu Fukuyama	154,120		154,120	1
46	"Give Me Love"	2PM	152,781		152,781	2
47	"Face to Face"	KAT-TUN	150,310		150,310	1
48	"World Quest/Pokopon Pekōrya"	NEWS	148,348		148,348	1
49	"Scream"	TVXQ	145,628		145,628	2
50	"Eien Pressure"	AKB48	133,370		133,370	1
51	"SUMMER NUDE'13"	Tomohisa Yamashita	130,870		130,870	1
52	"Hirihiri no Hana"	Not Yet	127,855		127,855	1
53	"Shortcake"	Yuki Kashiwagi	127,530		127,530	2
54	"Hey What's Up?"	Jin Akanishi	126,793		126,793	
55	"Winter Games"	2PM	125,227		125,227	1
55	"Boys Meet U"	SHINee	124,729		124,729	2

== See also ==
- List of Oricon number-one singles of 2013
