= List of Hot 100 number-one singles of 2013 (Japan) =

This is a list of number one singles on the Billboard Japan Hot 100 chart in Japan in 2013. The week's most popular songs in Japan, ranked by the Hanshin Corporation and based on radio airplay measured by Plantech and sales data as compiled by SoundScan Japan.

== Chart history ==
Issue date is from Billboard-Japan.com. The date posted on the main Billboard.com site is usually five days later.

| Date | Song | Artist | Reference |
|---|---|---|---|
| January 14 | "Dance My Generation" | Golden Bomber | |
| January 21 | "Mystery Virgin" | Ryosuke Yamada | |
| January 28 | "Catch Me -If You Wanna-" | TVXQ | |
| February 4 | "Music" | Sakanaction | |
| February 11 | "Choco no Dorei" | SKE48 | |
| February 18 | "Expose" | KAT-TUN | |
| February 25 | "My Resistance-Tashikana Mono-/Unmei Girl" | Kis-My-Ft2 | |
| March 4 | "So Long!" | AKB48 | |
| March 11 | "Mistake!" | SMAP | |
| March 18 | "Calling / Breathless" | Arashi | |
| March 25 | "Que Sera Sera" (怪・セラ・セラ, Ke Sera Sera) | Tomohisa Yamashita | |
| April 1 | "Ninjya Re Bang Bang" | Kyary Pamyu Pamyu | |
| April 8 | "Ki Su U Ma I ~Kiss Your Mind~" | Kis-My-Ft2 | |
| April 15 | "Jane Doe" | Minami Takahashi | |
| April 22 | "Tanjōbi ni wa Mashiro na Yuri o" (誕生日には真白な百合を) | Masaharu Fukuyama | |
| April 29 | "Koisuru Kisetsu" (恋する季節) | Naoto Inti Raymi | |
| May 6 | "Hesomagari" | Kanjani Eight | |
| May 13 | "RPG" | Sekai no Owari | |
| May 20 | "Glad You Came" | The Wanted | |
| May 27 | "Preserved Roses" | T.M.Revolution×Nana Mizuki | |
| June 3 | "Sayonara Crawl" | AKB48 | |
| June 10 | "Endless Game" | Arashi | |
| June 17 | "Joy!!" | SMAP | |
| June 24 | "Namida no Kotae" | Kanjani Eight | |
| July 1 | "Bokura no Eureka" | NMB48 | |
| July 8 | "Come On A My House" | Hey! Say! JUMP | |
| July 15 | "Girls' Rule" | Nogizaka46 | |
| July 22 | "Feuerroter Pfeil und Bogen" | Linked Horizon | |
| July 29 | "Utsukushii Inazuma" | SKE48 | |
| August 5 | "Thank You Summer Love" | Kara | |
| August 12 | "Summer Nude '13" | Tomohisa Yamashita | |
| August 19 | "Peace to Highlight" | Southern All Stars | |
| August 26 | "Kimi Tono Kiseki" | Kis-My-Ft2 | |
| September 2 | "Koi Suru Fortune Cookie" | AKB48 | |
| September 9 | "Koi Suru Fortune Cookie" | AKB48 | |
| September 16 | "Melon Juice" | HKT48 | |
| September 23 | "Matataki" | Tsuyoshi Domoto | |
| September 30 | "Time Machine Nante Iranai" | Atsuko Maeda | |
| October 7 | "Hirihiri no Hana" | Not yet | |
| October 14 | "Kamonegikkusu" | NMB48 | |
| October 21 | "Bye Bye Du Bye -See You Again- | Sexy Zone | |
| October 28 | "Winter Games" | 2PM | |
| November 4 | "Mada Namida Ni Naranai Kanashimi Ga" (まだ涙にならない悲しみが) | KinKi Kids | |
| November 11 | "Heart Electric" | AKB48 | |
| November 18 | "Sayonara Arigato" (サヨナラ☆ありがとう) | Hotta Ke BAND | |
| November 25 | "SNOW DOME No Yakusoku (SNOW DOMEの約束)" | Kiss-My-Ft2 | |
| December 1 | "Sansei Kawaii!" | SKE48 | |
| December 9 | "Barrette" (バレッタ) | Nogizaka46 | |
| December 16 | Kokoro sora moyō (ココロ空モヨウ, "Kokoro Sora Moyō") | Kanjani Eight | |
| December 23 | "Suzukake no Ki no Michi de "Kimi no Hohoemi o Yume ni Miru" to Itte Shimattara Bokutachi no Kankei wa Dō Kawatte Shimau no ka, Bokunari ni Nannichi ka Kangaeta Ue de no Yaya Kihazukashii Ketsuron no Yō na Mono" (鈴懸の木の道で「君の微笑みを夢に見る」と言ってしまったら僕たちの関係はどう変わってしまうのか、僕なりに何日か考えた上でのやや気恥ずかしい結論のようなもの) | AKB48 | |
| December 30 | "Shareotsu" (シャレオツ) | SMAP | |
