= Pick It Up =

Pick It Up may refer to:

- "Pick It Up" (Cardi B song), 2025
- "Pick It Up" (Famous Dex song), 2017
- "Pick It Up" (Kis-My-Ft2 song), 2017
- "Pick It Up" (Redman song), 1997
- "Pick It Up", a song by Fergie from The Dutchess, 2006
- "Pick It Up", a song by Lil Mama from VYP (Voice of the Young People), 2008
- "Pick It Up", a song by Luke Bryan from What Makes You Country, 2017
- "Pick It Up", a song by Paul Weller from Saturns Pattern, 2015
- Pick It Up, an album by Planetshakers, 2006
- Pick It Up, an album by Relâche, 1997
