= Sha la la Summer Time =

Single by Kis-My-Ft2

from the album Music Colosseum and Best of Kis-My-Ft2
- B-side: "Snack Showwa"; "2 in 7 Billion"; "Dream Stage"; "Touch"
- Released: August 24, 2016
- Genre: J-pop
- Length: 3:53
- Label: Avex Trax
- Composer: Samuel Waermo，Stefan Ekstedt，Didrik Thott
- Lyricist: Komu

Kis-My-Ft2 singles chronology
"Gravity" (2016)	"Sha la la Summer Time" (2016)	"Inter" (2017)

Music video
- "Sha la la Summer Time" on YouTube "Sha la la Summer Time"(spinned off movie) on YouTube

"Sha la la Summer Time" (Sha la la☆Summer Time) is the 17th single of Japanese boy band Kis-My-Ft2, released on August 24, 2016.

== Overview ==
This is their 17th single and is a bright summer song, a commercial song for Kowa "Unakowa", and "Dream Stage" on the regular disc is the theme song for Fuji TV's "Moshi Mo Tours". Each of the three formats also includes duo or trio song as a coupling. The first edition A features songs by Hiromitsu Kitayama, Wataru Yokoo and Toshiya Miyata, the first edition B features Takashi Nikaido and Kento Senga, and the regular edition features Taisuke Fujigaya and Yuta Tamamori.

For the first time in the three and a half years since "Unmei Girl," the music video is fully devoted to roller-skating action. The setting is a 1980's drivers' cafe where the band members stop by to play at the beach, and the stage is set in the image of a "late summer night".

In addition to the usual roller skating performance music video included on the first disc A, this is the first time Kis-My-Ft2 has attempted a "spin-off music video" to bring the summer to a close with a video. The stage is set at the "Kis-My Summer" launch site. A mysterious creature appears. The Last Scream that roll up to the members enjoying the show are also part of the fun.

During breaks in the long shoot, the members used the bar counter on the set and began an impromptu improvisational play between the bar's mom and the customers.

== Chart performance ==
The song reached No. 1 on the Oricon Weekly Chart dated September 5, 2016. This is the 17th consecutive time since their debut single to reach No. 1 on the same chart. This single was trailed by "Yamato Dancing" by the Tokai region boy band Boys and Men by 70,000 copies in the first three days, but sold 90,000 copies in the following four days, topping the weekly total of 209,000 copies, and topping the overall Billboard Japan Hot 100 by a wide margin over No. 2 and below.

== Package specifications ==
It was released in three forms:

- First edition A CD & DVD (AVCD-83694/B)
- First edition B CD & DVD (AVCD-83695/B)
- Regular edition CD (AVCD-83696)

== Track listing ==
=== CD ===
- Regular edition
1. "Sha la la la Summer Time" (3:54)
  - Lylics: Komu
  - Composer: Samuel Waermo，Stefan Ekstedt，Didrik Thott
  - Arranger: Stefan Ekstedt
2. "Dream Stage" (4:02)
3. "Touch" (4:03) song by Taisuke Fujigaya and Yuta Tamamori
- First Edition A
1. "Sha la la la Summer Time"
2. "Snack Showwa" (4:25) song by Hiromitsu Kitayama, Wataru Yokoo and Toshiya Miyata
- First Edition B
1. "Sha la la la Summer Time"
2. "2 in 7 Billion" (3:31) song by Takashi Nikaido and Kento Senga

=== DVD ===
- First Edition A
1. "Sha la la la Summer Time" Music Video
2. "Sha la la la Summer Time" Making Document
- First Edition B
1. "Sha la la Spin-off (Last Scream)" Music Video
2. Spin-off MV Making Document
3. Kis-My-Ft2 Summer Special Making movie on location in Okinawa
