= You & Me (Kis-My-Ft2 single) =

Single by Kis-My-Ft2

from the album Best of Kis-My-Ft2
- A-side: "Home" (All members); "Zero" (Kitayama, Fujigaya and Tamamori)
- Released: April 25, 2018 (Japan)
- Genre: J-pop
- Label: Avex Trax

Kis-My-Ft2 singles chronology
"Akai Kajitsu" (2017)	"You & Me" (2018)	"Love" (2018)

"You & Me" is a special single by Japanese boy band Kis-My-Ft2, released on April 25, 2018, by Avex Trax as a Seven Net Shopping exclusive.

== Overview ==
Released on both A sides. "Home" was a commercial song for Tokyo Interior, and "Zero" was a small group song by Hiromitsu Kitayama, Taisuke Fujigaya, and Yuta Tamamori, the theme song for the late night drama The end of the XXX people on Nippon TV starring Wataru Yokoo, Toshiya Miyata, Takashi Nikaido, and Kento Senga.

According to the staff, the title of the single "You & Me" has a meaning. The song "Zero" means You (Tamamori, Fujigaya, Kitayama) and Me (Miyata, Yokoo, Senga, Nikaido) and the song "Home" means You (fans) and Me (Kis-My-Ft2). The single is said to express the idea that Kis-My-Ft2 can only shine brighter when everything is combined.

The 77,777 copy limited edition was released in two forms: a limited edition of 77,777 copies and a standard edition. 77,777-copy limited edition included a DVD with two video tracks, and the disc jacket was printed with the numbers from 001 to 77,777 and “(You) & Kis-My-Ft2 (Me)”. It was released at the same time as their 7th album Yummy!! and released at the same time.

== Track listing ==
=== CD ===
1. "Home" [4:29]
2. "Zero" [4:20] - Hiromitsu Kitayama, Taisuke Fujigaya, Yuta Tamamori

=== DVD ===
- Only for the limited edition of 77,777 copies
1. "Home" recording movie
2. "Zero" Dance Movie
