= Kokoro Sora Moyō =

Single by Kanjani Eight
- Released: December 4, 2013 (Japan)

Kanjani Eight singles chronology
"Namida no Kotae" (2013)	"Kokoro Sora Moyō" (2013)	"Hibiki" (2014)

"Kokoro Sora Moyō" (ココロ空モヨウ) is a single by Japanese boy band Kanjani Eight. It was released on December 4, 2013. It debuted in number one on the weekly Oricon Singles Chart and reached number one on the Billboard Japan Hot 100. It was the 33rd best-selling single in Japan in 2013, with 192,573 copies.
