= AAO (song) =

Single by Kis-My-Ft2

from the album I Scream and Best of Kis-My-Ft2
- B-side: "Novel"; "Let it Burn!"; "Do not lose"
- Released: October 14, 2015
- Genre: J-pop
- Length: 4:16
- Label: Avex Trax

Kis-My-Ft2 singles chronology
"Kiss Spirits" (2015)	"AAO" (2015)	"Saigo mo Yappari Kimi" (2015)

Music video
- "AAO" on YouTube

"AAO" (エイエイオー, ei-ei-oh) (Note: In Japanese, "ei-ei-oh" is a shout to inspire morale and announce the start of battle.) is the 14th single song of Kis-My-Ft2, released on October 14, 2015 by Avex Trax.

The song is the theme song of the drama Youth Detective Haruya. The song is reminiscent of the disco sounds of the 80s, with lyrics written by Naoto Inti Raymi and dance choreography by Papaya Suzuki.

The first pressing limited edition comes with a DVD containing the music video of the title song "AAO" and the making of the song.Kis-my-talk is not included in the rental. Hiromitsu Kitayama, Taisuke Fujigaya, Toshiya Miyata, and Yuta Tamamori are given solo parts.

== Chart performance ==
The song reached No. 1 on Oricon Weekly Singles Chart dated October 26, 2015. This is the 14th consecutive single to top the chart since their debut single "Everybody Go". First week sales: 181745 copies The single also earned the top spot on the overall Billboard Japan Hot 100 with points far ahead of second place and below.

== Package specifications ==
It was released in five forms:

- First edition A (AVCD-83235/B)
- First edition B (AVCD-83236/B)
- Regular edition (AVCD-83237)
- Kiss My SHOP limited edition (AVC1-83238)
- Seven & I limited edition (AVCD-83239/B)

The limited edition of Kiss My SHOP has 7 kinds of special gift for each member.

== Track listing ==
=== CD ===
- Only included in regular editions after "Let it Burn!"
1. "AAO" (4:16)
2. "Novel" (4:39)
3. "Let it Burn!"
4. "Do not lose" (5:03)
5. "Kis-my-talk" (bonus track)

=== DVD ===
- Limited First Edition
1. "AAO" Music video
2. Music video making document
- Kis-my-ft2 Shop Disc
1. "AAO" members choreography lecture
2. Kis-My-Gallery special video
3. Kowa (company) "Hokkairo nukkunuku toban" CM making-of
