= Good Ikuze! =

Good Ikuze! Goodいくぜ!

Studio album by Kis-My-Ft2
- Released: March 27, 2013
- Genre: J-pop
- Label: Avex Trax

Kis-My-Ft2 chronology
Kis-My-1st (2012)	Good Ikuze! Goodいくぜ! (2013)	Hit! Hit! Hit! (2013)

Singles from Good Ikuze!
- 1. "Wanna Beeee!!!/Shake It Up" Released: August 15, 2012; 2. "Ai no Beat" Released: November 14, 2012; 3. "My Resistance-Tashikana Mono-/Unmei Girl" Released: February 13, 2013

Good Ikuze! (Goodいくぜ！, Good Let's Go!) is the second album by Japanese boy band Kis-My-Ft2. It was released on March 27, 2013, in Japan under the record label Avex Trax.

== Overview ==
Approximately one year after their first album Kis-My-1st, Good Ikuze! was released with 2 limited editions: with the DVD Kis-My-History~Kakezan~! (Kis-My-History~かけざん~！, Kis-My-History~Multiplied~!) as well as with the special CD Kis-My-Zero 3.

On the weekly Oricon charts published April 8, 2013, the simultaneous release of their single "Ki Su U Ma I (Kiss Your Mind) / S.O.S. (Smile on Smile)", their DVD "Yoshio -New Member-", and their album Good Ikuze! granted them all the number one spot in their respective categories, with sales totalling over 2,140,000. The feat of taking top spots in DVD, single, and album sales at the same time had previously only been accomplished by Ayumi Hamasaki and KAT-TUN.

== Track listing ==
No.	Title	Writer(s)	Producer(s)	Length
1.	""2nd" Overture"	Jazzin' park	Jazzin' park
2.	"Black & White"	Sunny Boy; Steven Lee	Steven Lee
3.	"Wanna Beee!!!"	Komu; Chokkaku; her0ism	Chokkaku
4.	"Unmei Girl"	zopp; Chokkaku; E.ONE1&2	Chokkaku
5.	"Strawberry Dance"	Satoru Kurihara; Erik Lidbom; youwhich; Daichi	Tomoki Ishizuka
6.	"xLunaSx" (Taisuke Fujigaya)	T.Fxxx; Steven Lee; The Goldfingerz; Drew Ryan Scott	Masaya Suzuki
7.	"Forza!" (Yuta Tamamori with Wataru Yokoo/Toshiya Miyata/Takashi Nikaido/Kento Senga)	Hikari; Stephan Elfgren	Stephan Elfgren
8.	"Shake It Up"	Komei Kobayashi; Tommy Clint	Tommy Clint
9.	"Chance Chance Baybee" (Wataru Yokoo/Toshiya Miyata/Takashi Nikaido/Kento Senga)	Takuya Harada; Samuel Wearmo	Taku Yoshioka
10.	"Give Me..." (Hiromitsu Kitayama)	HusiQ.K; Fredrik Samsson; MiNE; Atsushi Shimada	her0ism
11.	"Ai no Beat" (album mix)	Jazzin' park	Jazzin' park
12.	"My Resistance: Tashikana Mono"	Jazzin' park	Jazzin' park
13.	"Mother Moon"	Kenichi Maeyamada	Masaya Suzuki

Standard edition bonus tracks
No.	Title	Writer(s)	Length
14.	"Jet! Set!! Go!!!"	Tatsuji Ueda; Takuya Harada; Dr.X; Lo-Fi
15.	"Catch Love"	zopp; Han Sang Won; Kazuaki Yamashita

Kis-My-Zero 3 (Limited Edition CD)
No.	Title	Writer(s)	Length
1.	"Try Again"	Youji Kubota; Takehiko Iida
2.	"Shooting Stars"	Kazuto Narumi; NAGAE
3.	"Kaizoku"	velvetronica
4.	"Think u x." (Taisuke Fujigaya)	T.Fxxx; Yuuki Shirai; Ryousuke Shigenaga
5.	"Brand New Season"	Junya Urushino; Yoshiyuki Obi
6.	"Rock U" (Hiromitsu Kitayama)	HusiQ.K; Yuuki Shirai; Yoshiyuki Obi
7.	"My Love"
8.	"Rocking Party" (Taisuke Fujigaya/Hiromitsu Kitayama/Yuta Tamamori)	HusiQ.K; T.Fxxx; Stephan Elfgren
9.	"Kis-My-Land"	Shingo Asari
15.	Untitled	821R; Koutarou Egami

Kis-My-History~Kakezan~ (Limited edition DVD)
No.	Title	Length
1.	"Hiromitsu Kitayama"
2.	"Kento Senga"
3.	"Toshiya Miyata"
4.	"Wataru Yokoo"
5.	"Taisuke Fujigaya"
6.	"Yuta Tamamori"
7.	"Takashi Nikaido"
8.	"Kakezan"
