= Exile Pride (Konna Sekai o Ai Suru Tame) =

"EXILE PRIDE ~Konna Sekai wo Aisuru Tame~"

Single by Exile

from the album 19 -Road to AMAZING WORLD-
- Released: April 3, 2013 (Japan)
- Genre: J-Pop
- Label: rhythm zone
- Songwriters: Atsushi Satō; Sean Phekoo

Exile singles chronology
"Bow & Arrows" (2012)	"EXILE PRIDE ~Konna Sekai wo Aisuru Tame~" (2013)	"Flower Song" (2013)

"Exile Pride (Konna Sekai o Ai Suru Tame)" (stylized as "EXILE PRIDE ~Konna Sekai wo Aisuru Tame~" (EXILE PRIDE 〜こんな世界を愛するため〜)) is the 41st single by the Japanese dance & vocal group EXILE. It was released on April 3, 2013, debuting in number one on the weekly Oricon Singles Chart. It was the 5th best-selling single in Japan in 2013, with 1,012,407 copies sold. The song was later found on EXILE's 10th studio album 19: Road to Amazing World in March 2015.

== Track List ==
1. EXILE PRIDE ~Konna Sekai wo Aisuru Tame~
2. EXILE PRIDE ~Konna Sekai wo Aisuru Tame~ (Instrumental)

Preceded by "Manatsu no Sounds Good!" (AKB48)	Japan Record Award Grand Prix; 2013	Succeeded by "R.Y.U.S.E.I." (Sandaime J Soul Brothers)
