= Free Hugs! =

Studio album by Kis-My-Ft2
- Released: April 24, 2019
- Genre: J-pop
- Length: 68:26(Regular Edition)
- Label: Avex Trax

Kis-My-Ft2 chronology
Yummy!! (2018)	Free Hugs! (2019)	To-y2 (2020)

Singles from Free Hugs!
- 1. "Love" Released: July 11, 2018; 2. "Kimi, Boku" Released: October 3, 2018; 3. "Kimi wo Daisuki da" Released: February 6, 2019

Music video
- "Hug & Walk" on YouTube "Lura Lurara" (Hug Movie) on YouTube

Free Hugs! (フリーハグス) is the eighth original album by Japanese boy band Kis-My-Ft2, released on April 24, 2019, by Avex Trax.

== Overview ==
The DVD of First edition A contains the music video for "Hug & Walk" and a making-of documentary. The music video for "Hug & Walk," the album's signature song, was shot in Singapore. This is the first time they have shot a music video overseas. The film was shot on location with a grand total of over 100 local dancers and extras. The members of Kis-my-Ft2, who had ventured out from Japan to the world, performed the "Free Hugs!" action while walking in various locations. At first things don't go well, but gradually they begin to close the distance between them, and in the end, the friends who have come together across borders dance the "Hug Dance" with music under the sky and connect with each other.

The message of the piece is: "Let's share love beyond genres and borders by hugging through music, and let's walk together toward the next stage. This is the message of the work.

The regular disc includes solo songs by all members for the first time in three years since I Scream. The solo songs are "hugs with music," with each member contributing music, as well as other artists.

The DVD of First edition B contains "KIS-MY-TV Special!" which is a new type of variety challenge that could be called the No. 1 operation in the history of Kis-my benefits.

With this album, a dome tour "Kis-My-Ft2 LIVE TOUR 2019 FREE HUGS!" was held from May 6 to July 14, 2019.

== Chart performance ==
Kis-My-1st recorded first-week sales of 205,000 copies, reaching No. 1 on the Oricon Weekly Albums Chart dated May 6, 2019. This is the ninth consecutive album since their first album "Kis-My-1st" to reach the top position on the same chart. It also broke the record for the most consecutive first-week sales of over 200,000 copies since the first album. This is the second-highest record in history after KinKi Kids. By December 8, 2019, it had sold a total of 235,335 copies and ranked 12th on the annual Oricon Album Ranking for 2019.

== Product specifications ==
The album was released in three formats:

- First Edition A (CD&DVD) - (AVCD-96288B)
- First Edition B (CD&DVD) - (AVCD-96289B)
- Regular Edition (CD) - (AVCD-96290)

The Regular Edition includes the solo songs by members Hiromitsu Kitayama, Taisuke Fujigaya, and Yuta Tamamori, and a bonus track introducing the members, "We are Kismai!" as a bonus track. The DVD included with the first pressing A and B will feature the songs from the album along with drama, comedy, variety, anime, documentary, and dance projects. The first disc A will include "KIS-MY-TV" and the first disc B will include "Kismay Sports Championship". In addition, the first pressing B includes seven jacket cards with visuals of the members.

== Track listing ==
=== CD ===
- Regular Edition, First Press Edition A

No.	Title	Length
1.	"8th Overture (inst.)"	0:59
2.	"Hug & Walk"	4:01
3.	"A.D.D.I.C.T."	3:45
4.	"This crazy love"	3:46
5.	"L.O.V.E."	3:40
6.	"Saturday Life"	3:52
7.	"#1 Girl (read: number one girl)"	3:37
8.	"I love you"	4:39
9.	"Kimi Nashi De Ai Ha Shirenai"	4:26
10.	"Bring It On"	3:29
11.	"Hugtime"	3:34
12.	"Yeah E Yeah!!!!!!!"	3:18
13.	"Kimi, Boku."	5:04
14.	"Lulalulala"	4:50

=== Bonus CD ===
- Regular disc only

No.	Title	Length
1.	"Love=X2U (read: Love crosses to you) by Taisuke Fujigaya"	4:03
2.	"Let's play catch by Wataru Yokoo"	4:59
3.	"Boku Dake no Princess by Toshiya Miyata"	4:30
4.	"I miss your smile by Kento Senga"	4:53
5.	"Don't wanna die by Hiromitsu Kitayama"	4:35
6.	"Hugsuta by Takashi Nikaido"	3:00
7.	"Love Story by Yuta Tamamori"	3:30

=== DVD ===
- First Edition A
1. Hug & Walk -Music video-
2. Hug & Walk -Lip ver.-
3. Episode of Free hugs! -Overseas shooting
- First Press Edition B
1. KIS-MY-TV Special! -Kiss Hug Operation
