= Kimi wo Daisuki da =

Single by Kis-My-Ft2

from the album Free Hugs!
- B-side: "Liar World"(First Edition); "Hurray! Hurray!"(Regular edition); "To the adventurer"(Regular edition); "Thinking of you"(Regular edition)
- Released: February 6, 2019
- Genre: J-pop
- Length: 4:39
- Label: Avex Trax
- Composer: Takumi Yoshida
- Lyricist: Fumiya Fujii

Kis-My-Ft2 singles chronology
"Kimi, Boku" (2018)	"Kimi wo Daisuki da" (2019)	"Hands Up" (2019)

Music video
- "Kimi wo Daisuki da" on YouTube

"Kimi wo Daisuki da" (君を大好きだ; lit. 'I Love You') is Kis-My-Ft2's 23rd single, released on February 6, 2019, by Avex Trax.

== Overview ==
The title song is the theme song for the movie Tora-san: The Reason I Became a Cat starring member Hiromitsu Kitayama. The music video included in the First edition is over 11 minutes long and is a drama, and includes a scene in which the members wear school uniforms and play in a band.

All songs on the regular edition are tie-up songs. "To the adventurer" is a commercial song for Lemino (dTV)'s "Kiss My Doki Doki!" and "Thinking of you" is a commercial song for Tokyo interior furniture", and "Hurray!" is a commercial song for Benesse's "Shinkenzemi junior high school preparation course".

The Extra disc DVD includes a Live DVD of Kis-My-Ft2 Live Tour 2018 You & Me Extra Yummy! that took place from December 8 to 16, 2018. This DVD includes December 9th concert held on Kyocera Dome Osaka.

"Still song for you" and "Wish upon a star" included in this Extra disc will later be included in "Best of Live Setlist", a bonus video for the regular edition of the 2nd best album "Best of Kis-My-Ft2".

== Package specifications ==
- First edition (AVCD-94356/B): CD, DVD
- Extra disc (AVCD-94357/B): CD, DVD
- Regular Edition (AVCD-94358): CD

== Chart performance ==
The album sold 297,000 copies in the first week, reaching No. 1 on the Oricon Weekly Singles Chart dated February 18. This was their 23rd consecutive No. 1 ranking on the chart since their debut single "Everybody Go." By December 8, 2019, it had sold a total of 318,738 copies and ranked 18th on the annual Oricon Album Ranking for 2019. The single topped the Billboard Japan Hot 100 on February 13, 2019.

== Track listing ==
=== CD ===
==== Regural edition and Extra edition ====
("Hurray! Hurray!" and later songs are included only on the regular edition.)

1. "Kimi wo Daisuki da" [4:39]
  - Lyrics by Fumiya Fujii, Composed by Takumi Yoshida, Arranged by Seiji Kameda Theme song for the Shawgate movie "Tora-san: Why I Became a Cat" starring Hiromitsu Kitayama.
2. "Hurray! Hurray!" [3:25]
  - Lyrics by KOMU, music composed and arranged by Octobar :Benesse "Shinkenzemi Junior High School Preparation Course" CM song.
3. "To the Adventurer" [3:55]
  - Lyrics by Kelly, Composed by Andreas Ohrn, Henrik Smith, Susumu Kawaguchi, Arranged by Andreas Ohrn, Henrik Smith dTV "Kiss My Doki Doki!" CM song
4. "Thinking of you" [4:47]
  - Lyrics, music, arrangement by Berry Goodman, Tokyo Interior Furniture" CM song. This is the third installment of the "Kimi Series" trilogy, following "Kimi wo Daisuki da", "Kimi, Boku".

==== First edition ====
1. "Kimi wo Daisuki da"
2. "Liar World" [4:19]
  - Lyrics by Iwatsubo Kodai, music by Albi Albertsson, Jonas Mengler, Iwatsubo Kodai, arrangement by Jonas Mengler and Hiroshi Usami

=== DVD ===
==== First Edition ====
1. "Kimi wo Daisuki da" Music Video
2. "Kimi wo Daisuki da" Music Video making document
3. "New project "Kis-My-Ft2 What If Series - Part 1"

==== Extra disc "Kis-My-Ft2 Live Tour 2018 You & Me Extra Yummy!" ====
1. Overture
2. Home
3. Still song for you
4. Super Tasty!
5. Pick it up
6. I Scream Night
7. AAO
8. We are Kis-My-Ft2!
9. Invitation
10. Break The Chains
11. Freeze
12. mirage
13. Because I Love You
14. She! Her! Her!
15. Thank you!
16. Happy Birthday
17. Sorairo
18. Holy night with you
19. The Town Where You Are
20. Snow dome's Promise
21. ConneXion
22. Wish Upon a Star
23. 2 parts per 7 billion
24. Real me
25. I goofed!!
26. Red fruits
27. Let it BURN!
28. Kiss Spirits
29. Tonight
30. Now, my endless dreams are still far away
31. You, me.
32. End Credits
33. Light Signal [Encore]
34. Youth Don't Stop!! [Encore]
35. Everybody Go [Encore]
