= Namida no Kotae =

Single by Kanjani Eight
- Released: June 12, 2013 (Japan)

Kanjani Eight singles chronology
"Hesomagari/Koko Ni Shikanai Keshiki" (2012)	"Namida no Kotae" (2013)	"Kokoro Sora Moyou" (2013)

"Namida no Kotae" (涙の答え) is a single by Japanese boy band Kanjani Eight. It was released on June 12, 2013. It debuted in number one on the weekly Oricon Singles Chart and reached number one on the Billboard Japan Hot 100. It was the 26th best-selling single in Japan in 2013, with 286,657 copies.
