= Kiss Damashii =

Single by Kis-My-Ft2

from the album Kis-My-World and I Scream
- B-side: "Shake Body!!"; "Sakura hirari"; "Past & future"
- Released: March 25, 2015
- Genre: J-pop
- Length: 4:05
- Label: Avex Trax

Kis-My-Ft2 singles chronology
"Thank You!" (2014)	"Kiss Damashii" (2015)	"AAO" (2015)

Music video
- Kiss Damashii on YouTube

"Kiss Damashii" (Japanese: Kiss魂, Hepburn: kissu Damashii) is the 13th single song by Japanese boy band Kis-My-Ft2, released on March 25, 2015, by Avex Trax.

== Overview ==
This title song is a commercial song for "Watering Kiss Mint" chewing gum by Glico. "Shakebody" on the B-side is a commercial song for Kowa's "Mushiyoke Toban," an insect repellent that repels mosquitoes and ticks.

The choreography for "Kiss Damashii"'s music video is all about rock and dance, and the dance challenge is the most difficult in the history of Kis-My-Ft2's music videos. The choreography was done by Shit Kingz, a dance team that has won the "Body Rock Competition" held in California, US, two years in a row. Our legs got all scratchy" commented member Yuta Tamamori.

The choreography is the most difficult in all of Kis-My-Ft2's works, so the members and staff kept filming the dance scenes until they were satisfied with the choreography, and danced over 40 times. During the filming, Tamamori said, "We just had to get through it with "Kis-My-Ft2 damashii" (the spirit of Kis-My-Ft2)," and the dance scenes were completed to a high degree of perfection and spectacular quality. The "Penguin Dance," named by the members, is the symbolic choreography of this music video. The name "Penguin Dance" was derived from the movement of the members' bodies swaying with their hands in the shape of penguins.

The multi-angle music video, in which you can enjoy the dance scenes separately for each member, is included in this single.

== Chart performance ==
The single debuted at No. 1 on the Oricon Weekly Singles Chart on April 6, 2015. This is the 13th consecutive No. 1 single since their debut song "Everybody Go." First week sales: 356218 copies The single also topped the overall Billboard Japan Hot 100.

== Package specifications ==
It was released in five forms:

- First edition A (AVCD-83235/B)
- First edition B (AVCD-83236/B)
- Regular edition (AVCD-83237)
- Kis-My-Ft2 Shop limited edition (AVC1-83238)
- Seven & i limited edition (AVCD-83239/B)

The limited edition of Kis-My-Ft2 Shop has seven kinds of special gift for each member.

== Track listing ==
=== CD ===
- First edition A/B and Regular edition
  - Included only on the regular edition after "Sakura Hirari."
1. "Kiss Damashii" (4:05)
2. "Shake Body!" (3:22)
3. "Sakura Hirari" (4:31) (Regular edition only)
4. "Past & Future" (4:03) (Regular edition only)
- Seven & i version, Kiss My Shop version
1. "Kiss Damashii"
2. "Shake Body!"
3. "Sakura Hirari"
4. "Kiss Damashii" (Remix)

=== DVD ===
- Limited First Edition A
1. "Kiss Damashii" Music video
2. Members' choreography lecture
3. Reflection of Soul
- Limited First Edition B
1. "Kiss Damashii" Multi-Angle Music video
2. "Kiss Damashii" Music video & making document of jacket shooting
3. Recording Closely Observed Footage
- Seven & i disc
  - Close contact document of Kis-My-Ft2 at the end and beginning of 2014–2015
