= List of Oricon number-one singles of 2013 =

The highest-selling singles in Japan are ranked in the Oricon Weekly Chart, which is published by Oricon Style magazine. The data are compiled by Oricon based on each singles' weekly physical sales.

== Chart history ==
Issue Date	Singles	Artist(s)	Reference(s)
January 7	"Rock Your Soul"	V6	
January 14	"Dance My Generation"	Golden Bomber	
January 21	"Mystery Virgin"	Ryosuke Yamada	
January 28	"Catch Me"	TVXQ	
February 4	"Help Me!!"	Morning Musume	
February 11	"Choco no Dorei"	SKE48	
February 18	"Expose"	KAT-TUN	
February 25	"My Resistance (Tashika na Mono)/Unmei Girl"	Kis-My-Ft2	
March 4	"So Long!"	AKB48	
March 11	"Mistake!/Battery"	SMAP	
March 18	"Calling/Breathless"	Arashi	
March 25	"Kimi no Na wa Kibō"	Nogizaka46	
April 1	"Suki! Suki! Skip!"	HKT48	
April 8	"Ki.Su.U.Ma.I (Kiss Your Mind)/S.O.S. (Smile on Smile)"	Kis-My-Ft2	
April 15	"Exile Pride (Konna Sekai o Ai Suru Tame)"	Exile	
April 22	"Tanjōbi ni wa Mashiro na Yuri o/Get the Groove" (誕生日には真白な百合を/Get the groove)	Masaharu Fukuyama	
April 29	"Brainstorming/Kimi Sae Ireba Nani mo Iranai"	Morning Musume	
May 6	"Hesomagari/Koko ni Shikanai Keshiki"	Kanjani Eight	
May 13	"Real Sexy!/Bad Boys"	Sexy Zone	
May 20	"Sister's Noise"	fripSide	
May 27	"Face to Face"	KAT-TUN	
June 3	"Sayonara Crawl"	AKB48	
June 10	"Endless Game"	Arashi	
June 17	"Joy!!"	SMAP	
June 24	"Namida no Kotae"	Kanjani Eight	
July 1	"Bokura no Eureka"	NMB48	
July 8	"Come On A My House"	Hey! Say! JUMP	
July 15	"Girl's Rule"	Nogizaka46	
July 22	"Burning Up"	Exile Tribe	
July 29	"Utsukushii Inazuma"	SKE48	
August 5	"Utsukushii Inazuma"	SKE48	
August 12	"Summer Nude '13"	Tomohisa Yamashita	
August 19	"Peace to Highlight" (ピースとハイライト)	Southern All Stars	
August 26	"Kimi to no Kiseki"	Kis-My-Ft2	
September 2	"Koi Suru Fortune Cookie"	AKB48	
September 9	"Wagamama Ki no Mama Ai no Joke/Ai no Gundan"	Morning Musume	
September 16	"Melon Juice"	HKT48	
September 23	"Mabataki" (瞬き)	Tsuyoshi Domoto	
September 30	"Exile Pride (Konna Sekai o Ai Suru Tame)"	Exile	
October 7	"Hirihiri no Hana"	Not Yet	
October 14	"Kamonegikkusu"	NMB48	
October 21	"Bye Bye Dubai (See You Again)/A My Girl Friend"" (バィバィDuバィ～See You Again～/A My Girl Friend)	Sexy Zone	
October 28	"Winter Games"	2PM	
November 4	"Mada Namida ni Naranai Kanashimi ga / Koi wa Nioeto"	KinKi Kids	
November 11	"Heart Electric"	AKB48	
November 18	"Sayonara☆Arigato"	Hotta-ka Band	
November 25	"Snow Dome no Yakusoku/Luv Sick"	Kis-My-Ft2	
December 2	"Sansei Kawaii!"	SKE48	
December 9	"Barrette"	Nogizaka46	
December 16	"Kokoro Sora Moyō"	Kanjani Eight	
December 23	"Suzukake Nanchara"	AKB48	
December 30	"Shareotsu/Hello"	SMAP	

== See also ==
- List of best-selling singles in 2013 (Japan)

== See also ==
- 2013 in music
