= Music Colosseum =

Studio album by Kis-My-Ft2
- Released: May 3, 2017
- Genre: J-pop
- Length: 70:38(Regular Edition); 57:10(First Edition)
- Label: Avex Trax

Kis-My-Ft2 chronology
I Scream (Kis-My-Ft2 album) (2016)	Music Colosseum (2017)	Yummy!! (2018)

Singles from Music Colloseum
- 1. "Sha la la Summer Time" Released: August 24, 2016; 2. "Tonight" Released: March 1, 2017

Music video
- "Explode" on YouTube; Digest of "Bokura no Music Colloseum" on YouTube

Music Colosseum (Music Colosseum (ミュージックコロシアム)) is the sixth original album by Japanese boy band Kis-My-Ft2, released on May 3, 2017, by Avex Trax.

== Overview ==
The title of the album, "Music Colosseum," is a reference to the seven brave souls who are taking on a new form of "music." It was announced that this album would be their "aggressive" work.

The lead song of the album is "Explode" and its music video is based on the theme of "Wild & Strong" and symbolizes Kis-My-Ft2 aggressively taking on the battle. This music video and the making-of documentary were included in the first edition A.

The special movie included in the first edition B was produced by Takashi Nikaido, a member of the group, and took about three months from conception to production under the mottos of "thinking seriously about seemingly trivial things and doing them seriously" and "playing with music to the hilt."

The story is about Tamachi, a brave man played by Yuta Tamamori, who sets out on a journey to find his friends after receiving a message from God. Tamacchi heads for "Music Mountain," a sacred place where brave men fight, and meets six unique "music fighters."

Shibumitsu (Hiromitsu Kitayama), a gyaru guy (a frivolous guy who used to live in Shibuya), Ken-King (Kent Senga), a genderless-fashioned guy who loves playing the piano, Miyacchi, an otaku who loves anime (Toshiya Miyata), Watter, a good cook (Wataru Yokoo), Taipi, a sexy cool guy (Taisuke Fujigaya) and Kis-My-Ft2's big fan Jossy Matsumura (Takashi Nikaido). After witnessing their respective confrontations, would Tamachi be able to make these brave men into friends?

In this special movie, the heroes battle one-on-one in a music battle, and at the end, they all dance to the song "Let's Go!" which is also the theme song of the movie The Lego Batman Movie.

== Commercial performance ==
It was the seventh album in a row to reach No. 1 on the Oricon Weekly Albums Chart dated May 15, 2017, selling 206,000 copies in its first week, and the third group in history to sell more than 200,000 copies in its first week since its first album. In addition, it became No. 1 on the May 15 Billboard Japan Hot Albums with 185,000 copies sold in the first week.

== Package specifications ==
It released in three forms:

- First Edition A (CD, DVD) (AVCD-93691B)
- First Edition B (CD, DVD) (AVCD-93692B)
- Regular Edition (CD) (AVCD-93693)

The first limited edition A includes the music video of the lead song "Explode". This song consists of two parts with the MV of "Tonight" from the previous single "Inter", and the choreography incorporates haka dance . The limited first edition B includes "Bokura no Music Colosseum," a video that explores the possibilities of "enjoying sound = music" and depicts the adventures of Tamachi, played by Yuta Tamamori, as well as the members' performances. The standard edition includes four bonus tracks, including solo songs by Kitayama, Fujigaya, and Tamamori.

== Track listing ==
=== CD ===
- Regular Edition
1. "Overture -Music Colosseum-" 02:37
2. "Explode" 05:08
3. "VersuS" 03:58
4. "Iine!" 04:10
5. "Let's Go!!" 03:42
6. "Seven Wishes" 04:29
7. "Yasashii Ame" 04:57
8. "One Kiss" 03:26
9. "Sha la la Summer Time" 03:52
10. "Camellia" 04:40
11. "Baby Love" 04:18
12. "Kiss Sichauzo" 03:25
13. "Life is Beautiful -Taisetsu na Anata he-" 03:51
14. "Kimi no iru Sekai" 05:18
15. "Bang! Bang! BURN!" 03:33
16. "r.a.c.e." 04:15
17. "Tonight" 04:05
18. "Dream on" 05:12

=== DVD ===
- First Edition A
1. "Explode" (Music Video)
2. "Explode" (Making Document)
3. KIS-MY-TV: Kiss My Colosseum
- Limited First Edition B
1. Suite "Bokura no Music Colosseum" (Special movie)
  1. Overture -Music Colosseum- (Instrumental)
  2. Ore no Aji VS Pure Love - Wataru Yokoo VS Kento Senga
    1. Ore no Aji by Wataru Yokoo
    2. Pure Love by Kento Senga
  3. Otaku Dattatte It's Alright! VS Sexy Peach
    1. Otaku Dattatte It's Alright! by Toshiya Miyata
    2. Sexy Peach by Taisuke Fujigaya
  4. Jossy Matsumura's Scream VS Charakku Night?
    1. Jossy Matsumura's Scream by Takashi Nikaido
    2. Charakku Night? by Hiromitsu Kitayama
  5. Touch by Taisuke Fujigaya, Yuta Tamamori
  6. "Let's Go!!" by Kis-My-Ft2
2. Suite "Bokura no Music Colosseum" (Special Movie Document)
