= Akai Kajitsu =

Single by Kis-My-Ft2

from the album Yummy!!
- B-side: "Hot! Hot!"; "Future Train"; "Now, my endless dreams are still far away"
- Released: November 29, 2017
- Genre: J-pop
- Length: 4:14
- Label: Avex Trax

Kis-My-Ft2 singles chronology
"Pick It Up" (2017)	"Akai Kajitsu" (2017)	"You & Me" (2018)

Music video
- "Akai Kajitsu" (Short movie) on YouTube "Akai Kajitsu" (Dance edition) on YouTube

"Akai Kajitsu" (赤い果実; lit. 'Red Fruits') is Japanese boy band Kis-My-Ft2's 20th single, released on CD on November 29, 2017 by Avex Trax.

== Overview ==
This title song was written as the theme song for the television series Key Person of Interest Detective starring Yuta Tamamori, and the title means "truthful truth, true heart."

The music video (MV) for the song was shot on location in a medieval European-like town in Wakayama Prefecture, the first time in three and a half years since "3.6.5".

The "Short Movie" is a story version and the "Dance Edition" is a dance version of the same song with the same arrangement. Short movie depicts the story of the "revolution" of seven people trapped in a world where music is forbidden, until they are freed, while in "Dance Edition" the seven people are handcuffed and dance the "chain dance". The use of chains was inspired by the aforementioned drama starring Tamamori and proposed by member Kento Senga.

The song depicts "seven people deprived of their freedom and bound together" and "the way seven people are connected by a bond". The members also wear chains in the jacket photo and when they perform the song on TV.

== Release ==
On November 29, 2017, the CD was sold in three types: limited first-run edition A/B and regular edition. The DVD included in the first edition A contains two music videos for "Akai Kajitsu," while the first edition B contains footage of the members playing the loose sport of hand soap ball and a preview of their upcoming video work "Live Tour 2017 Music Colosseum" to be released the following year.

The coupling song "Future Train" included in the regular disc is a "GO! Kiss My Kumamoto Ōita" commercial song of Kyushu Railway Company.

"Hot! Hot!" is included as a coupling song for all forms of the album, was used as the commercial song for Kowa's new hand warmer "Nukunuku Toban", and the English lyrics are sung to sound like the Japanese "Quickly Hot Hot".

== Chart performance ==
According to the Billboard Japan Top Singles Sales, the single was No. 1 with sales of 187,000 copies in the first week, the single also topped the Billboard Japan Hot 100. It was also No. 1 in the Oricon Singles Weekly Ranking dated December 11, marking their 20th consecutive No. 1 album and tying for fourth place in the history of consecutive No. 1 singles since their debut. This was their 20th consecutive No. 1 album, and tied for the fourth-highest number of consecutive No. 1 singles since their debut. In the same monthly ranking, it was No. 4 in November 2017 and No. 32 in the annual ranking. The number of copies sold in the first week was 184,661.

== Reception ==
Azusa Ogiwara, the writer of Real sound which move from a dark world of "darkness" and "fall" to the hope of "salvation," are effectively expressed by heavy rock-style guitars, low-pitched strings, and short single-note pianos. She also commented that the phrase "Akai Kajitsu" that appears at the beginning of the song and after the first chorus accentuates the song and gives it a powerful impression, making it more than just a "dark" song. She also commented that She felt a musical quality in the part after the second chorus, which has no lyrics, and that he felt the group's new appeal in that it portrays "them as characters in a story rather than their life-size, realistic selves.

== Track listing ==
It was released in three formats: First edition A, First edition B and Regular edition. First edition A and First edition B include DVDs. Regular edition includes four songs.

=== CD ===
- Only included in regular editions after "Future Train."
1. "Akai Kajitsu" (4:14)
2. "Hot! Hot!" (4:24)
3. "Future Train" (3:55), (regular edition only)
4. "Now still far away, an endless dream" (4:04), (regular edition only)

=== DVD ===
- First Edition A
1. "Akai Kajitsu" Music Video (Short Movie)
2. "Akai Kajitsu" Music Video (Dance Edition)
3. "Akai Kajitsu" Music Video Making Documentary
- First Edition B
1. New project! Kis-My-Ft2 Funny Sports Championship Part 1
2. After party of live concert (Snack Showwa Trailer)
