= Gravity (Kis-My-Ft2 song) =

Single by Kis-My-Ft2

from the album I Scream
- B-side: "Mu-chu-de Koishiteru"; "Crystal Sky"; "Welcome"
- Released: March 16, 2016
- Genre: J-pop
- Label: Avex Trax

Kis-My-Ft2 singles chronology
"Saigo mo Yappari Kimi" (2015)	"Gravity" (2016)	"Sha la la Summer Time" (2016)

Music video
- "Gravity" on YouTube

"Gravity" is the 16th single of Japanese boy band Kis-My-Ft2, released on March 16, 2016 by Avex Trax.

== Overview ==
The title song is also the theme song for the Japanese television series Mars (I Just Love You) starring Taisuke Fujigaya and Masataka Kubota. It is a fast and powerful dance song. This series is the first dramatization of the popular 1990s manga Mars by Fuyumi Soryo, which has sold more than 5 million copies.

The song was choreographed by the Shit Kingz, and the costumes and accessories worn in the music video were designed by Kento Senga, a member of the group.

The coupling song "Mu-chu-de Koishiteru" is a commercial song for "Ginza Color" in which Fujigaya appears.

== Chart performance ==
The song reached No. 1 on the weekly Oricon chart dated October 26, 2015. This is the 14th consecutive single to top the chart since their debut single "Everybody Go". First week sales: 181745 copies The single sold 210,000 copies in its first week and topped the overall Billboard Japan Hot 100.

== Package specifications ==
This album was released in four formats: First edition A, First edition B, Regular edition, and Kis-My-Ft2 Shop edition. The first edition A includes the music video of "Gravity", the recording movie of "Mu-Chu-De Koishiteru" and the choreography lecture of "Gravity" by the members, while the first edition B includes "Gravity" multi-angle Music Video, "Gravity" MV making movie and "Gravity" special discussion. The main visual of the jacket is different for the First Edition A, First Edition B, Regular Edition, and Kis-My-Ft2 Shop Edition.

It was released in four forms:

- First edition A (AVCD-83534/B)
- First edition B (AVCD-83535/B)
- Regular edition (AVCD-83536)
- Kis-My-Ft2 Shop limited edition (AVC1-83537)

== Track listing ==
=== CD ===
- Normal Edition, Limited First Edition A/B
- Included only on the standard editions after "Crystal Sky"
1. Gravity (4:16)
2. Mu-chu-de Koishiteru (4:36)
3. Crystal Sky (3:59)
4. Gravity (Ballad version) (4:19)
- Kiss My Shop version
1. Gravity
2. Mu-chu-de Koishiteru
3. Crystal Sky
4. Welcome (4:23)

=== DVD ===
- Limited First Edition A
1. Gravity (Music Video)
2. Mu-chu-de Koishiteru (Recording Movie)
3. Gravity (Dance Lecture)
- Limited First Edition B
1. Gravity (Multi-angle Music Video)
2. Gravity (Making Movie)
3. Gravity (Special Discussion)
