= Yummy!! =

Studio album by Kis-My-Ft2
- Released: April 25, 2018
- Genre: J-pop
- Length: 68:26 (regular edition)
- Label: Avex Trax

Kis-My-Ft2 chronology
Music Colosseum (2017)	Yummy!! (2018)	Free Hugs! (2019)

Singles from Yummy!!
- 1. "Pick It Up (Kis-My-Ft2 song)" Released: June 7, 2017; 2. "Akai Kajitsu" Released: November 1, 2017

Music video
- "Yummy!" All Songs Playlist on YouTube; Teaser of "Kismatsu-so apartment" on YouTube; Digest of "Yujo wo Kuttuke te" on YouTube; Digest of "Invitation" on YouTube; Digest of "Happy Day" on YouTube; Digest of "Super Tasty!" on YouTube; Digest of "Yummy!!" on YouTube

Yummy!! (ヤミー!!) is the seventh original album by Japanese boy band Kis-My-Ft2, released on April 25, 2018, by Avex Trax.

== Overview ==
The album title "Yummy!" also means "You & me" because it sounds like "you & me” and it is a wish for a good relationship between Kis-My-Ft2 and you, the fans.

The lead song on the album is "Super Tasty!", but a music video for this song was not produced at this time.

The album contains 14 songs, including the singles "Pick It Up" (theme song for the TV series Sakurako-san no Ashiwa ni Mareta ni Buried Under the Dead Body featuring Fujigaya) and "Akai Kajitsu" (theme song for the TV series Juyo Sanko-nin Tantei featuring Tamamori), and 14 other songs in total. The accompanying DVD features Kis-My-Ft2's first attempt at a new genre, “Music Drama Variety Show with Animation. The members try their hand at various forms of entertainment, including not only music, but also drama, comedy, documentary, and dance.

In addition to the 14 songs, the regular edition only includes 18 songs, including solo songs by Kitayama, Fujigaya, and Tamamori, and a new introduction song by Kis-My-Ft2, "We Are Kis-My-Ft2!".

The bonus videos which are included first edition A and B, "Kismatsu-so apartment Kis-My-Ft2's 7 years reconciliation missions," is a different music video from the previous ones. This video is in two parts, the first part and the second part. The setting for this video special is a men's dormitory called "Kismatsu-so apartment". In it, they dance to music, act out skits and dramas, sometimes changing their appearance into anime characters. The members unfold the seven “reconciliation missions” in this 80-minute epic.

In addition to this, first edition A includes "KIS-MY-TV" and the first edition B include "Kis-My Sports Championship (Funny sports)". In addition, the first edition B includes seven jacket cards with visuals of the members.

== Background ==
Since this is the seventh anniversary of the seven-member group's debut and their seventh album, the special single "You & Me" was released on the same day on Seven Net in a limited edition of 77,777 copies for complete production. This is the same as the album title "Yummy!," which means that You (fans) and Me (Kis-My-Ft2) will have a "delicious relationship".

== Charts ==
The album debuted at No. 1 on the Oricon Weekly Albums Chart dated May 07, 2018. This is the eighth consecutive album since their first album "Kis-My-1st" (2012) to reach No. 1. They are the second group in history, after KinKi Kids (12 consecutive albums), to have achieved first-week sales of more than 200,000 copies for eight consecutive albums since their first album.

== Package specifications ==
The album was released in three formats:

- First edition A CD, DVD (AVCD-93876/B)
- First edition B CD, DVD (AVCD-93877/B)
- Regular edition CD (AVCD-93878)

== Track listing ==
=== CD ===
1. "7th Overture" (inst.) [1:06]
2. "Invitation" [4:05]
3. "Mr. Star Light" [3:28]
4. "Pick It Up" [3:36] (Japanese only)
5. "Break The Chains" [4:29]
6. "Toxxxic" [3:53] by Taisuke Fujigaya (regular edition only)
7. "Mirage" [3:53]
8. "Ka ku shi go to" [4:04] by Hiromitsu Kitayama (regular edition only)
9. "Selfie" [4:15]
10. "Seishun Don't Stop!" [3:47]
11. "Super Tasty!"
12. "Clap-A-Holics" [3:46] by Yuta Tamamori (regular edition only)
13. "Akai Kajitsu" [4:14]
14. "Real me" [3:16] by Hiromitsu Kitayama, Taisuke Fujigaya
15. "We are Kis-My-Ft2!" [4:06] (regular edition only)

=== DVD ===
- First Edition A
  - "Kismatsu-so apartment Kis-My-Ft2's 7 years reconciliation missions Part 1"
  - "Kis-My-TV Kiss My Goroku"
- First Edition B
  - "Kismatsu-so apartment Kis-My-Ft2's 7 years reconciliation missions Part 2"
  - "Kis-My Sports Championship Bubble Soccer (Funny Sports)"
