= Thank You Jan! =

Single by Kis-My-Ft2

from the album Kis-My-World
- B-side: "Because I can meet you"; "Holy night with you"; "Christmas Kiss"
- Released: December 24, 2014 (Japan)
- Genre: J-pop
- Length: 4:46
- Label: Avex Trax
- Composer: Shinya Tada
- Lyricist: Osamu Suzuki

Kis-My-Ft2 singles chronology
"Another Future" (2014)	"Thank You Jan!" (2014)	"Kiss Damashii" (2014)

Music video
- "Thank You Jan!" on YouTube

"Thank You Jan!" (Japanese: Thank youじゃん!, Hepburn: san kyuu jan) is a 12th single by Japanese boy band Kis-My-Ft2. It was released on December 24, 2014. It debuted at number one on the weekly Oricon Weekly Singles Chart.

== Promotion ==
The release of this album was announced during the November 7 Tokyo Dome performance of the live tour Kis-My-Journey.

The CD was released in 11 formats in five types: two limited editions, regular edition, seven Kiss My Shop formats (7 versions with solo jackets for each of the 7 members), and a Seven & i format. A lottery was held at stores nationwide as an in-store purchase privilege.

On December 24, the CD release date, Kis-My-Ft2 members were divided into three groups and held an event across Japan.

Yuta Tamamori and Toshiya Miyata made radio and other media appearances and held high-touch events in Sendai and Sapporo (Sapporo Factory), Hiromitsu Kitayama, Takashi Nikaido, and Kento Senga in Kobe and Nagasaki (Huis Ten Bosch), and Taisuke Fujigaya and Wataru Yokoo in Aichi (Chubu Centrair International Airport) and Okinawa (San-A Naha Main Place), first time for Yokoo. This event was included in the DVD that came with the 13th single CD "Kiss Spirits" (Seven & I version).

The event "New Year Kis-My-Fuku-Bukuro -Thank you for your support this year!" (The DVD "2015 Concert Tour Kis-My-World" (Regular Edition)) contains a digest of the event, which was held at Yokohama Arena for 11 performances over 4 days from January 5 to 8, 2015.

== Music video ==
The music video was filmed over a 20-hour period on the day after the last day of the "2014 live tour Kis-My-Journey". The dancers dress up in Santa Claus costumes, or as the Seven Lucky Gods, in honor of Christmas Eve, the day of the release, and dance in motifs of "sheep" and "rock-paper-scissors" in honor of the following year, 2015, the year of "snake" (the year before). The dance was choreographed by Lucky Ikeda. In the "Multi-Angle Music Video" included in the B version of the MV included in the limited first pressing A/B, 134,217,728 possible combinations can be viewed by selecting eight angles of your choice in all nine scenes.

== Chart performance ==
The single sold 436,000 copies in its first week, reaching No. 1 on the Oricon Weekly Singles Chart. This is the highest number of copies sold since their debut in August 2011, and they are the second male artist this year, after Arashi, to surpass 400,000 copies in their first week. It also topped the overall Billboard Japan Hot 100.

== Package specifications ==
The CD is available in 11 formats,

- First edition A
- First edition B
- Regular edition
- Seven Kiss My Shop edition (7 versions with solo jackets for each of the 7 members)
- Seven & i edition

It was also pre-released on dwango.jp on December 10.

== Track listing ==
=== CD ===
- Normal and Limited First Edition A/B
- Included only on the standard editions after "Holy night with you"
1. "Thank You Jan!" (4:46)
2. "Because I can meet you" (4:51)
3. "Holy night with you" (4:30)
4. "Christmas Kiss" (4:46)
- Seven & i version, Kiss My Shop version
1. "Thank You Jan!"
2. "Because I can meet you"
3. "Holy night with you"
4. "Thank You Jan!" (Happy Winter ver.) (4:46)

=== DVD ===
- Limited First Edition A
1. "Thank You Jan!" Music video
2. The members teach the choreography of "Thank You Jan!" Choreography
- Limited First Edition B
1. "Thank You Jan!" Multi-angle MV
2. "Thank You Jan!" Music video and making video of jacket shooting
- Seven & i disc
1. Seven-Eleven Japan "Kis-My-Ft2 Campaign" CM making video
2. "Thank You Jan!" Recording close-up footage (narration: Yuta Tamamori)
