= Kis-My-1st =

Studio album by Kis-My-Ft2
- Released: March 28, 2012
- Recorded: 2011–2012
- Genre: J-pop
- Label: Avex Trax

Kis-My-Ft2 chronology
Kis-My-1st (2012)	Good Ikuze! (2013)

Singles from Kis-My-1st
- 1. "Everybody Go" Released: August 10, 2011; 2. "We Never Give Up!" Released: December 14, 2011; 3. "She! Her! Her!" Released: March 21, 2012

Kis-My-1st is the first album by Japanese boy group Kis-My-Ft2. The album has spawned three singles. The album's promotional tour ran between March 31 and June 3, 2012.

== Overview ==
Kis-My-1st is the first album by Kis-My-Ft2, released on March 28, 2012. It was released one week after the third single "She! Her! Her!" was released on March 21, 2012. With this album, their concert tour Kis-My-MiNT Tour was held from March 31, 2012.

The DVD for the first edition A includes the music videos of "Fire Beat" and "Inori", the making movie of the videos, and "Kis-My-Ft2 History."

The bonus CD for the first edition B's bonus CD "Kis-My-Zero" includes 8 songs from before their debut.

The booklet of the Kis-My Shop Limited Edition features a photo of the members at their pajama party, as seen on the jacket. In addition, a DVD containing the special video "Ashiato" and a stapler will be included as a bonus. In "Ashiato", each of the seven members talks about their past memories before their debut.

== Package specifications ==
- Regular edition (CD only)
- First edition A (CD, DVD)
- First edition B (CD, Special CD Kis-My-Zero)
- Kis-My-Ft2 SHOP limited edition (CD, Privilege).

== Track listing ==
CD

No.	Title	Length
1.	""1st" Overture"
2.	"Girl Is Mine"
3.	"She! Her! Her!"
4.	"Tabidachi no Uta"
5.	"Love Meee"
6.	"『Sanagi』"
7.	"Catch & Go!!"
8.	"Everybody Go"
9.	"Take Over"
10.	"Kickin' It"
11.	"Sing for You"
12.	"We Never Give Up!"
13.	"Good Night"
14.	"Dancing Star (Regular edition only)"
15.	"Tell me why (Regular edition only)"

First edition A

DVD
No.	Title	Length
1.	"Fire Beat (Music Video)"
2.	"Inori (Music Video)"
3.	"Music video's making movie"
4.	"Kis-My-Ft2 members interview"

First edition B

Special CD 'Kis-My-Zero'
No.	Title	Length
1.	"Endless Road"
2.	"Inori"
3.	"Kis-My-Me-Mine"
4.	"Good-bye, Thank You"
5.	"Fire Beat"
6.	"Smile"
7.	"Eien no Ticket"
8.	"3D Girl"

== Charts ==
Released	Oricon Chart	Peak	Debut sales	Sales total
March 28, 2012	Daily Chart	1	143,045	340,214
March 28, 2012	Weekly Chart	1	253,807	340,214
March 28, 2012	Monthly Chart	1	275,789	340,214

=== Singles chart ===
Song	Peak position
Song	JPN
"Everybody Go"	1
"We Never Give Up!"	1
"She! Her! Her!"	1
