= She! Her! Her! =

Single by Kis-My-Ft2

from the album Kis-My-1st
- B-side: "Deep your voice"
- Released: March 21, 2012 (Japan)
- Genre: J-pop
- Length: 08：31
- Label: Avex Trax

Kis-My-Ft2 singles chronology
"We Never Give Up!" (2011)	"She! Her! Her!" (2012)	"Wanna Beeee!!!/Shake It Up" (2013)

Music video
- "She! Her! Her!" on YouTube

"She! Her! Her!" is a single by Japanese boy band Kis-My-Ft2. It was released on March 21, 2012.

== Overview ==
The title song "She! Her! Her!" was the TV commercial theme song of glico chewing gum "Watering Kiss Mint gum" in which Kis-My-Ft2 appeared.

The title lyric "She Her Her" and the choreography of their exhale are matched to the image of the chewing gum's selling point, "eat it and make your breath fresh." The cover art for this single is an impressive scene of Kis-My-Ft2 exhaling seven-colored breath from their mouth, and a female version of the jacket was also created. A PR truck for this song ran around various parts of Tokyo and became a hot topic.

On March 21, the day of the release, they held a surprise event in Osaka. They appeared on a cruise ship on Dōtonbori canal, which runs through the center of town, and performed new songs, including "She! Her! Her!". The location is also famous for its large Glico Company sign.

== Chart performances ==
It debuted in number one on the weekly Oricon Singles Chart and reached number one on the Billboard Japan Hot 100. It was the 16th best-selling single in Japan in 2012, with 355,374 copies.

== Tracking information ==
=== CD ===
1. "She! Her! Her!" (4:39) Choreography is by Kento Senga.
2. "Deep your voice" (3:51) (Fuji TV's variety show "Moshi Mo Tours" theme song)

=== DVD ===
- First Press Limited Edition only
1. "She! Her! Her!" (Music Video)
2. "She! Her! Her!" (Making Movie)
3. Glico chewing gum "Watering Kissmint Gum" (CM)
4. Glico chewing gum "Watering Kissmint Gum" (Making Movie)
