= Hesomagari/Koko ni Shikanai Keshiki =

"Hesomagari/Koko Ni Shikanai Keshiki"

Single by Kanjani Eight
- Released: April 24, 2013 (Japan)

Kanjani Eight singles chronology
"Aoppana" (2012)	"Hesomagari/Koko Ni Shikanai Keshiki" (2013)	"Namida no Kotae" (2013)

"Hesomagari/Koko Ni Shikanai Keshiki" (へそ曲がり/ここにしかない景色) is a single by Japanese boy band Kanjani Eight. It was released on April 24, 2013. It debuted in number one on the weekly Oricon Singles Chart and reached number one on the Billboard Japan Hot 100.
