= Wanna Beeee!!!/Shake It Up =

Single by Kis-My-Ft2

from the album Good Ikuze!
- A-side: "Wanna Beeee!!!"; "Shake It Up"
- B-side: "Summer Lover"
- Released: August 15, 2012 (Japan)
- Genre: J-pop
- Length: 8:28
- Label: Avex Trax

Kis-My-Ft2 singles chronology
"She! Her! Her!" (2012)	"Wanna Beeee!!!/Shake It Up" (2012)	"Ai no Beat" (2013)

Music video
- "Wanna Beeee!!!" on YouTube "Shake It Up" on YouTube

"Wanna Beeee!!!/Shake It Up" is 4th single by Japanese boy band Kis-My-Ft2. It was released on August 15, 2012.

It is the group’s first double A-side single. "Wanna Beeee!!!" served as the theme song for the TBS TV drama Beginners! starring Taisuke Fujigaya and Hiromitsu Kitayama,while "Shake It Up" was used as the theme for the Nippon TV drama Shiritsu Bakaleya Koukou, featuring Toshiya Miyata.

== Overview ==
“Wanna Beeee!!!” is an upbeat, summer-themed song with a lively tempo and bright atmosphere. The music video opens with the members dressed as pirates, performing a dynamic dance sequence that features acrobatics by Kento Senga and Takashi Nikaido. Set aboard a pirate ship, the video shows them looking at a treasure map, arm wrestling, fishing up roller skates, and eating watermelon. One memorable scene depicts Fujigaya transforming into the sun, which was said to reflect his cheerful character Teppei Shimura from Beginners!, and became a topic of conversation among fans.

“Shake It Up” is a cool and sexy song that stands apart from conventional idol pop. The music video was reportedly filmed in a real nightclub with about 100 dancers. Fujigaya, who is known as the group’s “sexy” member, stood out in this video wearing a leopard-print jacket and performing with a sensual expression, giving the song a distinctive and stylish tone. The track incorporates a significant amount of rap elements, creating a cool and edgy image.

== Chart performance ==
It debuted in number one on the weekly Oricon Singles Chart and reached number one on the Billboard Japan Hot 100. It was the 16th best-selling single in Japan in 2012, with 355,374 copies.

With initial sales of 285,000 copies, "Shake It Up" debuted at No. 1 on the Oricon Weekly Singles Chart dated August 27, 2012.

== Track listing ==
=== CD ===
1. "Wanna Beeee!!!" (4:10)
2. "Shake It Up" (4:18)
3. "Summer Lover" (3:25)

=== DVD ===
- First edition "Wanna Beeee!!!"
1. "Wanna Beeee!!!" (Music Video)
2. "Wanna Beeee!!!" (Off shot)
- First edition "Shake It Up"
1. "Shake It Up" (Music Video)
2. "Shake It Up" (Off shot)
