= We Never Give Up! =

Single by Kis-My-Ft2

from the album Kis-My-1st
- B-side: "Kis-My-Venus"; "Love is You"
- Released: December 14, 2011 (Japan)

Kis-My-Ft2 singles chronology
| "Everybody Go" (2011) | "We Never Give Up!" (2011) | "She! Her! Her!" (2012) |

Music video
- "We Never Give Up!" on YouTube

"We Never Give Up!" is the second single by Japanese boy band Kis-My-Ft2 released on December 14, 2011.

== Overview ==
This was the second single by Kis-My-Ft2 and was released on December 14, 2011. The song "We Never Give Up!," which is also the title track, is the theme song for the TV commercial of Lawson's comprehensive entertainment service "Elpaca."

It was released in three versions. Two limited first editions with DVDs and a regular edition. The Limited First Edition A includes the music video of the title song and a rare off-shot movie, while the first pressing limited edition B includes a special video digest of 7 to 8 songs from the Tokyo Dome performance Kis-My-Ft2 Debut Tour 2011 Everybody Go to Tokyo Dome on August 28, 2011. The "Kis-My Shop Limited Edition" includes a 24-page photo book and a poster (Kis-My Shop version) as two special features.

The title song was performed at the 71st NHK Kōhaku Uta Gassen broadcast on December 31, 2020.

Regarding the music video, it is known that the members later described it as "a symbol of an era of inequality." At the time, three members were promoted more strongly, while the other four wore plain outfits and danced in the background. Their Maroon shirts appeared noticeably less flashy than the costumes worn by the others.

Although these distinctions no longer exist today, the members have stated that this period was a difficult time for them.

== Chart performances ==
It debuted in number one on the weekly Oricon Singles Chart and reached number one on the Billboard Japan Hot 100. It was the 18th best-selling single in Japan in 2012, with 321,573 copies.

== Track listing ==
=== CD ===
- Normal Edition, First Press Limited Edition (Music Video/Tokyo Dome Edition), Kiss My Shop Limited Edition
1. "We never give up!"
  - Lawson "Elpaca" CM song
2. "Kis-My-Venus" [4:27] (Fuji Television's "Moshi Mo Tours" theme song)
3. "Love is you" [3:36] (Lawson/HMV limited edition)
4. "We never give up!"
5. "Everybody Go" (Kis-My-Ft2 Debut Tour 2011 Everybody Go to Tokyo Dome Version)
6. Kis-My-Special Comment

=== DVD ===
- First Press Limited (Music video)
1. "We never give up!" music video
2. Music video Making Movie
- Limited First Edition "Kis-My-Ft2 Debut Tour 2011 Everybody Go to Tokyo Dome" (Digest Movie)
1. "Everybody Go"
2. "Youths"
3. "Kis-My-Land"
4. "S.O.KISS"
5. "Prayer"
6. "Fire Beat"
7. "Kiss For U"
8. "Everybody Go"
