= Ai no Beat =

Single by Kis-My-Ft2

from the album Good Ikuze!
- B-side: "Winter Lover"; "Never End Love"
- Released: November 14, 2012 (Japan)
- Genre: J-pop
- Length: 13:39
- Label: Avex Trax

Kis-My-Ft2 singles chronology
"Wanna Beeee!!!/Shake It Up" (2012)	"Ai no Beat" (2012)	"My Resistance (Something that can't be helped)/Fate Girl" (2013)

Music video
- "Ai no Beat" (Dance ver.) on YouTube "Ai no Beat" (Rock ver.) on YouTube

Professional ratings
Review scores
Source	Rating
Rolling Stone Japan	2.5/5 stars

"Ai no Beat" (Japanese: アイノビート, Hepburn: Ai no bīto) is the 5th single by Japanese boy band Kis-My-Ft2, released on November 14, 2012.

Two versions of this song were produced with different arrangements. One is a dance version and the other is a rock version.

== Chart performance ==
It debuted at number one on the weekly Oricon Singles Chart and reached number one on the Billboard Japan Hot 100. It was the 21st best-selling single in Japan in 2012, with 291,265 copies.

== Track listing ==
=== CD ===
- Normal Edition, Limited First Edition (Dance Edition), Kiss My SHOP Edition <Christmas spec
1. "Ai no Beat" (Dance ver.) [4:21]
2. "Ai no Beat" (Rock ver.) [4:29]
3. "Winter Lover" [4:47].
  - Theme song for Fuji Television's “Moshi Mo Tours"
4. "Never end love" [4:47] (Regular edition only)
- Limited first pressing (Rock edition)
1. "Ai no Beat" (Rock ver.)
2. "Ai no Beat" (Dance ver.)
3. "Winter Lover"

=== DVD ===
- Limited First Edition (Dance edition)
1. "Ai no Beat" (Dance ver.) (Music Video)
2. "Ai no Beat" (Dance ver.) (Music Video Making Movie)
- Limited First Edition (Rock edition)
1. "Ai no Beat" (Rock ver.) (Music Video)
2. "Ai no Beat" (Rock ver.) (Music Video Making Movie)
