= Inter (Kis-My-Ft2 single) =

Single by Kis-My-Ft2

from the album Music Colosseum
- A-side: "Tonight"; "Kimi no Iru Sekai"; "Seven Wishes"
- B-side: "Zenryoku fighter"
- Released: March 1, 2017 (Japan)
- Genre: J-pop
- Length: 13:50
- Label: Avex Trax

Kis-My-Ft2 singles chronology
"Sha la la Summer Time" (2016)	"Inter" (2017)	"Pick It Up" (2017)

Music video
- Tonight on YouTube; Kimi no Iru Sekai on YouTube

"Inter" is Kis-My-Ft2's 18th single and his first triple A-side single, released on March 1, 2017, by Avex Trax.

== Overview ==
This is their first single in about 7 months since their previous single "Sha la la Summer Time" and their first triple A-side single. All three songs on the triple A-side are commercial tie-ups.

The CD is a triple A-side single consisting of three songs: "Tonight", "Kimi no Iru Sekai", and "Seven Wishes". First Edition A DVD included Music Video for "Tonight" with a wild and sexy theme, while First Edition B DVD came with the PV for "The World Where You Are" with a love and cute theme and a making-of featurette.

The music video for "Tonight" is the aggressive dance performance with a full-frontal badboys, the CG images are also a highlight of the video. As if to show the rising fighting spirit of the members, a huge coliseum gradually emerges from the rocky mountains. The Colosseum in the video is based on the motif of the Colosseum in ancient Rome and incorporates elements of Japanese castles, creating an innovative giant circular structure that blends the Japanese and Western worlds with the help of CG technology. In the music video, the full Colosseum is revealed in the latter half of the song, and the story follows the members' journey to the Colosseum. The costumes are a blend of Japanese and Western styles, with all members revealing the skin of their right arms in pursuit of sexiness.

Also, for the first time in a single song, member Kento Senga is in charge of choreography. The dance performance is a dance performance that fully expresses the sense of badboys that is the starting point of Kis-My-Ft2. Senga commented, "I made the sexy choreography for this dance with the feeling of inviting women, so I hope you will be excited to see it.

The filming took place indoors in extremely cold temperatures of 2 degrees Celsius, and the dance scenes, in which the members were divided into solos and groups, were arranged by the members, with Nikaido and Senga incorporating backflips.

Nikaido said, "I think you can see the sense of badboys of Kis-My-Ft2 in this music video, so please look forward to it!". Tamamori added, "It's been a while since I've done a music video that focuses on dance, so I think it's worth watching. This single is a triple A-side, so I hope you can enjoy the different atmospheres of Kis-My-Ft2".

The music video for "Kimino Iru Sekai", the other A-side song, is based on the concept of "Love & Cute," with the seven members acting as "grooms" for a "special day with your loved one." The video was filmed in a replica of an 18th- to 19th-century English aristocratic residence, which was also used as an antique wedding venue. Since the video was shot with the image of the "precious one" behind the camera, the viewer's eye is more focused on the camera than in a regular music video, making the video seem as if the seven groomsmen are escorting the bride to the wedding. On the day of shooting, it was extremely cold and windy in early January, and the members even had to check each other's noses to make sure they were not snotty.

== Chart performance ==
In the Oricon Weekly Singles Chart dated March 13, 2017, "Inter" debuted at No. 1 with 205,000 copies sold in its first week. With this single, the group has broken the record of 18 consecutive singles at the top spot since its debut single, which is the fifth best record in its history. "Tonight" also topped the Billboard Japan Hot 100 on the same day. First week sales: 205,229 copies

== Package specifications ==
It was released in three forms:

- First edition A, CD & DVD (AVCD-83796/B)
- First edition B, CD & DVD (AVCD-83797/B)
- Regular edition, CD (AVCD-83798)

== Track listing ==
=== CD ===
1. "Tonight" (4:04)
2. "Kimi no Iru Sekai" (5:19)
3. "Seven wishes" (4:28)
4. "Zenryoku Fighter" (3:30) (regular edition only)

=== DVD ===
- First Edition A
1. "Tonight" (Music Video)
2. "Tonight" (Making Movie)
- First Edition B
1. "Kimi no Iru Sekai" (Music Video)
2. "Kimi no Iru Sekai" (Making Movie)
