= Pintokona =

Japanese manga series

ぴんとこな
- Genre: Romance
- Manga
- Written by: Ako Shimaki
- Published by: Shogakukan
- Magazine: Cheese!
- Original run: 2009 – 2015
- Volumes: 16
- Television drama
- Original network: TBS
- Original run: 18 July 2013 – 19 September 2013

Pintokona (ぴんとこな) (Note: 'Pintokona' is the role of a man of colour with softness and gentleness, but also with a firm core strength.) is a Japanese romance manga series written and illustrated by Ako Shimaki. It was serialized from the November 2009 issue to the November 2015 issue by Shogakukan in Cheese!. The manga books published 16 volumes (complete) by Shogakukan. It was adapted into a Japanese television drama series in 2013.

== Synopsis ==
In the Kabuki world, where family is highly valued, Kyonosuke lacks ability despite being born the heir to a prestigious family. Kazuya was born into a family with no connection to kabuki, but he tries to rise from the bottom with only his abilities. The story begins when these two opposites fall in love with the same girl, Ayame. Kyonosuke, who wants to be liked by Ayame for his love of kabuki, cries in frustration, saying that he wants her ability more than the title of heir. Kazuya, who wants to play the leading role in front of Ayame, plans to be adopted by a prestigious family.

== Characters ==
- Kyōnosuke Kawamura - Protagonist and sergeant of the prestigious Kijimaya kabuki house.
- Ichiya Sawayama - Disciple of the Kabuki house Todorokiya. Ayame was a classmate of his in primary school.
- Ayame Chiba - Heroine of this story. Influenced by her mother, who died of illness, she loves Kabuki.

== Reception ==
It won the Shogakukan Manga Award for shōjo manga in 2011 and it was number eight on the 2012 Kono Manga ga Sugoi! Top 20 Manga for Female Readers survey.

Volume 7 reached the 29th place on the Japanese weekly manga chart and, as of 1 July 2012, has sold 35,767 copies. Volume 9 reached the 50th place and, as of 27 April 2013, has sold 24,319 copies. Volume 10 reached the 21st place and, as of 4 August 2013, has sold 67,825 copies. Volume 11 reached the 18th place and, as of 2 February 2014, has sold 62,372 copies. Volume 12 reached the 24th place, and, as of 6 July 2014, has sold 55,031 copies.

== Bibliographic Information ==
- Ako Shimaki Pintokona Shogakukan (Cheese! Flower Comics), 16 volumes
  - volume 1 26 February 2010, ISBN 978-4-09-133049-9
  - Volume 2 26 August 2010, ISBN 978-4-09-133357-5
  - Volume 3 26 January 2011, ISBN 978-4-09-133713-9
  - Volume 4 26 May 2011, ISBN 978-4-09-133860-0
  - Volume 5 26 July 2011, ISBN 978-4-09-133632-3
  - Volume 6 26 December 2011, ISBN 978-4-09-134197-6
  - Volume 7 26 June 2012, ISBN 978-4-09-134447-2
  - Volume 8 26 November 2012, ISBN 978-4-09-134810-4
  - Volume 9 26 April 2013, ISBN 978-4-09-135024-4
  - Volume 10 26 July 2013, ISBN 978-4-09-135509-6
  - Volume 11 24 January 2014, ISBN 978-4-09-135816-5
  - Volume 12 26 June 2014, ISBN 978-4-09-135870-7
  - Volume 13 24 October 2014, ISBN 978-4-09-136457-9
  - Volume 14 26 February 2015, ISBN 978-4-09-136897-3
  - Volume 15 26 June 2015, ISBN 978-4-09-137348-9
  - Volume 16 26 November 2015, ISBN 978-4-09-138040-1

== Television Drama ==
Pintokona
- ぴんとこな
- Genre: Drama; Romantic drama
- Written by: Maki Takahashi
- Directed by: Yuto Kawai, Shingo Okamoto, Daisuke Yamamuro
- Starring: Yuta Tamamori
- Music by: Yoshihisa Hirano, Yutaka Shinya
- Opening theme: "A Miracle with You" by Kis-My-Ft2
- Country of origin: Japan
- Original language: Japanese
- No. of episodes: 10

Production
- Producers: Masanao Takahashi, Jingo Itoh (Shochiku)
- Running time: 54 min (The first session was expanded by 69 minutes.)
- Production company: TBS Television (Japan)

Original release
- Network: TBS Television (Japan)
- Release: 18 July – 19 September 2013

It was adapted into a Television drama under the title Pintokona, (Note: 'Pintokona' is a Kabuki term referring to roles with a soft sexuality, but with a masculine strength rather than a feminine one.) which was broadcast in the TBS Television (Japan) Thursday Drama 9 slot (21:00 - 21:54, JST) from 18 July to 19 September 2013.

It starred Yuta Tamamori of Kis-My-Ft2. It was Tamamori's first starring role in a prime-time drama series. The heroine is Umika Kawashima. Yuma Nakayama and Jessie (a member of SixTONES) are also making their first appearances in a TBS Television (Japan) drama series. The drama also included acting and gesture coaching by current Kabuki actors.

The catchphrase is "Midsummer's heart-throb love from the handsome son of a distinguished family of the Kabuki world". (Note: The booklet handed out to the cast and crew on set read "Midsummer Super, heartpounding, the ultimate love story!" The catchphrase was written.)

=== For Dramatization ===
Yuta Tamamori, the lead actor of the drama, explained the role of Kyonosuke, saying, "He is a no-good heir who is unmotivated about Kabuki and skips his training, but in fact he is a very pure and passionate man with a single-minded core." He also commented that this is the first drama series in history to use kabuki as its subject matter, "I am anxious and nervous, but I will do my best so as not to tarnish the 400-year history of kabuki," he declared emphatically. Nakayama, on the other hand, was enthusiastic about his rival Ichiya, saying, "Ichiya was not born into a prestigious family, but he loves Kabuki and works harder than anyone else.

When asked by a reporter about a story that made her heart flutter recently, Umika Kawashima shared an episode in which she made Tamamori eat wasabi chocolate as part of a TV show project. With a smile, Kawashima replied, "He ate the spicy wasabi chocolate right away, even though he doesn't like spicy food." Tamamori, on the other hand, smiled and replied, "I ate it because Umika said she made it herself," much to Kawashima's delight.

=== Synopsis ===
Kyonosuke Kawamura (Yuta Tamamori) is an heir of the prestigious Kijimaya Kabuki theater. With his good looks and voice, he is called the prince of the Kabuki world and is very popular, but his "lack of motivation" is a drawback. This is because in the world of Kabuki, blood is considered more important than anything else, as the heir to a prominent family, he has carried high expectations for himself since he was a child, but no matter how hard he tries, his father and master, Kawamura Sezaemon (Goro Kishitani), does not approve of him.
One day, Kyonosuke played the leading role of a lion in a kabuki play, The Mirror Lion(春興鏡獅子). When he leaves the theater after the performance, Ayame Chiba (Umika Kawashima), who goes to the same high school as Kyonosuke, tells him, "That's no The Mirror Lion! I want my money back!". Ayame was a big Kabuki fan, influenced by her mother who had died. She could not tolerate an uninspiring performance. Surprised, Kyonosuke gets desperate and goes out with his friends, but then gets into an argument with his father. Kyonosuke said, "I wasn't born into this family because I wanted to. I'm fed up with a father who only cares about protecting the house and his own reputation," Kyonosuke says, his face filled with sadness.

=== Main characters (TV drama) ===
Kawamura Kyonosuke - Yuta Tamamori (Kis-My-Ft2)
Heir of Kijimaya. Real name: Takeshi Kawamura. Class A, 3rd year at Kyosei Gakuen High School.
Ichiya Sawayama - Yuma Nakayama
Apprentice of Todoroya. Real name: Hongo Hiroki. Ayame was a classmate of his in primary school.
Chiba Ayame - Umika Kawashima
A third-year Class C student at Kyosei Gakuen High School. Influenced by her mother, who died due to illness, she fell in love with Kabuki.
Sakamoto, Haruhiko (Sakamoto Haruhiko) - Jesse (Johnny's Jr.))
Kyonosuke's best friend and classmate.
Chiaki Mishima - Mayu Kusakari
Ayame's best friend and a good friend. She works part-time with Ayame at the omusubi shop Inakaya.
Shohei Sawayama - Hokuto Matsumura - (Johnny's Jr.)
A disciple of Todoroya. Like Kazuya, he is also a graduate of the training school.
Yuna Sawayama - Aoi Yoshikura
Daughter of Todoroya. A second-year student at Kyosei Gakuen High School. She has a crush on her father's apprentice, Kazuya. She is bullied at school and is rescued by Ayame. She soon realises that Kazuya has feelings for Ayame and begins to feel intensely jealous.
Sezaemon Kawamura - Goro Kishitani
Kyonosuke's father. Lost his wife early. Believed in Kyonosuke's talent more than anyone else, but never praised him. This led to a deepening rift between him and Kyonosuke, but he praised him for the first time in the final episode when he saw Kyonosuke's Kabuki performance on the roof of the hospital.

=== Staff ===
- Original story - Ako Shimaki's Pintokona (serialised in Cheese! / Shogakukan)
- Screenplay - Maki Takahashi
- Music - Yoshihisa Hirano
- Director - Hayato Kawai, Shingo Okamoto, Daisuke Yamamuro
- Theme song - Kis-My-Ft2 "A Miracle with You" (Avex Trax)
- Producers - Masanao Takahashi, Jingo Ito (Shochiku)
- Production cooperation - Shochiku
- Production credits - TBS Television (Japan)

=== Broadcast Schedule ===
	Date	Subtitle	Director	Rating
#1	18 July 2013	Brilliant and gorgeous! A heart-throbbing love triangle presented by a handsome sergeant in the world of Japanese beauty and kabuki! And a father and son with 400 years of tradition - one day they will surpass their father!	Yuto Kawai	8.7%
#2	25 July 2013	A sad one-sided love... A no-good sergeant becomes stronger through the power of love!	Yuto Kawai	7.6%
#3	1 August 2013	Unreachable feelings... for her one true love.	Shingo Okamoto	8.7%
#4	8 August 2013	Sea camp! Just for you... the best confession	Shingo Okamoto	5.9%
#5	15 August 2013	The end of everything... the shocking end! Crying on stage!	Daisuke Yamamuro	7.4%
#6	22 August 2013	Banned from the Kabuki world! The future is now closed.	Daisuke Yamamuro	5.9%
#7	29 August 2013	The flames of jealousy are like arrows... an all-out attack of malice that gnaws at the heart of love.	Yuto Kawai	7.0%
#8	5 September 2013	Fate's love in big trouble! A beautiful model lures you into a sweet night trap.	Shingo Okamoto	6.7%
#9	12 September 2013	Goodbye doomed love... I will protect you even if I never see you again.	Daisuke Yamamuro	8.8%
#10	19 September 2013	Putting everything on stage for the last time... each with their tears and promises.	Shingo Okamoto	6.8%
Average Rating 7.5% (Ratings are for the Kantō region, according to Video Research).
