= Saigo mo Yappari Kimi =

Single by Kis-My-Ft2

from the album I Scream
- B-side: "Last Lover"; "On Your Mark"; "The Town Where You Are"
- Released: November 11, 2015
- Genre: J-pop
- Length: 5:07
- Label: Avex Trax
- Composer: Tsunku
- Lyricist: Tsunku

Kis-My-Ft2 singles chronology
"AAO" (2015)	"Saigo mo Yappari Kimi" (2015)	"Gravity" (2016)

Music video
- "Saigo mo Yappari Kimi" on YouTube

"Saigo mo Yappari Kimi" (最後もやっぱり君; lit. 'In the End It's You') is the 15th single song by Kis-My-Ft2, released on November 11, 2015, by Avex Trax.

== Overview ==
This is the theme song for the movie World of Delight, in which Tamamori stars. They perform a sign language performance in the music video, inspired by the handicap of the film's heroine.

This song is a love ballad by Tsunku for Kis-My-Ft2 about a man's pure love. Tsunku wrote the song based on his understanding of the movie's content, which is themed on a love story. Tsunku said, "In writing this song, I expressed the pure love of a man. When I was writing the song, I was thinking about the bonds between human hearts and minds, including family and friendship, and I was very surprised that the song turned out to be much stronger and much more tender than the love song I had in mind when I wrote it." Hiromitsu Kitayama commented that he was so moved when he first heard this song that he almost teared up.

This is the second consecutive two-month release with the previous one. Like the previous work, it is available in three forms: first pressing limited edition, standard edition, and Kis-My-Ft2 Shop limited edition. Kis-My-Talk is not included in the rental version.

== Chart performance ==
On the Oricon chart, it debuted at No. 1 for the week with sales of 191,000 copies. The single also topped the Billboard Japan Hot 100.

== Package specifications ==
It was released in three formats:

- First edition CD & DVD (AVCD-83394/B)
- Regular edition CD (AVCD-83395)
- Kis-My-Ft2 shop edition CD & DVD (AVC1-83396)

== Track listing ==
=== CD ===
- Only included in Regular edition after "On Your Mark"
1. "Saigo mo Yappari Kimi" (5:07)
  - Lyrics: Tsunku
  - Composer: Tsunku
  - Arranger: Kaoru Okubo
2. "Last Lover" (4:18)
3. "On Your Mark" (4:49)
4. "The Town Where You Are" (4:28)
5. "Kis-my-talk" (bonus track)

=== DVD ===
- Limited First Edition
1. Music video of "Saigo mo Yappari Kimi"
2. Making Documentary
- Kis-My-Ft2 shop Edition
1. Recording Documentary
