= Kimi, Boku =

Single by Kis-My-Ft2

from the album Free Hugs!
- B-side: "Rainy Days" (First edition A); "Sorairo" (First edition B); "Your Life" (Regular edition); "Still song for you" (Regular edition)
- Released: October 3, 2018
- Genre: J-pop
- Label: Avex Trax

Kis-My-Ft2 singles chronology
"Love" (2018)	"Kimi, Boku" (2018)	"Kimi wo Daisuki da" (2018)

Music video
- Kimi, Boku on YouTube

"Kimi, Boku" (君、僕。) lit. 'You, me.' is the 22nd single of Kis-My-Ft2, released on October 3, 2018, by Avex Trax.

== Overview ==
The title song is a television commercial song for Kowa's "Hokkairo Shin Nukkunukku Toban"(Hand warmer) featuring Kis-My-Ft2.

In the music video, they perform a high-speed step dance named "Kis step" during the interlude. In addition, the lyrics of the song are sprinkled with the seven colors of the members' colors, and for the first time in a single song.

All members have solo parts. In the music video, the scene where they dance in pure white costumes holding umbrellas of the members' colors is memorable.

This song is a royal love song, and the lyrics, "Kimi ga irukara Boku ga irunnda: (You are the reason I can be here), are a manifestation of that.

== Package specifications ==
Released in three forms. Each of the three forms includes a different coupling song, and all five songs are based on the theme of "The love song of you and me."

- First Edition A (AVCD-94185/B): CD, DVD
- First Edition B (AVCD-94186/B): CD, DVD
- Regular Edition (AVCD-94187): CD

== Chart performance ==
The single reached No. 1 on the Oricon Weekly Singles Chart dated October 15, 2018. This was their 22nd consecutive No. 1 single on the chart since their debut single "Everybody Go". First week sales: 194,768 copies (Oricon count). The single also topped the Billboard Japan Hot 100. By December 9, 2018, the album had sold a total of 212,629 copies and ranked #32 on the 2018 annual Oricon Album Ranking.

== Track listing ==
=== CD ===
- Regular Edition
1. "Kimi, Boku" (5:04)
2. "Your Life" (4:06)
3. "Still song for you" (3:19)
4. "Kis-My-Voice" (bonus track)

Three tracks of solo voice messages chosen by each member out of five: "Confession," "Cheer," "Kyun Kyun," "Good Night," and "Good Morning."

- First Edition A
1. "Kimi, Boku"
2. "Rainy Days" (3:28)
- First Edition B
1. "Kimi, Boku"
2. "Solairo" (5:24)

=== DVD ===
- First Edition A
1. "Kimi, Boku" Music Video
2. "Kimi, Boku" Music Video making document

Includes a lecture on the choreography of the step dance during the interlude.

- First Edition B
1. Kis-My-Party: Let's have fun with glamping!
