= Snow Dome no Yakusoku/Luv Sick =

Single by Kis-My-Ft2

from the album Hit! Hit! Hit!
- A-side: "Snow Dome no Yakusoku"; "Luv Sick"
- B-side: "I Want to be Popular Tonight"; "Lucky Seven!!"
- Released: November 13, 2013 (Japan)
- Genre: J-pop
- Length: 8:42(First A, B); 12:56(Regular edition)
- Label: Avex Trax

Kis-My-Ft2 singles chronology
"A Miracle with You" (2013)	"Snow Dome no Yakusoku/Luv Sick" (2013)	"Hikari no Signal" (2014)

Music video
- "Snow Dome no Yakusoku" on YouTube "Luv Sick" on YouTube

"Snow Dome no Yakusoku/Luv Sick" (Japanese: SNOW DOMEの約束 / Luv Sick, Hepburn: Sunō dōmu no yakusoku) is 9th single by Japanese boy band Kis-My-Ft2. It was released on November 13, 2013.

"Snow Dome no Yakusoku" was a commercial song for Seven-Eleven Japan featuring the members of Kis-My-Ft2.

"Luv Sick" is the theme song for Nippon TV drama "Masked Teacher" in which Taisuke Fujigaya appears.

The song "I want to be popular tonight" included only in the regular edition is the theme song for the television series "Your Honor! I'm hungry!", starring Hiromitsu Kitayama. It was also the theme song for the dTV (Lemino) drama “Kaikan Installation” starring Hiromitsu Kitayama and Takashi Nikaido in 2020.

The concert tour Snow Dome no Yakusoku In Tokyo Dome and In Osaka Dome were held from 15 November 2013 to 15 December 2013. On January 29th of the following year, the live DVD Snow Dome no Yakusoku in Tokyo Dome 2013.11.16 was released.

== Chart performance ==
It debuted in number one on the weekly Oricon Singles Chart and reached number one on the Billboard Japan Hot 100. It was the 20th best-selling single in Japan in 2013, with 306,433 copies.

== Track listing ==
=== CD ===
- Regular Edition, First Edition A, Kis-My-Ft2 Shop edition
1. "Snow Dome no Yakusoku" [5:04]
2. "Luv Sick" [3:40]
3. "I Want to be Popular Tonight" [4:11] (only in the regular edition)
- Limited First Edition B
1. "Luv Sick"
2. "Snow Dome no Yakusoku"
- Seven & i Edition
1. "Snow Dome no Yakusoku"
2. "Luv Sick"
3. "Lucky Seven!" ［4:12]

=== DVD ===
- First Edition A
1. "Snow Dome no Yakusoku" (MV)
2. "Snow Dome no Yakusoku" (MV Making Movie)
- Limited First Edition B
1. "Luv Sick"（MUSIC VIDEO)
2. "Luv Sick"（MUSIC VIDEO Making Movie） First Press Limited Edition B
- Seven & i Disc
1. Seven-Eleven Japan “Seven-Eleven Fair” CM (Making Movie) Making Movie>
