= Girls' Rule =

2013 single by Nogizaka46

"Girls Rule"
- Type-C cover

Single by Nogizaka46

from the album Tōmei na Iro
- B-side: "Sekai de Ichiban Kodoku na Lover"; "Kōmori yo" (Type-A); "Senpūki" (Type-B); "Hoka no Hoshi Kara" (Type-C); "Ningen toiu Gakki" (Regular)
- Released: July 3, 2013
- Genre: J-pop
- Label: N46Div.
- Songwriters: Kōji Gotō; Mineaki Kawahara; Kidayo Kanetsu
- Producer: Yasushi Akimoto

Nogizaka46 singles chronology
"Kimi no Na wa Kibō" (2013)	"Girls Rule" (2013)	"Barrette" (2013)

Professional ratings
Review scores
Source	Rating
Rolling Stone Japan	2.5/5 stars

"Girls' Rule" (Japanese: ガールズルール, Hepburn: Gāruzurūru) is the sixth single by the Japanese idol girl group Nogizaka46. It reached the number one slot on the Oricon Singles Chart. It also reached number one on the Billboard Japan Hot 100. It was the 13th best-selling single in Japan in 2013, with 452,310 copies. The coupling song "Sekai de Ichiban Kodoku na Lover" was used as a featured song for NTV's night drama Bad Boys J and its live action film.

== Release ==
This single was released in 4 versions. Type-A, Type-B, Type-C and a regular edition. The center position in the choreography for the title song is held by Mai Shiraishi.

== Track listing ==
=== Type-A ===
CD
No.	Title	Length
1.	"Girls' Rule" (ガールズルール)	4:50
2.	"Sekai de Ichiban Kodoku na Lover" (世界で一番 孤独なLover)	3:44
3.	"Kōmori yo" (コウモリよ)	4:16
4.	"Girls' Rule (off vocal ver.)" (ガールズルール off vocal ver.)	4:50
5.	"Sekai de Ichiban Kodoku na Lover (off vocal ver.)" (世界で一番 孤独なLover off vocal ver.)	3:44
6.	"Kōmori yo (off vocal ver.)" (コウモリよ off vocal ver.)	4:15

DVD
No.	Title	Length
1.	"Girls' Rule Music Video"
2.	"Sekai de Ichiban Kodoku na Lover Music Video"
3.	"16 nin no Principal@PARCO Theater: Digest"

=== Type-B ===
CD
No.	Title	Length
1.	"Girls' Rule" (ガールズルール)	4:50
2.	"Sekai de Ichiban Kodoku na Lover" (世界で一番 孤独なLover)	3:44
3.	"Senpūki" (扇風機)	3:56
4.	"Girls' Rule (off vocal ver.)" (ガールズルール off vocal ver.)	4:50
5.	"Sekai de Ichiban Kodoku na Lover (off vocal ver.)" (世界で一番 孤独なLover off vocal ver.)	3:44
6.	"Senpūki (off vocal ver.)" (扇風機 off vocal ver.)	3:55

DVD
No.	Title	Length
1.	"Girls' Rule Music Video"
2.	"Senpūki Music Video"
3.	"Shoka no Zenryoku! Nogizaka46 Dai Undōkai"

=== Type-C ===
CD
No.	Title	Length
1.	"Girls' Rule" (ガールズルール)	4:50
2.	"Sekai de Ichiban Kodoku na Lover" (世界で一番 孤独なLover)	3:44
3.	"Hoka no Hoshi Kara" (他の星から)	4:09
4.	"Girls' Rule (off vocal ver.)" (ガールズルール off vocal ver.)	4:50
5.	"Sekai de Ichiban Kodoku na Lover (off vocal ver.)" (世界で一番 孤独なLover off vocal ver.)	3:44
6.	"Hoka no Hoshi Kara (off vocal ver.)" (他の星から off vocal ver.)	4:07

DVD
No.	Title	Length
1.	"Girls' Rule Music Video"
2.	"Hoka no Hoshi Kara Music Video"
3.	"Making of 6th Single"

=== Regular Edition ===
CD
No.	Title	Lyrics	Music	Artist(s)	Length
1.	"Girls' Rule" (ガールズルール)	Yasushi Akimoto	Koji Goto	Mai Shiraishi, et cetera	4:50
2.	"Sekai de Ichiban Kodoku na Lover" (世界で一番 孤独なLover)	Yasushi Akimoto	Mineaki Kawahara	Mai Shiraishi, et cetera	3:44
3.	"Ningen toiu Gakki" (人間という楽器)	Yasushi Akimoto	Kidayo Kanetsu		5:06
4.	"Girls' Rule (off vocal ver.)" (ガールズルール off vocal ver.)		Koji Goto		4:50
5.	"Sekai de Ichiban Kodoku na Lover (off vocal ver.)" (世界で一番 孤独なLover off vocal ver.)		Mineaki Kawahara		3:44
6.	"Ningen toiu Gakki (off vocal ver.)" (人間という楽器 off vocal ver.)		Kidayo Kanetsu		5:05

== Participating members ==
=== Girls’ Rule ===
Center: Mai Shiraishi

3rd Row: Marika Itō, Sayuri Inoue, Kana Nakada, Yumi Wakatsuki, Minami Hoshino, Manatsu Akimoto, Mai Fukagawa, Yūri Saitō

2nd Row: Reika Sakurai, Erika Ikuta, Rina Ikoma, Nanase Nishino, Kazumi Takayama

1st Row: Sayuri Matsumura, Mai Shiraishi (center), Nanami Hashimoto

=== Sekai de Ichiban Kodoku na Lover ===
Same as Girl's Rule participating members

=== Kōmori yo ===
Nogizaka46 1st Generation: Mai Shiraishi, Himeka Nakamoto, Ami Noujo, Yumi Wakatsuki

=== Senpūki ===
Sung by Nogizaka46 6th Single Under Members

Center: Asuka Saitō

Nogizaka46 1st Generation: Rena Ichiki, Nene Ito, Misa Eto, Yukina Kashiwa, Hina Kawago, Mahiro Kawamura, Asuka Saitō, Chiharu Saitō, Seira Nagashima, Himeka Nakamoto, Ami Noujo, Seira Hatanaka, Hina Higuchi, Seira Miyazawa, Rina Yamato, Maaya Wada

=== Hoka no Hoshi Kara ===
Center: Nanase Nishino

Nogizaka46 1st Generation: Marika Itō, Sayuri Inoue, Yūri Saitō, Reika Sakurai, Kana Nakada, Nanase Nishino, Yumi Wakatsuki

=== Ningen toiu Gakki ===
Sung by All Active Nogizaka46 Members

== Chart and certifications ==
=== Weekly charts ===
Chart (2013)	Peak position
Japan (Oricon Weekly Singles Chart)	1
Japan (Billboard Japan Hot 100)	1

=== Year-end charts ===
Chart (2013)	Peak position
Japan (Oricon Yearly Singles Chart)	13

=== Certifications ===
Region	Certification	Certified units/sales
Japan (RIAJ)	2× Platinum	500,000^{^}
^{^} Shipments figures based on certification alone.
