= Kamonegikkusu =

Single by NMB48
- Released: October 2, 2013
- Label: Laugh out loud!
- Songwriter: Yasushi Akimoto
- Producer: Yasushi Akimoto

NMB48 singles chronology
"Bokura no Eureka" (2013)	"Kamonegikkusu" (2013)	"Takane no Ringo" (2014)

"Kamonegikkusu" (カモネギックス, Kamonegikkusu; also Kamonegix) is the eighth single by Japanese girl group NMB48. It was released on October 2, 2013, and reached the number one on the weekly Oricon Singles Chart.

== Background ==
Kamonegikkusu means "Kamo ga negi wo shotte kuru" (lit. a duck comes carrying a green onion on its back) is a Japanese proverb that means a stroke of luck occurs, and things become more and more convenient. According to NMB48 member Sayaka Yamamoto, "The title was a coined word by Yasushi Akimoto". It is a song about a girl who despite being a convenience just like Kamonegi, does not learn from her mistakes and falls in love."

Due to restrictions from Avex Trax, full version MV from main track is included only in limited editions, and wasn't released on YouTube. Instead, an alternative dance version with an entire song was released.

== Release ==
The single was released in four versions: Type-A, Type-B, Type-C and Theater Edition.

== Personnel ==
=== "Kamonegikkusu" ===
(Center Position: Sayaka Yamamoto)

Members participating in this single are:

- Team N: Mayu Ogasawara, Kanako Kadowaki, Riho Kotani, Kei Jōnishi, Miru Shiroma, Sayaka Yamamoto, Akari Yoshida
- Team M: Yui Takano, Koromo, Airi Tanigawa, Keira Yogi, Nana Yamada
- Team BII: Yūka Katō, Shū Yabushita
- Team N / AKB48 Team B: Miyuki Watanabe, Miori Ichikawa
- Team M / AKB48 Team A: Fūko Yagura

=== "Sunglass to Uchiakebanashi" ===
- Kenkyūsei: Natsuko Akashi, Yuumi Ishida, Mizuki Uno, Mai Odan, Noa Ogawa, Chihiro Kawakami, Nagisa Shibuya, Momoka Shimazaki, Riko Takayama, Honoka Terui, Hiromi Nakagawa, Reina Nakano, Rurina Nishizawa, Momoka Hayashi, Chiho Matsuoka, Megumi Matsumura, Arisa Miura, Ayaka Morita, Rina Yamao

=== "Doshaburi no Seishun no Naka de" ===
Shirogumi

(Center Position: Sayaka Yamamoto)

- Team N：Rika Kishino, Haruna Kinoshita, Aika Nishimura, Sayaka Yamamoto
- Team M: Ayaka Okita, Ayaka Murakami, Natsumi Yamagishi, Nana Yamada
- Team BII: Anna Ijiri, Mirei Ueda, Emika Kamieda
- Kenkyūsei: Hiromi Nakagawa

=== "Omowase Kousen" ===
Akagumi

(Center Position: Miyuki Watanabe)

- Team N: Rina Kondo, Yuuki Yamaguchi, Miyuki Watanabe
- Team M: Rena Kawakami, Momoka Kinoshita, Rena Shimada, Mao Mita, Fuuko Yagura
- Team BII: Yuuri Ota, Rina Kushiro
- Kenkyūsei: Mai Odan, Rina Yamao

=== "Mou Hadashi ni Hanarenai" ===
Namba Teppoutai Sono 4

(Center Position: Sae Murase, Nagisa Shibuya)

- Team M: Sae Murase
- Team BII: Hono Akazawa, Konomi Kusaka, Rikako Kobayashi, Kanako Muro
- Kenkyūsei: Chihiro Kawakami, Nagisa Shibuya, Momoka Hayashi

=== "Jikan wa Katari Hajimeru" ===
- Team N: Narumi Koga
- Team M: Yuki Azuma, Arisa Koyanagi
- Team BII: Akari Ishizuka, Mako Umehara, Hazuki Kurokawa, Saki Kono, Tsubasa Yamauchi

== Charts ==
Chart (2013)	Peak position
Billboard Japan Hot 100	1

=== Oricon charts ===
Release	Oricon Singles Chart	Peak position	Debut sales (copies)	Sales total (copies)
October 2, 2013	Daily Chart	1	270,447	454,044
October 2, 2013	Weekly Chart	1	374,644	454,044
October 2, 2013	Monthly Chart	2	395,382	454,044
