= Pick It Up (Kis-My-Ft2 song) =

Single by Kis-My-Ft2

from the album Yummy!!
- B-side: "Up & down and up & down, yo dance!"; "All Around The World"; "Zukkyun!"
- Released: June 7, 2017 (Japan)
- Genre: J-pop
- Length: 3:36
- Label: Avex Trax

Kis-My-Ft2 singles chronology
"Inter" (2017)	"Pick It Up" (2017)	"Akai Kajitsu" (2017)

Music video
- "Pick It Up" on YouTube

"Pick It Up" (ピックイットアップ) is Japanese boy band Kis-My-Ft2's 19th single, released on June 7, 2017 by Avex Trax.

== Background ==
The theme of the single is "Cool & Sexy." It features a stylish dance sound that differs from "Tonight" and "Explode", both released in the same year, which were based on a "Cool & Sexy" concept.

"Pick It Up" was used as the theme song for the Fuji TV drama Sakurako-san no Ashimoto ni wa Shitai ga Umatteiru, starring Taisuke Fujigaya. The song reflects the worldview of the series, which revolves around uncovering facts from the bones—symbolized by the phrase “Pick It Up.” The music video (MV) includes skeletal imagery, and the choreography incorporates “picking up and pulling” movements, matching the bone-inspired costume designs.

During the performance, the members pull on parts of their costumes and perform dance moves resembling marionettes being controlled by strings or with joints fixed in place, while the seven members continuously shift formations throughout the routine.

== Chart performance ==
According to the Billboard Japan chart, the album sold 164,000 copies in its first week of release, ranking No. 1 overall on the Billboard Japan Hot 100. It also ranked 33rd on the Top Singles Sales annual chart. In the Oricon Weekly Singles Chart dated June 19, 2017, it sold 174,000 copies in its first week of release, making it their 19th consecutive album to reach the top position since their debut.

== Package specifications ==
It was released in three forms:

- First edition A (AVCD-83886/B)
- First edition B (AVCD-83887/B)
- Regular edition (AVCD-83888)

The CD was released on June 7, 2017. The jacket photo for this album also has a bone-like design along with the drama.

The CD was released in three formats, First edition A/B and Regular editions, each with a different coupling song and bonus video, and the DVD included with the limited first-run A includes a music video and a making-of video.

The DVD included in the First edition A includes the music video and a making-of video, while the DVD included in the First edition B includes a dance version of the song with multiple angles of the members and a "Pick It Up" related game. The serial movie can be viewed on the first bonus of the standard edition.

The coupling song "All Around The World" included in the limited first edition B is the theme song for "Moshi Mo Tours", and the song "Zukkyun" included in the Regular edition is the commercial song for the Unacool series by Kowa.

== Track listing ==
=== CD ===
- Normal Edition
1. "Pick it up" (3:36)
2. "Zukkyun" (3:45)
3. "Pick it up" (Jazzy Step ver.) (3:33)
- Limited First Edition A
1. "Pick it up"
2. "Up & down and up & down, yo dance!"
- Limited First Edition B
1. "Pick it up"
2. "All Around The World" (3:15)

=== DVD ===
- Limited First Edition A
1. "Pick it up" Music Video
2. "Pick it up" Music Video making document
- Limited First Edition B
1. "Pick it up" Music Video (Dance Edition multi-angle)
2. Kis-My-Tv (Kis-My-Ft2 pick you up!)
