= My Resistance (Tashika na Mono)/Unmei Girl =

Single by Kis-My-Ft2

from the album Good Ikuze!
- B-side: "Forever with U"
- Released: February 13, 2013 (Japan)
- Genre: J-pop
- Label: Avex Trax

Kis-My-Ft2 singles chronology
"Ai no Beat" (2012)	"My Resistance (Tashika na Mono)/Unmei Girl" (2013)	"Kiss U Mai (Kiss Your Mind) / S.O.S. (Smile on Smile)" (2013)

Music video
- "My Resistance (Tashika na Mono)" on YouTube "Unmei Girl" on YouTube

"My Resistance (Tashika na Mono)/Unmei Girl" (My Resistance -タシカナモノ-/運命Girl) is the 6th single by Japanese boy band Kis-My-Ft2. It was released on February 13, 2013.

"My Resistance (Tashika na Mono)" was the theme song for the television series A Chef of Nobunaga starring Yuta Tamamori.

The music video for this song features the members dancing in the rain. The filming took place in cold temperatures of 0 degrees Celsius, and the members danced for nearly an hour while being drenched in two tons of water. Tamamori said, "This is a work I will never forget."

"Unmei Girl" was the theme song for a Seven & I Holdings commercial in which Kis-My-Ft2 member appeared. This song was Seven & I Holdings "Valentine Fair" commercial song featuring Kis-My-Ft2.

== Chart performance ==
It debuted in number one on the weekly Oricon Singles Chart and reached number one on the Billboard Japan Hot 100. It was the 16th best-selling single in Japan in 2013, with 377,055 copies.

== Track listing ==
=== CD ===
- Regular Edition, First Edition A, Kis-My-Ft2 Shop Edition
1. "My Resistance (Tashika na Mono)" (4:56)
2. "Unmei Girl" (4:11)
3. "Forever with U" (4:20)
- Limited First Edition B, Seven & i Limited Edition
1. "Unmei Girl"
2. "My Resistance (Tashika na Mono)"

=== DVD ===
- Limited First Edition A
1. "My Resistance (Tashika na Mono)" (Music video)
2. "My Resistance (Tashika na Mono)" (Music video Making Movie)
- Limited First Edition B
1. "Unmei Girl" (Music video)
2. "Unmei Girl" (Music video Making Movie)
- Seven & i Limited Edition
1. Seven & i "Valentine Fair" CM Video
2. Seven & i "Valentine Fair" CM footage Making Movie
3. Valentine's Day Special Movie (each member's own "Valentine's Day" situation)
