= Kiss U Mai (Kiss Your Mind) / S.O.S. (Smile on Smile) =

Single by Kis-My-Ft2

from the album Hit! Hit! Hit!
- B-side: "Keep on Smiling"
- Released: March 27, 2013 (Japan)
- Genre: J-pop
- Label: Avex Trax

Kis-My-Ft2 singles chronology
"My Resistance (Something that can't be helped)/Fate Girl" (2013)	"Kiss U Mai (Kiss Your Mind) / S.O.S. (Smile on Smile)" (2013)	"Kimi to no Kiseki" (2013)

Music video
- "Kiss U Mai (Kiss your mind)" on YouTube "S.O.S. (Smile on Smile)" on YouTube

"Kiss U Mai (Kiss Your Mind) / S.O.S. (Smile on Smile)" (キ・ス・ウ・マ・イ 〜KISS YOUR MIND〜/S.O.S (Smile On Smile)) is the 7th single by Japanese boy band Kis-My-Ft2. It was released on March 27, 2013.

"Kiss U Mai (Kiss your mind)" was a commercial song of glico chewing gum "Watering kiss mint gum". This chewing gum commercial was based on the concept of "Member of Kis-My-Ft2 are good at kiss" (Note: "Umai" means "good at" in Japanese. Since Kis-My-Ft2 is affectionately called "Kisumai," the words "Kisumai," "Kiss," and "Umai" were combined to form the commercial "Kis-My-Ft2 is good at kissing".) and featured the expressions of the members as they kissed. In the music video, women wearing decorations that resemble lips dance, and flames appear to burst into flames when the members kiss.

"S.O.S. (Smile on Smile)" was also a commercial song for DHC Corporation "Medicated Acne Control Series" featuring Kis-My-Ft2. The song is fast and refreshing, with roller skates as the trademark of Kis-My-Ft2, and the music video uses a conveyor belt for the production.

== Chart performance ==
It debuted in number one on the weekly Oricon Singles Chart and reached number one on the Billboard Japan Hot 100. It was the 27th best-selling single in Japan in 2013, with 262,737 copies.

== Track listing ==
=== CD ===
- Normal Edition, Limited First Edition (Kiss your mind edition)
1. "Kiss U Mai (Kiss your mind)" [4:12]
2. "S.O.S. (Smile on Smile)"[4:10]
3. "Keep on Smile" [3:55] (Only in regular edition)
  - Fuji Television's “Moshi Mo Tours” theme song
- Limited first pressing [S.O.S. disc
1. "S.O.S. (Smile on Smile)"
2. "Kiss U Mai (Kiss your mind)"

=== DVD ===
- Limited First Edition (Kiss your mind edition)
1. "Kiss U Mai (Kiss your mind)" MV [Story version]
2. "Kiss U Mai (Kiss your mind)" MV [Dance version]
3. "Kiss U Mai (Kiss your mind)" MV [Making Movie]
4. glico “Watering KISSMINT” CM [Making Movie]
- First production limited edition [S.O.S disc]
1. S.O.S. (Smile on Smile) MV
2. S.O.S. (Smile on Smile) MV [Making Movie]
3. DHC “Medicated Acne Control Series” CM
4. DHC “Medicated Acne Control Series” CM [Making Movie]
