= Kis-My-World =

Studio album by Kis-My-Ft2
- Released: July 1, 2015
- Genre: J-pop
- Length: 69:02 (regular edition)
- Label: Avex Trax

Kis-My-Ft2 chronology
Kis-My-Journey (2014)	Kis-My-World (2015)	I Scream (2016)

Singles from Kis-My-World
- 1. "Another Future" Released: August 13, 2014; 2. "Thank You Jan!" Released: December 24, 2014; 3. "Kiss Damashii" Released: March 25, 2015

Music video
- "Brand New World" on YouTube

'Kis-My-World' Kis-My-World (キスマイワールド) is the fourth studio album by Japanese boy band Kis-My-Ft2. It was released on July 1, 2015, under the record label Avex Trax.

== Overview ==
Kis-My-World is Kis-My-Ft2's fourth original album, released on July 1, 2015.

It features the hit song "Thank you!" and six other hit singles and tie-in songs, including "Kiss Damashii" and "Another Future," the theme song for the television series A Chef of Nobunaga starring Yuta Tamamori, as well as duo songs by Hiromitsu Kitayama and Taisuke Fujigaya, Yuta Tamamori and Toshiya Miyata, Takashi Nikaido and Kento Senga, and Wataru Yokoo and Taisuke Fujigaya.

Also included Kis-My-Ft2's first live album (First edition A), which includes everything from their debut song to their 10th single, as well as a collection of their most recent remixes (First edition B), which includes their most popular songs along with their best-known songs.

According to critic Toshihiro Yano, Kis-My-Ft2's music had previously been considered to be mostly dance music, but with this album the musical direction was almost unified into disco, funk, and Electronic dance music.

Their concert tour "2015 Concert Tour "Kis-My-World"" was held with this album from August 29 to September 20.

== Promotion ==
From June 23 to 29, a wrapping building "Kis-My-Gallery" appeared in Omotesando, Tokyo to celebrate the release of this album. The gallery space on the first floor of the building was used to exhibit the album package and special videos, while the second floor was used to accept reservations for the album. On the first day of the opening, Kis-My-Ft2 made a surprise visit and left a handwritten message on the first floor wall.

== Commercial performance ==
The album sold 300,000 copies in its first week, reaching No. 1 on the Oricon Weekly Albums Chart dated July 13, 2015. It was her highest album sales and their fifth consecutive album at the top spot since their debut. The album also topped the Billboard Japan Hot Albums.

== Package specifications ==
It was released in five different editions:

- First edition A (AVCD-93171/B)
- First edition B (AVCD-93172/B)
- Regular edition (AVCD-93173)
- Kis-My Shop edition (AVZ1-93174)
- Seven & I edition

The first edition A includes a DVD/Blu-ray 2014 Concert Tour 'Kis-My-Journey', which is their first live album with live soundtracks from the tour.

The first edition B contained the first remix of a popular song that was not included on the album, and the remixes on the B disc were performed by a team of gorgeous creators and became a hot topic of conversation among music fans.

== Track listing ==
=== CD ===
1. "4th Overture" [1:43]
2. "Brand New World" [4:09]
3. "Kiss damashii" [4:04]
4. "Another Future" [3:55]
5. "Follow" [3:30]
6. "Kimi ni aete kara" [4:51] (Because I can see you)
7. "if" [4:52]
8. "Wandafour" [3:24] - Wataru Yokoo, Taisuke Fujigaya
9. "Be Love" [4:00] - Yuta Tamamori, Toshiya Miyata
10. "Akashi" [5:00] - Hiromitsu Kitayama, Taisuke Fujigaya
11. "Shake Body!" [3:20] (arr: Shinjiro Inoue)
12. "Perfect World" [4:19]
13. "Thank you!" [4:46]
14. "Kiss & Peace" [4:39]
15. "Dokidoki de YEEEAAAAAHHHH!" [4:05] (regular edition only)
16. "Halley" [4:05] (arr. by SIXMAN) (regular edition only)

=== Bonus CD ===
==== First Edition A ====
- "2014 Concert Tour 'Kis-My-Journey' LIVE CD
1. "3rd Overture"
2. "Everybody Go"
3. "WANNA BEEEE!!!!"
4. "SHE! HER! HER!"
5. "Seven Journey"
6. "Luv Sick"
7. "Daisukidesu"
8. "KISS U MA I: Kiss Your Mind"
9. "Fire!! "- Hiromitsu Kitayama, Taisuke Fujigaya
10. "Unmei Girl"
11. "My Resistance -Tashikanamono"
12. "Snow Dome no Yakusoku"
13. "Aino Beat"
14. "Shake It Up"
15. "Kis-My-Calling!"
16. "Fire Beat"
17. "Take Over"
18. "Hikari no Signal"
19. "Bokura no Yakusoku"
20. "We never give up!"
21. "Kimi to no Kiseki"
22. "Tana Kara Botamochi" song by Busaiku
23. "Good-bye, Thank you"

==== First Edition B Remix CD ====
1. "Everybody Go" (Remix by Taku Takahashi)
2. "SHE! HER! HER!" (Remix by Watagumi Band)
3. "Take Over" (Remix by DJ Watarai)
4. "Tell me why" (Remix by TeddyLoid)
5. "Unmei Girl" (Remix by banvox)
6. "Black & White" (Remix by DJ Hasebe)
7. "Eternal Mind" (Remix by DJ'Tekina//Something)
8. "Kimi to no Kiseki" (Remix by FPM)
9. "Tanagokoro" (Remix by Jazzin'park)
10. "Daisukidesu" (Remix by Daishi Dance)
11. "Fire Beat" (Remix by DJ Fumi*Yeah!)
12. "Inori" (Remix by PandaBoY)
13. "Rain" -Remix by Avec Avec(Sugar's Campaign)-

=== DVD ===
==== First Edition A ====
1. "Brand New World" - MV
2. "Brand New World" - Members' Choreography Lecture
3. Recording document of 4 units
4. Special bonus video -Kiss My Mission!

==== First Edition B ====
1. "Brand New World" - MV (7 members solo version)
2. Music Video & Jacket shooting making-of document
3. Digest of Busaiku & Kis-My-Ft2 release event
4. "Sakura Hirari" performed at the event is also included.
5. Release event Osaka & Tokyo close making-of document
6. Special bonus video - Kis-my Emergency Summit
7. Special bonus video - Kis-my Challenge!

==== Kiss My Shop Edition ====
1. Special bonus footage DVD of each member's solo
2. Recording of the album
3. Fixed-point camera question corner full of real faces
4. Private Clothes Fashion Check Corner
5. One-minute solo world
6. Message to fans
7. Rare bonus footage that could not be included in the special bonus video
