= I Scream (Kis-My-Ft2 album) =

Studio album by Kis-My-Ft2
- Released: June 22, 2016
- Genre: J-pop
- Length: 66:40
- Label: Avex Trax

Kis-My-Ft2 chronology
Kis-My-World (2015)	I Scream (2016)	Music Colosseum (2017)

Singles from Kis-My-World
- 1. "AAO (song)" Released: October 21, 2015; 2. "Saigo mo Yappari Kimi" Released: November 11, 2015; 3. "Gravity (Kis-My-Ft2 song)" Released: March 16, 2016

Music video
- Yes! I Scream on YouTube

I Scream (アイスクリーム) is the fifth studio album by Japanese boy band Kis-My-Ft2, released on June 22, 2016 by avex trax.

== Overview ==
On this album they presented for the first time seven solo songs. These solo songs were self-produced by them and are included in the "Limited Edition 4cups Version." The solo songs by Kento Senga, Toshiya Miyata, Wataru Yokoo, Yuta Tamamori and Takashi Nikaido were also produced with unique music videos. Hiromitsu Kitayama and Taisuke Fujigaya, "two of Kis-My-Ft2's original singers", produced the music video for their duo song "Fire!" from "Kis-My-Journey".

The "Limited Edition 2cups Version" comes with a DVD containing the music video for the lead song "Yes! I Scream" The bonus DVD includes "Kis-My-TV: Kiss My Share House," in which the seven members spent the night together in a rented mansion in Okinawa and talked about their true feelings.

The bonus track "Wanted" is included in the regular edition. In addition, a bonus CD containing "Kis-My-Ft2 Non-Stop Mix -Vol.1-," a collection of single hits and classic songs from the Jr. era that trace the group's history to date, is included.

The song "Re:", which is included in all formats, is the first song in which all seven members took on the challenge of writing lyrics together.

With this song, they held a concert tour Kis-My-Ft2 Concert Tour 2016 I Scream from July 1 to August 14.

== Chart performance ==
It recorded first-week sales of 244,000 copies and reached No. 1 on the Oricon Weekly Albums Chart for the week of July 4, 2016. This was their sixth consecutive album to reach the top spot on the chart since their first album Kis-My-1st. It became the third group in history to surpass 200,000 first-week sales for six consecutive albums since their first album, following KinKi Kids (12 consecutive albums) and Hikaru Utada (7 consecutive albums). The album also topped Billboard Japan Top Albums Sales. By December 2016, it had sold a total of 281,433 copies and ranked 12th on the 2016 annual Oricon Albums Chart.

== Package specifications ==
It was released in three formats:

- Limited Edition 4cups Version (AVCD93450/B/C/D) 2CD & 2DVD
- Limited Edition 2cups Version (AVCD93451/B) CD & DVD
- Regular Edition (AVCD93452/B) 2CD

== Track listing ==
=== CD ===
1. "5th Overture" [1:55] (inst.)
2. "Yes! I Scream" [4:34] (inst.)
3. "Summer Breeze" [4:16]
4. "Gravity" [4:16]
5. "Psycho" [3:59]
6. "& say" [3:25] - Hiromitsu Kitayama, Taisuke Fujigaya
7. "Flamingo" [3:27]
8. "Evening Sky" [4:46]
9. "Saigo mo Yappari Kimi" [5:05]
10. "AAO" [4:14]
11. "Mega Love" [4:25]
12. "MU-CHU-DE Koishiteru" [4:35]
13. "Novel -Album ver.-" [4:54]
14. "Re:" [4:51]
15. "I Scream Night" [4:12]
16. "Wanted" [3:46]

==== Bonus CD ====
- Limited 4cups version
1. "What are you thinking about now?" [3:31] - Hiromitsu Kitayama :Words and music by HusiQ.K, arrangement by KASUMI (COZMIC CODE) / SOU (COZMIC CODE)
2. "Get ready" [4:20] - Kento Senga Lyrics by Komei Kobayashi, music composed by Fredrik “Figge” Bostrom, MiNE, Atsushi Shimada, arranged by Atsushi Shimada :The music video was shot using a drone in a resort-like setting by the ocean in Los Angeles. The music video also featured a collaboration with s**t kingz . He created all the costumes himself, including shoes and accessories .
3. "Otaku Dattatte It's All Right!" [4:25] - Toshiya Miyata :The theme of this song is “Otaku Miyata's Road to Love Master. The music video is a CG love game-like production, featuring Tekken's parapara manga and “wotagei” dance scenes, as Miyata raises his love level after a string of heartbreak.
4. "Watter bento" [3:14] - Wataru Yokoo :In the music video, Wataru Yokoo's idea was to put ingredients of the members' colors in their bento boxes, and filmed them actually cooking in their cook's outfit . In the interlude, “Kento, the chef” (played by Kento Senga), who claims to be a chef dancer, appears.
5. "You're liar" [4:06] - Taisuke Fujigaya :This song was born from Fujigaya's idea to try a song that fuses classical music within the song .
6. "Alive" [4:05] - Yuta Tamamori :With an EDM sound, the theme of the music video is “White World". For the first time, she tries on a white wig and colored contacts to unify her world view as a person different from herself.
7. "Jossy Matsumura's Scream" [3:02] - Takashi Nikaido :This cheerleading song depicts a school youth love comedy in which “Jossy Matsumura,” a dark girl who is a fan of Tamamori, trains in cheerleading in order to win the heart of a boy she has fallen in love with at first sight. In the music video, Jossy Matsumura is Nikaido dressed as a woman, with Tamamori as the love-at-first-sight and Senga as Tamamori's girlfriend.
- Regular Edition only
- "Kis-My-Ft2 non-Stop Mix -Vol.1-"
1. "Everybody Go"
2. "She! Her! Her!"
3. "Aino beat: Dance ver."
4. "Shake It Up"
5. "Kiss Damashii"
6. "Eternal mind"
7. "Hair"
8. "Another Future"
9. "if"
10. "My Resistance (Tashikanamono)"
11. "Hikarino signal"
12. "Daisuki desu"
13. "Snow Dome no Yakusoku"
14. "Sakura Hirari"
15. "Smile"
16. "S.O.S (Smile On Smile)"
17. "Tell Me Why"
18. "Luv Sick"
19. "Wanna beeee!!!!"
20. "Unmei girl"
21. "Kiss U My Mind"
22. "Brand New Season"
23. "Kis-My-LAND"
24. "My Love"
25. "Kimi Tono Kiseki"
26. "We never give up!"
27. "3D Girl"
28. "Fire beat"
29. "Kis-My-Calling!"
30. "Thank you!"

=== DVD ===
- Limited 4cups Edition
- Disc 1
1. "Fire!!!" (Music Video) - Hiromitsu Kitayama, Taisuke Fujigaya
2. "Get Ready" (Music Video)- Kentaga Senga
3. "Otaku Dattatte It's Alright!"
4. "Watter Bento" (Music Video)- Wataru Yokoo
5. "Alive" (Music Video)- Yuta Tamamori
6. "Jossy Matsumura's Scream" (Music Video)- Takashi Nikaido
7. "Re:" (Solo angle Movie)
  - Hiromitsu Kitayama / Kennaga Senga / Toshiya Miyata / Wataru Yokoo / Taisuke Fujigaya / Yuta Tamamori / Takatsugu Nikaido
- Disc 2
1. Kis-My-Ft2 x Self-produced project "6movies" Close-up Documentary
2. Documentary of the production of "Re:" with lyrics written by the members
- Limited 2cups version
1. Yes! I Scream (Music Video)
2. Yes! I Scream (Making Movie)
3. Kis-My-TV: (Kis-My-Sharehouse)
