= Omoibana =

Single by Kis-My-Ft2

from the album Synopsis
- B-side: "Rebirth Stage"; "Tokyo-Kis" (Regular edition); "You know what?" (Regular edition)
- Released: December 14, 2022 (Japan)
- Genre: J-pop
- Length: 4:15
- Label: MENT Recording

Kis-My-Ft2 singles chronology
"Two as One" (2022)	"Omoibana" (2022)	"Tomoni" (2023)

Music video
- "Omoibana" on YouTube "Rebirth Stage" on YouTube

"Omoibana" (Japanese: 想花, Hepburn: Omoibana) is the 30th single CD by Japanese boy band Kis-My-Ft2. It was released on December 14, 2022, under the record label MENT Recording.

== Overview ==
The title song "Omoibana" is the theme song of Nippon TV's Saturday drama Patient Chart Prayer starring Yuta Tamamori, which tells the story of a rookie resident doctor's growth. The music video depicts people praying for the happiness of their loved ones, and Kis-My-Ft2 members watch over them.

The lyrics of "Omoibana" are linked to the story of the drama Patient Chart Prayer, depicting a wish to be saved by a being who accepts and stops everything in times of pain and anxiety, and to be the same way. The title "Omoibana (Wishful Flower)" contains the message, "Just as a flower blooms and falls, but the seeds that fall to the ground continue to bloom as the seasons come around again, I want to wish for the happiness of my loved ones forever". The music video was produced to express the gentle and warm world of this song by mixing drama scenes featuring not only the Kis-My-Ft2 members but also actors. The drama depicts people wishing for the happiness of their loved ones despite their various worries and conflicts. The song received more than 10 million YouTube music video views before its release. This was the first time since Luv Bias was released in February 2021.

The coupling song "Rebirth Stage" is the ending theme song of TV Tokyo's drama Married Couple's Perfect Recipe: Won't You Exchange?(夫婦円満レシピ) appeared Kento Senga. This drama is about the shocking and exciting experiences of a couple going through a period of malaise. Senga said that this song is an unconventional piece of work that fits the drama. "Rebirth Stage" is a hip-hop song spun with lyrics that have two meanings: "Rebirth" in the sense of being born anew and "Rebirth" in the sense of reversal, meaning that the experience of diving into a turning point makes one bolder. The music video is an aggressive and unique music video that shows a new side of Kis-My-Ft2 under the theme of "break out of your shell and be reborn".

== Chart performance ==
It recorded first-week sales of 243,000 copies and topped the Oricon Weekly Singles Chart on December 26, 2022. This was their 30th consecutive top position on the chart since their first single "Everybody Go", and it also broke the tie for third place in the number of consecutive No. 1 singles since their debut (first single).

== Track listing ==
=== CD ===
Included only in regular editions after "Tokyo-Kis".

1. "Omoibana" (4:15)
2. "Rebirth Stage" (2:58)
3. "Tokyo-Kis" (3:04), (regular editions only)
4. "You know what?" (3:15), (regular editions only)
5. "Omoibana (Instrumental)", (regular editions only)
6. "Rebirth Stage (Instrumental)", (regular editions only)
7. "Tokyo-Kis (Instrumental)", (regular editions only)
8. "You know what? (Instrumental)", (regular editions only)

=== DVD ===
- First Edition A
1. "Omoibana Music Video"
2. "Omoibana Music Video & Jacket Filming Making Documentary"
3. "Rebirth Stage Music Video Filming Making Documentary"
- First Edition B
1. "Rebirth Stage Music Video"
2. Reveal it with your medical records! Sekirara medical checkup & Cyber climbing showdown!
- Regular Edition (with Fan Club Limited edition)
1. "Omoibana Music Video member only edit"
2. "Omoibana 1cut ver."
