= Tomoni =

Single by Kis-My-Ft2
- Released: August 3, 2023 (Japan)
- Genre: J-pop
- Label: MENT Recording

Kis-My-Ft2 singles chronology
"Omoibana" (2022)	"Tomoni" (2023)	"Heartbreaker / C'monova" (2024)

Music video
- "Tomoni" on YouTube

"Tomoni" (ともに) is a special single by Kis-My-Ft2 and the last work by the seven membered, released exclusively through "xxxxx.pop up store" (Note: The store name was changed to "xxxxx.pop-up store" in 2023 and then again to "famikura store" on July 29, 2024. following the closure of Johnny & Associates. It sells official merchandise from Starto Entertainment's artists and groups.) on August 3, 2023.

The title song "Tomoni" was written by all the members when Hiromitsu Kitayama announced his graduation.

Yuta Tamamori, another member of the group, commented on the creation of the song, "The seven of us discussed and decided on everything together, including the song title and the song title. Among the various ideas we had, we decided to use Wataru Yokoo's idea of "Tomoni" as the title of the song. The title "Tomoni" has two meanings in Japanese: "to be together" and "to be friends".

The DVD and Blu-ray editions of the single include the music video for “Tomoni,” which features documentary-style footage of the song’s production process as well as the members’ candid thoughts and expressions. In the music video, the group visits several places associated with their history, including Yoyogi National Gymnasium, where their debut was announced; Yebisu Garden Place, where they held an event on their debut day; and the rooftop of the Tokyo Dome Hotel, where they performed their then-new song “Endless Summer” as an encore during the live broadcast of Kis-My-Ft2 Live Tour 2020 To-y2, held on October 4, 2020. The jacket photograph was taken in front of Yoyogi National Gymnasium, and the new profile photograph was taken on the rooftop of the Tokyo Dome Hotel in the morning sunlight.

The single was sold for a limited time exclusively through the official online shop and was not released for general retail sale or included on any album.

== Track listing ==
There were two editions were released. DVD and Blu-ray versions have the same content.

- CD with DVD (JWC1-63892/B)
- CD with Blu-ray (JWC1-63893/B)

=== CD ===
1. "Tomoni"
2. "Tomoni (Instrumental)"

=== DVD/Blu-ray ===
1. "Tomoni (Music video and documentary)"
