= Nice Flight! =

- Genre: Romantic drama
- Written by: Rin Etoh
- Directed by: Tadaaki Hourai, Kento Kiuchi
- Starring: Yuta Tamamori
- Music by: Kan Sawada
- Opening theme: "Two as One" by Kis-My-Ft2
- Country of origin: Japan
- Original language: Japanese
- No. of episodes: 8

Production
- Producers: Akiko Emii Kanda, Mayuko Tanaka, Kazuki Mori
- Running time: 60min.
- Production companies: TV Asahi, Media Mix Japan Co., Ltd.

Original release
- Network: TV Asahi
- Release: July 22 – September 9, 2022

Related
- "Nice Control!"

Nice Flight! is a Japanese television drama that aired 11:15pm to 12:15am from 22 July to 9 September 2022 in the "Friday night drama" slot on TV Asahi. It starred Yuta Tamamori.

With the full cooperation of Japan Airlines (JAL), the film depicts the reality of aircraft pilots, mechanics and other airport workers. The film was shot using JAL's own equipment, with acting instruction provided by a current pilot, at JAL facilities at Haneda Airport and other locations. For the air traffic controllers, the staff actually interviewed Ministry of Land, Infrastructure, Transport and Tourism and wrote the script.

== Background ==
Due to the spread of COVID-19 from 2020, the Japanese government issued "declaration of a state of emergency" to its citizens four times. This restricted the people from going out and traveling freely, and the economy, especially the airline industry, was severely impacted. Restrictions were gradually eased as the outbreak subsided, however, the "semi-state of emergency COVID-19 measures" were in effect until March 2022. and even in July 2022, when the drama began airing, it could not be said that free travel and outings had yet resumed. The drama was produced to boost the aviation industry, which had been depressed by COVID-19.

The drama received the "13th Location Japan Special Award" for its contribution to the recovery of the aviation industry, which had been depressed by COVID-19. At that award ceremony, Tadaaki Horai, director of the drama, said, "I created this drama to deliver the message of believing in a brighter future through a drama set in the sky because of the period of time when we could not fly freely in the sky due to COVID-19". Japan Airlines Vice President Shinichiro Shimizu said, "We must get out of the depression. Thanks to this drama, people involved in aviation and airports have been cheered up. I hope the drama made viewers want to travel again." He said.

== Promotion ==
In conjunction with the broadcast of the drama, Japan Airlines conducted promotional activities. In addition to an interview with Yuta Tamamori, who plays the lead role, a dialogue with a current aircraft pilot in command was featured, and a dance video of the cast performing "Two as One" was aired on Japan Airlines's official YouTube site and TikTok. Four commercials featuring Yuta Tamamori as an aircraft pilot calling for Japan Airlines travel were also aired.

== Synopsis ==
Sui Kurata (Yuta Tamamori) is a young aircraft pilot who has been promoted to co-pilot after a rigorous training period. He has a kind and caring personality that cannot leave anyone in trouble. For some reason, he gets into trouble when he flies with others, which has earned him the nickname 'The lucky co-pilot (sarcastically) '. One day, during a flight, Sui and Pilot in command Kitami were forced to deal with bad weather, but thanks to the calm and smart guidance of a female air traffic controller, they succeeded in landing safely at Haneda Airport. Sui falls in love with the voice of the woman and wants to meet the owner of the voice. On the other hand, the owner of the voice, Mayu Shibuya (Anne Nakamura), a female air traffic controller at Haneda Airport, is a calm and excellent air traffic controller, but in her private life she is not like a woman at all, and is unsociable and clumsy. While both give their all to their work, the two adults meet and fall in love with each other.

== Cast ==
Sui Kurata (Yuta Tamamori)
Protagonist. Co-pilot of Japan Airlines. Popular with flight attendant. He is looking for a female air traffic controller he fell in love with when he heard her voice.
Mayu Shibuya (Anne Nakamura)
Heroine. Cool but unfriendly air traffic controller working at Haneda Airport. She was transferred from her hometown Aomori Airport in Aomori.
Nami Kitami (Michiko Kichise)
Pilot in command. She has a husband and a daughter.
Kasumi Kawahara (Tina Tamashiro)
Air traffic controller. She longs for the glamorous life and originally aspired to be a flight attendant. She feels that the job of air traffic controller is too plain and wants to fall in love with a pilot.
James Sakaki (Ukon Onoe)
Aircraft maintenance technician. Single father.
Rikako Iizuka (Tomoka Kurokawa)
Flight attendant. She and Mayu are from the same town and have known each other since high school.
Eito Okajima (Daichi Saeki)
Co-pilot, who is a classmate of SUI, paired with SUI during the transition training from the 767 to the 787.
Enomoto (Toshiya Miyata) (Note: Special appearance in the final episode only.)
Flight attendant. He and his colleague were in the corridor at Haneda Airport when they passed Sui on his way to On-the-job training flight and exchanged a few words.

== Staff ==
- Screenplay - Rin Etoh
- Music - Kan Sawada
- Theme song - 'Two as One' by Kis-My-Ft2 (MENT Recording)
- Weather supervisor - Ameri Suzuki
- General producer - Shinko Nakagawa (TV Asahi)
- Producers - Akiko Emii Kanda (TV Asahi), Mayuko Tanaka (TV Asahi), Kazuki Mori (Media Mix Japan Co., Ltd.)
- Cooperation - Japan Airlines
- Direction - Tadaaki Hourai, Kento Kiuchi
- Production credits - TV Asahi, Media Mix Japan Co., Ltd.

== Broadcast Schedule ==
	Date	Subtitle	Director
#1	22 July 2022	The lucky co-pilot is here	Tadaaki Hourai
#2	29 July 2022	Fateful reunion at boarding training.	Tadaaki Hourai
#3	5 August 2022	When he discovers the "owner of the voice" he has been looking for!	Kento Kiuchi
#4	12 August 2022	The sea in the middle of summer! A morning alone with just the two of us at camp!	Kento Kiuchi
#5	19 August 2022	The promise of a fireworks flight! The moment to express your feelings!	Tadaaki Hourai
#6	26 August 2022	Fate to fall in love with a pilot? New training begins!	Kento Kiuchi
#7	2 September 2022	Final chapter! Two people who, because they love each other... cross paths!	Tadaaki Hourai
#8	9 September 2022	Final Episode!!! A take-off on love and miracles	Tadaaki Hourai

== Award ==
13th Location Japan Awards (Special Award)
Along with the drama Nice Flight!, Japan Air Lines and Ministry of Land, Infrastructure, Transport and Tourism both received awards.

== Nice Control! ==
A spin-off drama titled "Nice Control!", featuring air traffic controller Yukihiro Natsume, played by Ryohei Abe (Snow Man), was exclusively distributed on Telasa. It depicts the growth of the two with air traffic controller Kawahara Kasumi, played by Tina Tamashiro.

=== Cast (spin-off drama) ===
- Natsume Yukihiro - Ryohei Abe (Snow Man)
- Kasumi Kawahara - Tina Tamashiro

=== Staff (spin-off drama) ===
- Screenplay - Keisuke Fukutani
- Director - Ken Higure
- General Producer - Shinko Nakagawa
- Producers - Akiko Emii Kanda, Maiko Kobayashi, Kazuki Mori
- Production - TV Asahi, MMJ

=== Streaming Schedule ===
1. 20 August 2022
2. 27 August 2022
3. 3 September 2022
