= &Joy =

2025 single by the Japanese boy band Kis-My-Ft2

Single by Kis-My-Ft2
- B-side: "A Cha Cha Cha"; "Luminar"; "Silence"
- Released: December 31, 2025
- Genre: J-pop
- Label: MENT Recording
- Composer: Yuichiro Tsuru
- Lyricist: Yuichiro Tsuru

Kis-My-Ft2 singles chronology
"Curtain Call" (2025)	"&Joy" (2025)

Music video
- "&Joy" on YouTube "A Cha Cha Cha" on YouTube

"&Joy" (pronounced Enjoy) is the 33rd single by Japanese boy band Kis-My-Ft2. The song was released on streaming and download services ahead of its physical CD release on December 31, 2025, and its music video was simultaneously made available on YouTube.

== Overview ==
The title song "&Joy" delivers an uplifting message, encouraging listeners to enjoy vibrant days together with Kis-My-Ft2 by finding and collecting small moments of joy and happiness, even when everyday life feels overwhelming. It is characterized by a bright, euphoric sound.

The music video reflects the song's colorful worldview, featuring an abstract space inspired by urban scenery. The members' natural smiles leave a strong impression, creating a cheerful and enjoyable video.

The choreography combines a mature coolness with playful pop elements designed to make both dancers and viewers feel uplifted. In particular, the catchy formation in which the members dance in a single line during the chorus is highlighted as a key point of interest. As 2026 marks the 15th anniversary of Kis-My-Ft2's debut, "&Joy" serves as a vibrant opening to a milestone year for the group.

=== Other songs ===
The coupling track "A Cha Cha Cha" was released on August 11, 2025, as the group's first digital single, and its music video was made available on YouTube on the same day.

The song is themed around "summer, adulthood, composure, and playfulness", and is built on a 1990s boom bap hip-hop sound, featuring catchy phrases and playful word choices that evoke a slightly mature summer atmosphere for Kis-My-Ft2.

The music video portrays scenes of the members enjoying themselves poolside with glamorous women, emphasizing the concept of a more adult summer song.

Included in the regular edition, "Luminar" is a dazzling track that captures those everyday moments when the heart tightens. It features melodies and harmonies that reflect Kis-My-Ft2's "present", wrapping listeners in a gentle, soft atmosphere—truly a Reiwa era winter ballad from the group.

"Silence" addresses modern issues such as social media and smartphone dependence, where people walking down the street seem expressionless and disconnected. The song poses the question: "In a world closed off as if under noise cancellation, what is it that truly matters?" It warns of the importance of genuinely sensing human relationships—through our eyes, ears, and words—and sheds light on the lack of real-world connection and communication in society today.

== Commercial performance ==
"&Joy" debuted at number one on the Oricon Weekly Singles Chart, released on January 7, 2026, with first-week sales of 91,082 copies. With this release, Kis-My-Ft2 achieved their 33rd consecutive number-one single since their debut single "Everybody Go" in August 2011, extending their own record and ranking third overall in chart history for consecutive number-one singles from debut. The group has also topped the singles chart for 16 consecutive years, from fiscal year 2011 through fiscal year 2026, becoming the sole second-place holder for the longest streak of annual number-one singles from debut.

On the Oricon Weekly Combined Singles Chart, announced on January 8, 2026, "&Joy" ranked first with 91,768 points, marking Kis-My-Ft2's 11th number-one combined single. As a result, the group achieved a double crown on the weekly Oricon music rankings.

The single also topped Billboard Japan's Top Singles Sales chart, released on January 7, 2026 (tracking period: December 29, 2025 – January 4, 2026), selling 94,748 copies in its first week. On the Billboard Japan Hot 100, "&Joy" debuted at number two, following Kenshi Yonezu's "Iris Out".

== Package specification ==
Four versions were released.

- Family club limited edition (JWC1-25142/B)
- First edition A (JWCD-25139/B)
- First edition B (JWCD-25140/B)
- Regular edition (JWCD-25141)

== Track listing ==
=== CD ===
- Included only on Regular edition after "Luminar"
1. "&Joy"
  - Lyrics & composed by Yuichiro Tsuru
2. "A Cha Cha Cha"
  - Lyrics & composed by katsuki.CF
3. "Luminar" (Regular edition only)
4. "Silence" (Regular edition only)
5. "&Joy -Instrumental-" (Regular edition only)
6. "A Cha Cha Cha -Instrumental-" (Regular edition only)
7. "Luminar" -Instrumental- (Regular edition only)
8. "Silence" -Instrumental- (Regular edition only)

=== DVD ===
- First Edition A
1. "&Joy" Music Video
2. "&Joy" Music Video & Jacket Filming Making Documentary
3. "A Cha Cha Cha" Music Video Filming Making Documentary
- First Edition B
1. "A Cha Cha Cha" Music Video
2. "Kis-My-Ft2 Affection Buffet
3. "&Joy" Music Video DANCEver.
- Family club limited edition
1. "Curtain Call" 2025.06.21@LaLa arena TOKYO-BAY form MAGFACT TOUR
2. "A Cha Cha Cha" 2025.08.10@YOKOHAMA ARENA form MAGFACT TOUR
3. "&Joy" Music Video LIP ver.

=== Bonus content ===
==== Video content ====
A limited-time serial code is included only in First Edition A, First Edition B, and the Regular Edition. One serial number allows access to one bonus video content.

- Kis-My-Ft2 LIVE TOUR 2025 MAGFACT opening-day backstage digest
- Kis-My-Ft2 LIVE TOUR 2025 MAGFACT tour rehearsal short documentary
- "&Joy! Air Hockey" – Round 1
- "&Joy! Air Hockey" – Round 2
- "&Joy! Air Hockey" – Round 3

==== Selfie photocards ====
- First Edition A (JWCD-25139/B) bonus
  - Two selfie photocards (Kento Senga and Toshiya Miyata; rounded corners)
- First Edition B (JWCD-25140/B) bonus
  - Two selfie photocards (Wataru Yokoo and Taisuke Fujigaya; rounded corners)
- Regular Edition (JWCD-25141) bonus
  - Two selfie photocards (Yuta Tamamori and Takashi Nikaido; rounded corners)
- Sleeve-case packaging, two selfie photocards

== Charts ==
Chart performance for "&Joy"
Chart (2026)	Peak position
Japan (Japan Hot 100)	2
Japan (Oricon)	1
Japan Combined Singles (Oricon)	1
