= Heartbreaker / C'monova =

"Heartbreaker/C'monova"

Single by Kis-My-Ft2

from the album Synopsis
- A-side: "Heartbreaker", "C'monova"
- B-side: "Jenga Love", "Asobini ikou yo" (Regular, First A edition), "Lemon Pie", "Sweet Melody" (For dear life edition)
- Released: January 3, 2024 (Japan)
- Genre: J-Pop
- Label: MENT Recording

Kis-My-Ft2 singles chronology
"Tomoni" (2023)	"Heartbreaker/C'monova" (2024)	"Curtain Call" (2025)

Music video
- "Heartbreaker" on YouTube "C'monova" on YouTube "Heartbreaker Band session" on YouTube "C'monova Band session" on YouTube

"Heartbreaker/C'monova" (ハートブレイカー/カモノバ) is the 31st single by Japanese boy band Kis-My-Ft2. It was released on January 3, 2024. It debuted in number one on the weekly Oricon Singles Chart.

This song was released for the first time after Hiromitsu Kitayama left last year and they became a six-member group.

== Overview ==
The lyrics of "Heartbreaker" describe the weakness, strength, and confusion of men who are tossed around by love, and if you listen to the song along with their expressions in the YouTube music video, the music video starts with the sound of rain, and then Tamamori is alone in the car crying. It is an impressive scene that makes you want to imagine many things about the story of this song. There is also a dance scene, but it is not a vigorous dance, but rather a dance that leaves impressive points in a loose choreography, which has a strong impact.

"C'monova" is a song with the message, "Come here, I'll show you the real show." The music video for "C'monova" has already been released, and while the members' all-black outfits and sunglasses give a sense of delinquency typical of Kis-My-Ft2, their stylish and dignified appearance in the scene is also very exciting. The six come out of the darkness into the lobby of a luxurious hotel, and as they remove their sunglasses, they start walking as if looking for someone, and a spectacular story unfolds, with mafia and supernatural powers popping up. The song "C'monova," which plays like a theme song to such a cinematic worldview, is a song that shows off their rich voices to the fullest. "C'monova" has two meanings: "Come on over" and "nova". The song invites the audience to “Come on!” and dive into the new world of Kis-My-Ft2. Coincidentally, in their debut song “Everybody Go,” they also vigorously took fans into the world of Kis-My-Ft2 with the words “Come on! I am sure there is much excitement in store for the new doors they have opened over the years.

Both “C'monova” and “Heartbreaker” have recorded 5 million views in the days since their music videos were released. Even before their release, the music videos have attracted the attention of fans and have lived up to their expectations.

== Commercial performance ==
It sold 201,000 copies in the first week and ranked No. 1 in the latest Oricon Weekly Singles Chart released on January 9.

This is the 31st consecutive No. 1 single since their debut single Everybody Go, and the number of consecutive No.1 singles since their debut (1st) single has been renewed from a tie for 3rd place to 3rd place on the all-time list.

== Package specification ==
Four versions were released .

- First edition A (JWCD-63897/B)
- First edition B (JWCD-63898/B)
- Regular edition (JWCD-63899/B)
- For dear life edition (JWC1-98600)

== Track listing ==
=== CD ===
- Regular edition and First edition A
- Included only on Regular edition after "Jenga Love".
1. "Heartbreaker" [3:20]
2. "C'monova" [3:08]
3. "Jenga Love" [3:42]
4. "Asobini ikou yo" (Let's go and play with me) [3:12]
5. "Heartbreaker (Instrumental)" (arr: Seo Hyojung)
6. "C'monova (Instrumental)"
7. "Jenga Love (Instrumental)"(arr. Seo Hyojung)
8. "Asobini ikou yo (Instrumental)"
- First edition B: Released as "C'monova/Heartbreaker"
1. "C'monova"
2. "Heartbreaker"
- For dear life edition
1. "Heartbreaker"
2. "C'monova"
3. "Lemon Pie (Live ver.)"
4. "Sweet Melody (Live ver.)"

=== DVD ===
- First edition A
1. "Heartbreaker" Music Video
2. "Heartbreaker" Music Video & Jacket Filming Making Documentary
3. "C'monova" Music Video Filming Making Documentary
- First edition B
1. "C'monova" Music Video
2. Let's decide who is the best basketball player in Kis-My-Ft2, named "Tamamori Cup".
- Normal Edition (Fan Club Special DVD)
1. "Heartbreaker" Dance Edit
