= Two as One (song) =

Single by Kis-My-Ft2

from the album Synopsis
- B-side: "Ribon" (First edition A), "Smokin' Hot" (First edition B), "Akumu" (Regular edition)
- Released: August 17, 2022 (Japan)
- Genre: J-pop
- Label: MENT Recording

Kis-My-Ft2 singles chronology
"Fear/So Blue" (2021)	"Two as One" (2022)	"Omoibana" (2022)

Music video
- "Two as One" on YouTube "Smokin' Hot" on YouTube "Ribon" (Recording Movie) on YouTube "Akumu" (Lyrics Video) on YouTube "Two as One" (Live) on YouTube

"Two as One" is Japanese boy band Kis-My-Ft2's 29th single, released on August 17, 2022, by MENT Recording.

== Overview ==
The release of this single was announced at on-stage banter of Kyocera Dome Osaka performance of the dome tour "Kis-My-Ft ni Aeru de Show 2022 in Dome" held on June 3, 2022. The meaning of the title is "2 persons as 1".

The title song is the theme song of TV Asahi's Friday night drama Nice Flight! starring Yuta Tamamori, and the coupling song "Ribbon" included in the first edition A is used for the Tokyo Interior Furniture commercial song, and the coupling song "Smokin' Hot" included in the first edition B is used for the Kowa "Unakowa Ace" commercial song.

The title track "Two as One" is a medium ballad love song. The lyrics express the realistic love life of working adults and the thought that there is a place for both of them with you, the precious you, and that they can overcome any future with you, the love of their lives, next to them. The music video for "Smokin' Hot," included on the first edition B, is a summery song sung by the Kis-My-Ft2 members who greet the morning with hangovers after a crazy night.

"Two as One" was performed for the first time on July 2, 2022 at Tokyo Dome of Kis-My-Ft ni Aeru de Show 2022 in Dome.

== Chart performance ==
With first-week sales of 246,000 copies, the band topped the Oricon Weekly Singles Chart on August 29, 2022. This is the 29th consecutive time that the band has topped the chart since their 1st single Everybody Go. With this achievement, the "number of consecutive No. 1 singles since its debut (1st)" was renewed from No. 5 to tie for No. 3 on the all-time list.

== Track listing ==
=== CD ===
- First Edition A
1. "Two as One"
2. "Ribbon" (4:31)
- First Edition B
1. "Two as One"
2. "Smokin' Hot" (4:19)
- Regular edition and fan club limited edition
  - Included only on the Regular editions after "Akumu".
1. "Two as One" (3:53)
2. "Akumu (Nightmare)" (3:59)
3. "Two as One (Instrumental)"
4. "Ribbon (Instrumental)"
5. "Smokin' Hot (Instrumental)"
6. "Akumu (Instrumental)"

=== DVD/Blu-ray ===
Blu-ray is only for fan club limited edition.

- First Edition A
1. "Two as One" Music Video
2. "Two as One" Music Video & Jacket Filming Making Documentary
3. "Ribbon" Recording movie
- First Edition B
1. "Smokin' Hot" Music Video
2. "Smokin' Hot" Music Video Filming Making Documentary
3. Get a new foot! Billicker game!
- Fanclub limited edition Live DVD "'Kis-My-Ft ni Aeru de Show 2022 Final at Sundome Fukui"
1. "Re:"
2. "A10tion"
3. "Everybody Go"
4. "She! Her! Her!"
5. "Kis-My-Calling!"
6. "Fear"
7. "One Kiss"
8. "Naked"
9. "Girl is mine"
10. "#1 Girl"
11. "Maharaja"
12. "Thank You Jan!"
13. On-stage banter
14. "Luv Bias"
15. "Snow Dome no Yakusoku"
16. "Kanjirumama ni Kagayaite"
17. "Fire Beat"
18. "Tonight"
19. "Eternal Mind"
20. Remix Medley
  1. "I Scream Night"
  2. "Kiss Damashii"
  3. "Aino Beat" (Dance ver.)
  4. "Pick It Up"
  5. "AAO"
  6. "Kiss u mai (Kiss Your Mind)"
  7. "I Scream Night"
21. "Ashioto"
22. "Good-bye, Thank you" (Encore)
- "Kis-My-Ft ni Aeru de Show 2022" Behind-the-Scenes Documentary

== Package specifications ==
- First edition A (CD & DVD) (JWCD-63819/B)
- First edition B (CD & DVD) (JWCD-63820/B)
- Regular Edition (JWCD-63821) CD only
