= Magfact =

Studio album by Kis-My-Ft2
- Released: May 21, 2025
- Genre: J-pop
- Length: 40:34 (Note: Regular edition)
- Label: MENT Recording

Kis-My-Ft2 chronology
Synopsis (2024)	Magfact (2025)

Singles from Magfact
- 1. "Curtain Call" Released: January 8, 2025

Music video
- "Glory days" on YouTube "Otsukaresama desu! feat. Sandwichman" on YouTube "Half Baked" on YouTube "Cheat 1cut Movie Show" on YouTube

Magfact (マグファクト) is the eleventh original album by Japanese boy band Kis-My-Ft2, released on May 21, 2025, by MENT Recording. To promote the album, the group will embark on a nationwide arena tour titled Kis-My-Ft2 Live Tour 2025 Magfact, running from June 21 to September 14, 2025.

== Overview ==
The album title, Magfact, is a coined word combining "magnet" (meaning the power to attract) and "fact" (truth), representing music born from connection. The title reflects the group’s intention to seek new possibilities through collaboration and self-renewal. The album would include ten tracks, eight of which are newly written.

The album cover art features a collage of the group members’photographs, designed to form a single unified artwork, reflecting the way the title "Magfact" combines seven letters to create meaning. The visual concept represents the connections and bonds implied in the album's title as a mysterious magnetic field, with the members depicted as if being drawn together by its invisible force.

The track "Glory Days", written and composed by Kamikaze Boy of the Japanese rock band Man with a Mission, was released in advance via streaming services on April 14, 2025, along with its official music video on YouTube.

Kamikaze Boy commented on "Glory Days", stating that he aimed to create a song that would "excite and offer emotional support" to listeners. The music video was filmed at an abandoned building, featuring a combination of vocal scenes in a mystical environment where nature and man-made structures coexist, and energetic dance performances. The members' costumes include wolf-fur inspired accents as a reference to Man with a Mission.

Another track, "Otsukaresama Desu!" (featuring Sandwichman), features guest vocals by Japanese comedy duo Sandwichman, who have had a long-standing friendship with the group. The song was released for streaming on April 21, 2025, accompanied by a music video on YouTube.

The music video for the song begins with the members of Kis-My-Ft2 dressed in business suits, portraying businessmen seated around a round table in a Chinese restaurant, engaging in a business meeting. The video comically depicts how everyday failures and workplace stress are "digested" through delicious food, accompanied by the commonly used Japanese workplace greeting "Otsukaresama desu! (お疲れ様です！)". The comedy duo Sandwichman also appears in the video, enjoying Chinese cuisine with great enthusiasm and performing a catchy dance alongside the members of Kis-My-Ft2.

In addition to these two lead tracks, the album also features songs provided by Japanese artists Jeremy Quartus of Nulbarich, Shinichi Osawa, and Gucchi of OverTone.

The album includes "Melody," a track produced based on themes submitted by fan club members, as well as "Fighters", a song born from an idea proposed by the live production team behind Kis-My-Ft2's concert tours.

Additionally, the album contains newly recorded six-member versions of "Curtain Call" and "Meramera", featuring Takashi Nikaido, who has resumed his group activities.

On the album's release date, May 21, the music video for "Half Baked", one of the tracks from the album, was released on YouTube. The video is composed of vertically shot, vlog-style footage featuring each member of Kis-My-Ft2 in different everyday scenarios. Capturing their natural, unfiltered behavior, the video offers viewers an intimate experience, evoking the feeling of being each member’s girlfriend.

On June 16, all tracks from the album became available on music streaming services. On the same day, it was announced that the song "Cheat," one of the album tracks, had been selected as the opening theme for the drama Replica: Motozuma no Fukushū (Replica: Revenge of the Ex-Wife), set to air from July and features group member Kento Senga as one of the main characters. The music video for "Cheat" was also released on YouTube. The video was directed by fellow member Takashi Nikaido, with costumes designed by Yuta Tamamori. Filmed in a single continuous take, the video features the members dressed in elaborate outfits, walking a catwalk in a fashion show-inspired setting.

== Promotion ==
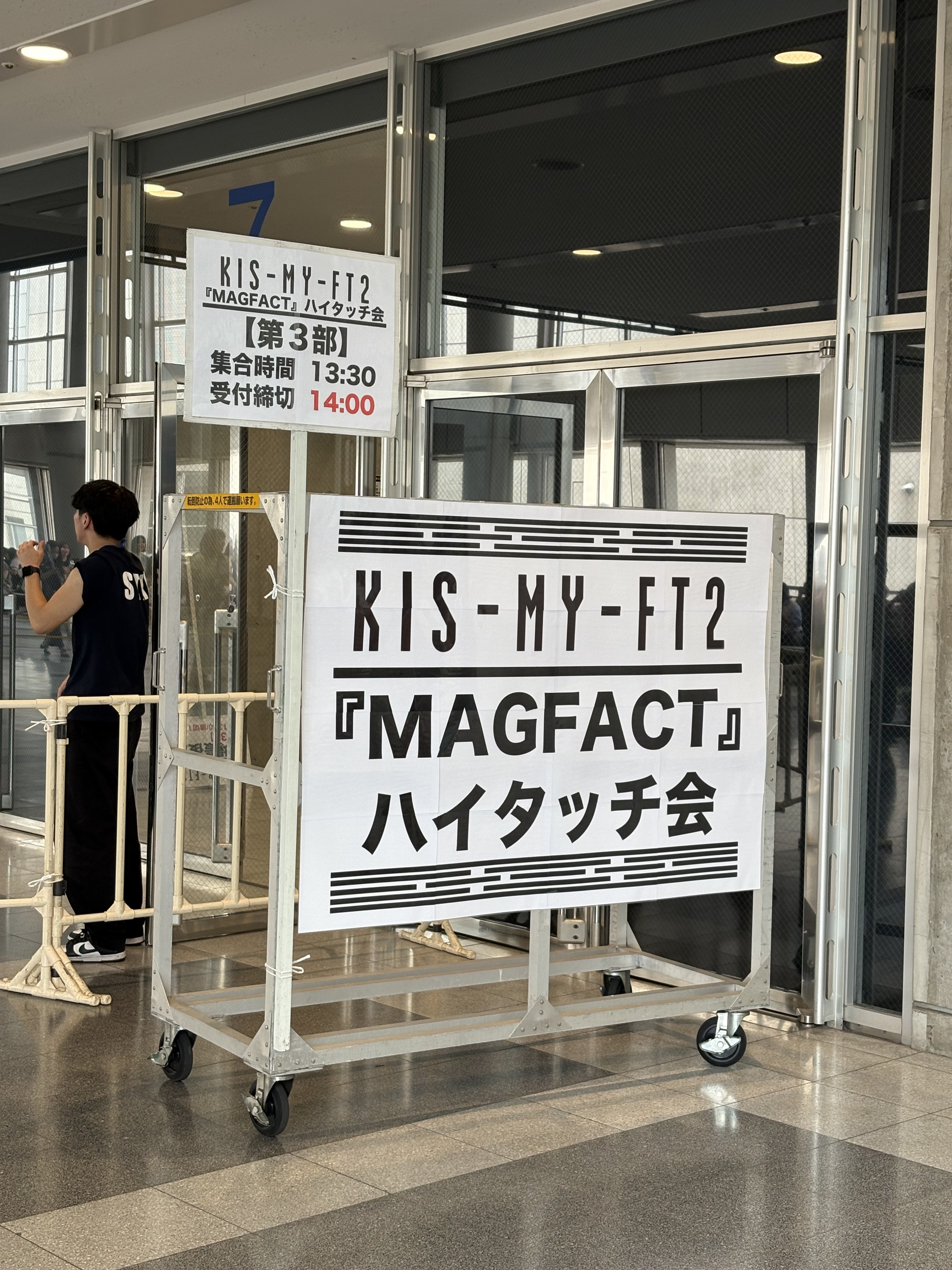
The Magfact high five event at Makuhari Messe, Chiba, Japan, on August 28, 2025.

Prior to the release of the album, the members of Kis-My-Ft2 conducted live promotional events via their personal Instagram accounts and the official paid fan blog platform, "Family Club Web." Additionally, it was announced that in August, the group would host a series of five high five events in Chiba (Makuhari Messe), Nagoya, and Osaka, exclusively for fans who purchased a designated CD set. These high five passes were distributed on a first-come, first-served basis, leading to a surge in traffic to the sales website when the pre-orders began at 6:00 p.m. on May 2. The overwhelming demand caused server congestion that continued late into the night. The initial batches sold out quickly, prompting the release of additional dates, which also sold out soon after.

On the album's release day, the six members served as one-day store managers at music and DVD store (Tower Records) locations across Japan: Fujigaya in Tokyo, Tamamori in Osaka, Nikaido in Sapporo, Senga in Sendai, Miyata in Nagoya, and Yokoo in Fukuoka. At these events, they personally handed out CDs to fans with numbered tickets. In addition, the music video for "Half Baked", one of the tracks from the album, was newly released as part of the promotional campaign.

== Commercial performance ==
Owing to its promotional campaign, a Billboard Japan early report released on May 22 indicated that the album had sold 260,612 copies between May 19 and 21, setting a new record for the group and placing it at the top of the charts. Kis-My-Ft2's latest album, MAGFACT, sold approximately 309,000 copies in its first week, debuting at No. 1 on the Oricon Weekly Albums Chart Ranking dated May 27. This marks the group's 13th consecutive and total No. 1 album since their debut album Kis-My-1st topped the chart on April 9, 2012. With this achievement, the group moved from tied for third to tied for second place in the ranking for "most consecutive No. 1 albums from a debut album" in Oricon history. The first-week sales of 309,000 copies also surpassed their previous record of 300,000 copies set by KIS-MY-WORLD (dated July 13, 2015), setting a new personal best for the group.

== Formats ==
It was released in four formats:

- First edition A (CD, DVD/Blu-ray) – DVD: JWCD-25107/B; Blu-ray: JWCD-25106/B
- First edition B (CD, DVD/Blu-ray) – DVD: JWCD-25109/B; Blu-ray: JWCD-25108/B
- Regular edition (CD):(JWCD-25110)
- Family club store limited edition (2CD, Blu-ray):(JWC1-25111/B)

First edition A includes the music videos for "Glory Days" and "Otsukaresama Desu!" (featuring Sandwichman), along with the album's cover photo shoot and behind-the-scenes footage titled MagFact Behind the Scenes, which documents the making of the music videos.

First edition B features a variety segment titled Attach New Charms! Kis-Mag-Net2, as well as a documentary-style music video for "Melody"—a song produced based on themes submitted by fan club members—showcasing discussions and interactions among the group members during the creative process.

Family club store limited edition includes music videos for four single tracks, along with a newly filmed variety segment titled AI × Kis-My-Ft2: We Asked AI About Kis-My-Ft2. This segment offers different content from the variety feature included in First Edition B.

The regular edition includes an additional bonus track, which is not featured on the other editions.

== Track listing ==
Magfact track listing
No.	Title	Lyrics	Music	Length
1.	""11th" Overture"	KOH (Supa Love)	KOH (Supa Love)	2:17
2.	"Glory Days"	Kamikaze Boy	Kamikaze Boy	4:22
3.	"Otsukaresama Desu!" (featured Sandwichman)	Ryohei Yamamoto	Ryohei Yamamoto, Hisashi Nawata	2:57
4.	"Curtain Call (Note: In contrast to the five-member version included on the single, the album version features all six members, including Nikaido.)"	Yuta (Midori Maeno)	Joacim Persson, Johan Alkenäs, Christofer Erixon	3:23
5.	"Half Baked"	Jeremy Quartus, Ryan Octaviano	Jeremy Quartus	4:34
6.	"Meramera"	Hunch	Hunch, Rover (Royalcomfort, Distorted Wave)	3:58
7.	"Fighters"	Yuta	Stand Alone・Chris Meyer	3:48
8.	"Cheat"	Shinichi Osawa, Kei Owada	Shinichi Osawa, Yohji Igarashi, Kei Owada	3:29
9.	"Lollipop"	Gucchi（OverTone）	Gucchi（OverTone）	3:19
10.	"Melody"	Kenta Urashima	Youth Case	3:57
11.	"Who's Gonna Play? (Note: Introduction song for the members; Regular edition only)"	Rike Kiriyama	Rike Kiriyama	4:25
Total length:				40:34

== Charts ==
=== Weekly charts ===
Weekly chart performance for Magfact
Chart (2025)	Peak position
Japanese Albums (Oricon)	1
Japanese Combined Albums (Oricon)	1
Japanese Hot Albums (Billboard Japan)	1

=== Monthly charts ===
Monthly chart performance for Magfact
Chart (2025)	Position
Japanese Albums (Oricon)	2

=== Year-end charts ===
Year-end chart performance for Magfact
Chart (2025)	Position
Japanese Albums (Oricon)	20
Japanese Top Albums Sales (Billboard Japan)	22

== Certifications ==
Certifications for Magfact
Region	Certification	Certified units/sales
Japan (RIAJ) Physical	Platinum	250,000^{^}
^{^} Shipments figures based on certification alone.
