= Synopsis (album) =

Studio album by Kis-My-Ft2
- Released: May 8, 2024
- Genre: J-pop
- Label: MENT Recording

Kis-My-Ft2 chronology
| Best of Kis-My-Ft2 (2021) | Synopsis (2024) | Magfact (2025) |

Singles from Synopsis
- 1. "Fear/So Blue" Released: September 15, 2021; 2. "Two as One" Released: August 17, 2022; 3. "Heartbreaker / C'monova" Released: January 3, 2024

Music video
- "Loved One" on YouTube "I Miss You" on YouTube "I Miss You (dance performance)" on YouTube

Synopsis (シノプシス：あらすじ) is Kis-My-Ft2's tenth album, released on May 8, 2024, by MENT Recording. It is their first original album in four years since To-y2 (2020) and their first album with six members after departure of Hiromitsu Kitayama in August 2023.

The title is based on the concept of "a new story created with your loved ones". It contains 12 new songs in total for all formats, including six songs supervised and produced by each member.

A live tour under the name of this album Kis-My-Ft2 Dome Tour 2024 Synopsis is scheduled to start on June 8, 2024.

== Songs produced by members ==
Kis-My-Ft2's official Website and X page by MENT Recording held a project titled "#Quiz_Synopsis" about the songs produced by the members, asking people to think about who produced which song. On April 22 and 23, the correct answers and details of each song were announced on X as follows.

1. Keep it 1000
  - Kento Senga produced
  - It reads "Keep It Hanit". The message is to add original color to what you believe in and go strong, no matter what someone around you tries to make negative.
2. B-Side
  - Toshiya Miyata Produced
  - The beautiful parts of human beings are more beautiful because they have weak and dirty parts. This song expresses the other side of human beings as "B-Side".
3. Hoshiyui
  - Wataru Yokoo Produced
  - A mix of modern sounds and Japanese instruments, this song was produced to sound fresh and interesting to people of all ages.
4. With...
  - Taisuke Fujigaya Produced
  - Sampling Johann Sebastian Bach's Air on the G String. The balance between the two was also carefully considered in the creation of this piece. The theme of this song is the existence of people who support us and the happiness that we tend to overlook in our daily lives.
5. Wani-Wani
  - Yuta Tamamori Produced
  - Warning. Rather than the words of those who say whatever they want, we stand strong with the "voice" that calls us in the darkness before the curtain rises. This song is inspired by the image of such a figure.
6. Connecting!
  - Takashi Nikaido Produced
  - Created with the concept of "connecting people with people". This is a digital rock song that is designed for live performances, so that everyone can enjoy and make noise together through call and response.

== Commercial performance ==
This album topped Billboard Japan weekly Top Albums Sales chart published on May 15, 2024 (for the period May 6–12, 2024), selling 127,475 copies in its first week.

It also sold 126,000 copies in its first week on the Oricon Weekly Album Chart dated May 20, which was announced on May 14.

This is their 12th consecutive album to reach No. 1 since their first album, Kis-My-1st, reached No. 1 in 2012. In addition, the group has gone from a tie for third place in the all-time ranking to the all-time single No. 3 ranking for number of consecutive No. 1 albums. (Note: Record for the number of consecutive No. 1 albums since their 1st album: 1st: NEWS (15 albums), 2nd: KAT-TUN (13 albums), 3rd: Kis-My-Ft2 (12 albums))

== Formats ==
It was released in four formats:

- First edition A (CD+DVD/Blu-ray) – DVD: JWCD-98623/B; Blu-ray: JWCD-98624/B
- First edition B (CD+DVD/Blu-ray) – DVD: JWCD-98625/B; Blu-ray: JWCD-98626/B
- Normal edition (CD):(JWCD-98627)
- ×××××. Pop Up Store limited edition (2CD+Blu-ray):(JWC1-98628～9/B)

The first pressing A includes music videos for the songs "Loved One" and "I Miss You", a solo edit of "I Miss You", and a documentary on the making of the album. The first pressing B includes a bonus video filmed by the band and a solo interview about the songs produced by the band. In addition, the ×××××.Pop Up Store exclusive products includes sound and music videos of singles and songs not on the CD that have been released since the previous album. The first pressing A/B and the standard pressing (initial specs) include a serial number for viewing the video and an entry ticket.

== Track listing ==
=== CD ===
+ is included only on the standard edition. ++ is included only on the normal edition and first edition A. +++ is only included on the standard and first pressing B editions.

1. "'10th' Overture"
2. "Loved One"
3. "C'monova"
4. "Connecting!" (song produced by Takashi Nikaido)
5. "Keep It 100" (song produced by Kento Senga)
6. "Wani-Wani" (song produced by Yuta Tamamori)
7. "Chillax'" ++
8. "Heartbreaker"
9. "B-Side" (song produced by Toshiya Miyata)
10. "Hoshi Yui" (ほしゆい; song produced by Wataru Yokoo)
11. "With..." (song produced by Taisuke Fujigaya)
12. "Reset"
13. "Forever Girl"
14. "Waratte Naite" (笑って 泣いて) +
15. "I Miss You"

==== Special CD ====
- Only for the limited products of ×××××.Pop Up Store
1. "Fear"
2. "So Blue"
3. "Two as One"
4. "Souka"
5. "Lemon Pie" (theme song for TV Asahi's Saturday Drama starring Taisuke Fujigaya, Hamaru Otoko ni Kikutai Onna)
6. "Sweet Melody" (theme song for the film Otonanaimi starring Mizuki Inoue of HiHi Jets and Takashi Nikaido)

=== DVD/Blu-ray ===
- ×××××.Pop Up Store limited products are only available on Blu-ray
- First Edition A
1. "Loved One" (music video)
2. "I Miss You" (music video)
3. "I Miss You" (solo edit)
  1. Kento Senga ver.
  2. Toshiya Miyata ver.
  3. Wataru Yokoo ver.
  4. Taisuke Fujigaya ver.
  5. Yuta Tamamori ver.
  6. Takashi Nikaido ver.
4. Documentary of the making of "Synopsis"
- First Edition B
1. Kismai Bibiriland (the members experience the attractions at the Fuji-Q Highland amusement park)
2. Solo interview about the concept of the song produced/supervised by the members
- ×××××.Pop Up Store limited products
1. "Fear" (music video)
2. "Two as One" (music video)
3. "Omoibana" (music video)
4. "Sweet Melody" (music video)

== Charts ==
Chart performance for Synopsis
| Chart (2024) | Peak position |
|---|---|
| Japanese Albums (Oricon) | 1 |
| Japanese Combined Albums (Oricon) | 1 |
| Japanese Hot Albums (Billboard Japan) | 1 |
