= Edge of Days =

Single by Kis-My-Ft2

from the album To-y2
- B-side: "Mr.Fresh"; "Koakuma Lip"; "Innocent" (regular edition)
- Released: November 13, 2019
- Genre: J-pop
- Label: Avex Trax
- Composer: Hikari
- Lyricist: Hikari

Kis-My-Ft2 singles chronology
"Hands Up" (2019)	"Edge of Days" (2019)	"Endless Summer" (2020)

Music video
- "Edge of Days" on YouTube "Mr.Fresh" on YouTube

"Edge of Days" is Japanese boy band Kis-My-Ft2's 25th single, released on November 13, 2019, by Avex Trax.

== Overview ==
This is the first single in about four months since the previous single "Hands Up". The title song is the theme song for the TV Tokyo drama Million Joe starring Hiromitsu Kitayama.

The music video for the song tells the story of the members dressed as spies trying to find the trump card Joker in order to shine a ray of hope in the world. Kitayama plays as a thief, Kento Senga is as a sniper, Toshiya Miyata is as a hacker, Wataru Yokoo is as a locksmith, Taisuke Fujigaya is as a biker, Yuta Tamamori is as a thinker, and Takashi Nikaido is as a bomb disposal agent. The video also includes a dance performance of the seven members in conjunction with moving lights.

The B-side song "Mr. Fresh", which is included in all forms of the album, is the commercial song for Unicharm's "Wave Floor Wiper", starring Yuta Tamamori. The music video, produced under the theme of "everyday" and "extraordinary", is set on a train reminiscent of a New York subway in the U.S., and features a glamorous, club-like atmosphere. The members give an extraordinary performance using suspension straps and poles inside the train, which is decorated in a club-like atmosphere.

The other B-side song "Koakuma Lip" included in the regular edition is the theme song for dTV (Lemino)'s "Kis-My Dokidokin" featuring the members.

The first edition A includes the music video and making document of the title song. The first pressing B includes the music video of "Mr. Fresh" and "Kis-My-TV (Who's cheating you?)" and "Kis-My-TV (Funny Sports)". The regular edition includes the coupling song "Innocent".

== Chart performance ==
The song debuted at No. 1 on the Oricon Weekly Singles Chart dated November 25, 2019. This is the 25th consecutive No. 1 ranking since their debut single Everybody Go. This single topped Billboard Japan Hot 100 as of November 25, 2019 (total period: November 11 to 17, 2019).

== Editions ==
- First edition A (AVCD-94663/B): CD, DVD
- First edition B (AVCD-94664/B): CD, DVD
- Regular edition (AVCD-94665): CD

== Track listing ==
=== CD ===
1. "Edge of Days" (3:58)
2. "Mr. Fresh" (4:04)
3. "Koakuma Lip" (4:06) (regular edition only)
4. "Innocent" (5:08) (regular edition only)

=== DVD ===
- First edition A
1. "Edge of Days" Music Video
2. "Edge of Days" & "Mr.Fresh" Music Video making document
- First edition B
1. "Mr. Fresh" Music Video
2. Kis-My-TV (Who's cheating you?)
3. Kis-My-TV (Funny Sports)
