= Curtain Call (Kis-My-Ft2 song) =

Single by Kis-My-Ft2
- B-side: "Meramera"; "Shindo"; "Yummy, lovely night"
- Released: January 8, 2025
- Genre: J-pop
- Label: MENT Recording
- Composers: Joacim Persson, Johan Alkenas, Christofer Erixon, Ricardo Burgrust
- Lyricist: Yuta (Midori Maeno)

Kis-My-Ft2 singles chronology
| "Heartbreaker / C'monova" (2024) | "Curtain Call" (2025) | "&Joy" (2025) |

Music video
- "Curtain Call" on YouTube "Meramera" on YouTube

"Curtain Call" (カーテンコール) is the 32nd single by Japanese boy band Kis-My-Ft2. It was released on January 8, 2025.

== Overview ==
The title track, "Curtain Call," is about the sex appeal of adults as the members of Kis-My-Ft2 transport the audience into an unrealistic world like a scene from a movie. The music video features intense dance scenes as well as sexy scenes that only their thirties can express, and has received more than 6.5 million views on YouTube within a week of its release. Since one of the members, Takashi Nikaido, had been on medical leave since September of the previous year, this song was recorded by the five members except Nikaido. However, in the music video, they performed with a space left open for one person to indicate Nikaido's place. Also, in the TV music show they appeared in for promotion, the vacant space was illuminated by a green spotlight, Nikaido's member color, suggesting Nikaido's presence.

=== Other songs ===
The song "Meramera" on the B-Side is the opening theme song for the 2025 anime series Cardfight!! Vanguard Divinez Deluxe Arc in which Miyata also voices its lead character Akina Myodo; he also takes on the center role in singing the song's lyrics and performing the music video's dance sequences with the other members. The music video's inclusion of a dance performance was a request by Miyata, who wished for kids "who know Kis-My-Ft2 from the anime to think it's cool too." The music video also features a dynamic dance scene in which 24 dancers and Kis-My-Ft2's performance are fused together. The music video, too, has received more than 4.2 million views on YouTube in just one month since its release.

"Shindo" is a duo song by Tamamori and Miyata. "Shindo" is a Japanese word with a wide range of negative meanings, such as "I am tired of" or "It's tough." This is the fourth duo song by Tamamori and Miyata. Tamamori said that in discussions during the production process, they decided on this song with the phrase "Shindo" because they wanted to "put some interesting phrases in the new song." Since it was titled "Shindo," the two also did a physically tiring promotion of 32 push-ups.

"Yummy, lovely night" is a trio song by Fujigaya, Yokoo, and Senga. This is the second song by the three since "ConneXion" on the 21st single Love. In this song, the lyric "Yummy, lovely night," which is also the title of the song, was intended to be misheard as the Japanese word "yamerarenai" ("I can't stop"). In promoting the single, the three talk about habits they have recently found themselves unable to stop or wanting to stop.

The Family Club Online Shop Limited Edition includes a digest video of the special event "The Witch and the Six Sleeping Princes" held on August 10, 2024, as well as their performance videos "Loved One" and "Connecting!" from their Tokyo performance of Kis-My-Ft2 Dome Tour 2024 Synopsys. In addition, there are solo videos by the five members "Room short version" and "Elevator short version" of "Curtain Call" music videos.

== The world view of "Curtain Call" ==
Is this reality or a dream? It is as if Kis-My-Ft2 is leading listeners into a scene from a movie. Avexnet describes the world of this song as follows. You ride an elevator to the basement of a building in the metropolis, where you find the members of Kis-My-Ft2 dressed in chic suits. There, their secret shows are held on a purple stage. They captivate with their daring and graceful dance. Waiting beyond is an apartment divided into six glass-walled rooms, where you can peek into their off-screen lives. Yuta Tamamori's room has a bathtub and a vase of flowers, revealing the muscles in Tamamori's back that he worked out for the TV series (I Wanna Punch That Scumbag!) he was filming at this time. Toshiya Miyata lounges on the bed in his bare shirt, while Taisuke Fujigaya plays with fruit, takes a shower, and does not hide his sexiness. Kento Senga, dressed in a black tank top, looks provocatively at the camera in the pink lighting, while Wataru Yokoo sits on the sofa with an old fashioned glass in his hand and a melancholy expression on his face. The room with the single-seat sofa in the upper left corner is Takashi Nikaido's room, and the fact that Nikaido's place is vacated at the end of the dance indicates that Kis-My-Ft2 is a six-member group.

== Commercial performance ==
On January 9, 2025, Billboard Japan reported that Curtain Call sold 91,395 copies on the daily charts and was currently at the top. The single was ranked number-one in the Oricon Weekly Singles Chart on January 14. With this single, Kis-My-Ft2 has had 32 consecutive top singles since their debut single Everybody Go, they broke the “number of consecutive No. 1 singles since their debut (1st)” from a tie for third place to third place alone in the all-time list. In addition, they topped the Billboard JAPAN Weekly Singles Sales Chart "Top Singles Sales" released on January 15 (period: January 6 to 12, 2025), selling 121,351 copies. The single was ranked No. 4 on Billboard Japan Hot 100 released on January 15.

== Package specification ==
Four versions were released .

- First edition A (JWCD-98671/B)
- First edition B (JWCD-98672/B)
- Regular edition (JWCD-98673)
- Family club limited edition (JWC1-98674/B)

The pre-order bonus for this single included an A4 size clear poster for the first pressing A, a B5 size 2025 sticker sheet for the first pressing B, and three types of other jackets for the standard pressing. In addition, a card with a serial number will be enclosed in the first-run discs A, B and the standard disc, and a special website will allow users to view videos from the previous year's live documentaries and recording videos of "Shindo" and "Yummy, lovely night" for a limited time.

== Track listing ==
=== CD ===
- Included only on Regular edition after "Shindo"
1. "Curtain Call" [3:23]
  - Lyrics by Yuta (Midori Maeno)
  - Composed by Joacim Persson, Johan Alkenas, Christofer Erixon, Ricardo Burgrust
  - Arranged by Joacim Persson, Johan Alkenas
2. "Meramera" [3:59]
  - Lyrics by hunch
  - Composed by hunch, Rover (Royalcomfort, Distorted Wave)
  - Arranged by Rover (Royalcomfort, Distorted Wave)
3. "Shindo" (Tamamori and Miyata) [3:38] (Regular edition only)
  - Lyrics by Yoshifumi Kanamaru
  - Composed by Kanata Okajima, Hayato Yamamoto, pw.a
  - Arranged by pw.a
4. "Yummy, lovely night" (Fujigaya, Senga and Yokoo) [3:26] (Regular edition only)
  - Lyrics and Composed by Tsingtao, Samuel Kim, Sorato
  - Arranged by Sorato
5. "Curtain Call -Instrumental-" (Regular edition only)
6. "Meramera -Instrumental-" (Regular edition only)
7. "Shindo -Instrumental-" (Regular edition only)
8. "Yummy, lovely night -Instrumental-" (Regular edition only)

=== DVD ===
- First Edition A
1. "Curtain Call" Music Video
2. "Curtain Call" Music Video & Jacket Filming Making Documentary
3. "Meramera" Music Video Filming Making Documentary
- First Edition B
1. "Meramera" Music Video
2. New year Kis-My-Challenge 2025
- Family club limited edition
1. "The Witch and the Six Sleeping Princes" Digest
2. Loved One (Kis-My-Ft2 Dome Tour 2024 Synopsis / July 7, 2024 at Tokyo Dome)
3. Connecting! (Kis-My-Ft2 Dome Tour 2024 Synopsis / July 7, 2024 at Tokyo Dome)
4. Curtain Call solo angle Room short version
5. Curtain Call solo angle Elevator short version

== Charts ==
Chart performance for "Curtain Call"
| Chart (2025) | Peak position |
|---|---|
| Japan (Japan Hot 100) | 4 |
| Japan (Oricon) | 1 |
| Japan Combined Singles (Oricon) | 1 |

== Certifications ==
Certifications for "Crazy"
| Region | Certification | Certified units/sales |
|---|---|---|
| Japan (RIAJ) Physical | Gold | 100,000^{^} |
^{^} Shipments figures based on certification alone.
