= Fear/So Blue =

Single by Kis-My-Ft2

from the album Synopsis
- A-side: "Fear", "So Blue"
- B-side: "Shining Ace" (Regular edition)
- Released: September 15, 2021 (Japan)
- Genre: J-pop
- Label: Avex Trax

Kis-My-Ft2 singles chronology
"Luv Bias" (2021)	"Fear/So Blue" (2021)	"Two as One" (2022)

Music video
- "Fear" on YouTube "So Blue"(Lyric Video) on YouTube "Hai ni narumae ni" on YouTube "Buzz" on YouTube "Nemophila" on YouTube "Boku wo terasu mono" on YouTube "Yobukoe" on YouTube "Share Love" on YouTube "Brave Tuning" on YouTube

"Fear/So Blue" is the 28th single (double A-side) by Japanese boy band Kis-My-Ft2, released on September 15, 2021, by Avex Trax.

It has been about eight years since "Snow Dome no Yakusoku/Luv Sick" was released as a double A-side single.

== Overview ==
"Fear" is the theme song of TV Tokyo's drama Just not divorced starring Hiromitsu Kitayama. The song "So Blue" is used as the Kis-My-Ft2 and Line Music campaign song and the theme song for Fuji Television's "Moshi Mo Tours".

"Fear" was the theme song for a drama dealing with a tragedy that began with adultery. The music video was made to express the "fear" and "conflict" of love, struggling in the forest named love.

The single was released in three formats: first edition A/B and regular edition. The bonus DVD for the first disc A includes music videos of seven solo songs created for the "Kis-My-Ft2 Live Tour 2021 Home" live performance, while the bonus DVD for the first disc B includes a documentary on the making of the songs. The regular disc includes "Shining Ace", a commercial song for Kowa (company) "Unakowa Ace", and the bonus DVD includes the music video of "Fear" and the making of the song.

"So Blue" has been available on Line Music since September 1 for the first time as their song. Although there is no music video for the song, from September 1 to 3, a "#KissMy 47 Prefectures' Sky Connecting Lyric Video Production Campaign" was held on Twitter to collect photos and videos of the sky for the song's lyric video. The completed lyric video was distributed on Line Music from September 15 at 5:00 p.m., and was also released on avex's official YouTube channel at 10:00 p.m. on September 17. "CDTV Live Live!" on TBS Television (Japan) on September 13.

"Fear" was made available on Line Music on the same day as the release date.

== Chart performance ==
With first-week sales of 130,000 copies, "Everybody Go" debuted at No. 1 on the Oricon Weekly Singles Ranking released on September 21, 2021.

This was their 28th consecutive No. 1 single since their debut single "Everybody Go", and tied with NEWS (band) for 4th place in the history of the number of consecutive No. 1 singles since their debut (1st), making it 28th on the record and 4th alone in the history of the chart.

== Track listing ==
=== CD ===
- First Edition A
  - Included only on the standard disc after "Shining Ace".
1. "Fear" (4:09)
2. "So Blue" (4:00)
3. "Shining Ace" (3:59)
- First Edition B
1. "So Blue"
2. "Fear"
- Regular Edition
1. "Fear"
2. "So Blue"
3. "Shining Ace"
4. "Fear (Instrumental)"
5. "So Blue (Instrumental)"
6. "Shining Ace (Instrumental)" (featuring Kis-My-F2)

=== DVD ===
- Regular Edition
1. "Fear" Music Video
2. "Fear" Jacket Shooting & Making of Music Video Documentary
- First Edition A/B: The First Edition A includes the following their solo music videos, and the First Edition B includes making documents of MVs.
1. "Hai ni Narumae Ni" (Before I burn and turn to ash) - Hiromitsu Kitayama
2. "Buzz" - Kento Senga
3. "Nemophila" - Toshiya Miyata feat. Tokiya Ichinose from (Uta no Prince-sama)
4. "Boku wo terasu mono" - Wataru Yokoo
5. "Yobukoe" - Taisuke Fujigaya
6. "Share Love" - Yuta Tamamori
7. "Brave Tuning" - Takashi Nikaido

== Package specifications ==
- First edition A (AVCD-61127/B): CD & DVD
- First edition B (AVCD-61128/B): CD & DVD
- Regular Edition (AVCD-61129/B): CD & DVD
