= Endless Summer (Kis-My-Ft2 song) =

Single by Kis-My-Ft2

from the album Best of Kis-My-Ft2
- B-side: "Sailing"; "Catapult"; "Let you go"; "Endless Summer" (Bon Odori ver.)
- Released: September 16, 2020 (Japan)
- Genre: J-pop
- Length: 4:18
- Label: Avex Trax

Kis-My-Ft2 singles chronology
"Edge of Days" (2019)	"Endless Summer" (2020)	"Luv Bias" (2021)

Music video
- "Endless Summer" on YouTube

"Endless Summer" is Japanese boy band Kis-My-Ft2's 26th single, released on September 16, 2020, by Avex Trax.

== Overview ==
The first single in about 10 months since the previous single "Edge of Days," this is the only single of their released in 2020.

The title song "Endless Summer" is the theme song for the TV Asahi Friday night drama Manatsu no Shonen: 19452020 starring Bi shonen (Johnny's Jr.). This is the first time for a Kis-My-Ft2 member to sing the theme song for a drama in which they do not appear regularly. They also performed the title song on TV Asahi's music show Music Station broadcast on September 11, 2020, in their first collaboration with the bishonen. The coupling song, "Saling" is a commercial song for Kowa's insect bite ointment "Unakowa Ace".

In addition, the music video for "Endless Summer", which pays homage to their debut song "Everybody Go", is based on the theme of "going back to their roots" as they celebrate the 9th anniversary of their CD debut. The music video was released on August 10, 2020, the 9th anniversary of their debut.

It was released in three formats: first edition A, B and regular edition. The first edition A includes a DVD with the music video of the title song and the making of the song.

The DVD of first edition B includes the original variety show "Kis-My-TV" and the music video for "Positive Man" which was broadcast live on May 31, 2012, on the "Kiss Mai Dokidoki Live Special Program". When "Positive Man" aired on the program, the TV station received many requests from viewers to see it again.

== Chart performance ==
With sales of 187,000 copies in the first week, "Everybody Go" ranked No. 1 on the Oricon Weekly Singles Chart dated September 28, 2020. This was the 26th consecutive No. 1 single since their first single "Everybody Go," and the single ranked No. 1 on the Oricon Weekly Singles Chart for the first time since their debut, which had been tied for fourth place with NEWS. This single also topped Billboard Japan Hot 100 as of September 28, 2020 (counting period: September 14 to September 20, 2020).

== Package specifications ==
- First edition A (CD & DVD) (AVCD-94916/B): CD, DVD
- First edition B (CD & DVD) (AVCD-94917/B): CD, DVD
- Regular edition (AVCD-94918): CD

== Track listing ==
=== CD ===
1. "Endless Summer" (4:18)
2. "Sailing" (4:19)
3. "Catapult" (3:36), (regular edition only)
4. "Let you go" (3:45), (regular edition only)
5. "Endless Summer" (Bon Odori ver.) (3:16), (regular edition only)

=== DVD ===
- First edition A
1. "Endless Summer" Music Video
2. "Endless Summer" Making Documentary
- First edition B
1. "Kis-My-TV Quiz"
2. "Positive Man" Music Video
