= Hands Up (Kis-My-Ft2 song) =

Single by Kis-My-Ft2

from the album To-y2
- B-side: "Opapipo" (First Edition A); "Midsummer and the sun" (Regular Edition); "Forever Knot" (B/Regular Edition); "Go for it!"(Regular Edition)
- Released: July 10, 2019 (Japan)
- Genre: J-pop
- Length: 3:49
- Label: Avex Trax
- Composers: Christian Jansson, CR, Subin Kim
- Lyricist: Satoru Kurihara

Kis-My-Ft2 singles chronology
"Kimi wo Daisuki da" (2019)	"Hands Up" (2019)	"Edge of Days" (2019)

Music video
- "Hands Up" on YouTube "Forever Knot"(Lip ver.) on YouTube

"Hands Up" is the 24th single by Japanese boy band Kis-My-Ft2. It was released on July 10, 2019, by record label Avex Trax.

== Overview ==
The title song "Hands Up" features aggressive and intense dancing. The dance that is performed violently to the lyrics of the chorus part of this song was named the "Boom Boom Dance". Including lyrics that inspire feelings such as "push forward" and "unleash," the song gives a sense of momentum to push forward, aiming for the highest peak and a new way of one's own life.

The B-Side song "Opapipo" from First Edition A is the ending theme song for their variety show Kis-My Doki Doki and is used when they dance with children.

Another B-Side song "Forever Knot" included in the first edition B is a TV commercial song for Recruit (company)'s "Zexy Enmusubi" (Marriage Information Magazine) in which the members appear. "Midsummer and the sun" included regular edition is the commercial song for Kowa's "Unakowa Cool" featuring Kis-My-Ft2. The jacket photo was released on June 17, 2019.

== Chart performance ==
The song debuted at No. 1 on the Oricon Weekly Single Ranking dated July 22, 2019. This is their 24th consecutive No. 1 appearance since their debut single "Everybody Go". First-week sales: 196,438 copies (Oricon count).

Billboard Japan announced that the single topped Billboard Japan Hot 100 overall in its first week on July 17, 2019.

By December 8, 2019, the album had sold a total of 211,888 copies, earning it #32 on the annual Oricon Album Ranking for 2019.

== Package specifications ==
- First edition A (CD, DVD) (AVCD-94451/B)
- First edition B (CD, DVD) (AVCD-94452/B)
- Regular Edition (AVCD-94453) CD only

== Track listing ==
=== CD ===
- First edition A
1. "Hands Up" (3:49)
2. "Opapipo" (1:50)
- First edition B
1. "Hands Up"
2. "Forever Knot" (4:45)
- Regular edition
1. "Hands Up"
2. "Midsummer and the sun" (4:24)
3. "Forever Knot"
4. "Go for it!"

=== DVD ===
- First Edition A
1. "Hands Up" Music video
2. "Hands Up" Music video making document
- First Edition B
1. "Forever Knot" (Lip ver.)
2. "Lulalulala" (Hug movie)
3. Jacket Shooting & "Forever Knot" Special Interview
