= Kis-My-Ft2 =

Japanese boy band

- Origin: Tokyo, Japan
- Genre: J-pop
- Years active: 2005–present
- Labels: Avex Trax (2005–2022); MENT Recording (2022–present)
- Spinoffs: Busaiku
- Members: Kento Senga; Toshiya Miyata; Wataru Yokoo; Taisuke Fujigaya; Yuta Tamamori; Takashi Nikaido
- Past members: Hiromitsu Kitayama
- Website: Kis-My-Ft2 (MENT Recording); Kis-My-Ft2(Starto Entertainment)

YouTube information
- Channel: Kis-My-Ft2
- Years active: 2022–present
- Genre: Music
- Subscribers: 516 thousand
- Views: 464 million
- Last updated: 14 February 2026

Kis-My-Ft2 (キスマイフットツー, Kisu Mai Futto Tsū, "Kiss My Foot Two") is a six-member Japanese boy band under Starto Entertainment, noted in Japanese media for incorporating roller-skating into their stage performances.

The group was formed on 26 July 2005 while the members were trainees (Johnny's Jr.). On 12 February 2011, during a concert tour, they received a surprise announcement of their official debut in what later became known as the "brown envelope" event. They made their CD debut on 10 August 2011.

Since their debut, Kis-My-Ft2 has achieved multiple number-one singles and albums on the Oricon charts and has held large-scale arena and dome tours across Japan, including performances at Tokyo Dome. The group has also appeared on NHK’s annual music program Kōhaku Uta Gassen.

The group debuted as a seven-member act including Hiromitsu Kitayama; following his departure in August 2023, Kis-My-Ft2 has continued as a six-member group. The current members are Kento Senga, Toshiya Miyata, Wataru Yokoo, Taisuke Fujigaya, Yuta Tamamori, and Takashi Nikaido.

They are signed to MENT Recording, a joint label established by Avex Inc. and Johnny & Associates.

Notable releases include their debut single "Everybody Go", their highest-selling single "Thank You Jan!", and the drama theme song "Luv Bias", which received an award in 2021.

The name is derived from the initials of its members’ surnames, as well as a reference to an anecdote in which tap dancer Gregory Hines kissed the shoe of Sammy Davis Jr.

== Members ==
In Kis-My-Ft2, each member is assigned a "member color," which is used in official costumes, merchandise, and promotional materials.

Name	Japanese	Hepburn	Member color
Kento Senga	千賀 健永	Senga Kento	Light blue
Toshiya Miyata	宮田 俊哉	Miyata Toshiya	Purple
Wataru Yokoo	横尾 渉	Yokō Wataru	Orange
Taisuke Fujigaya	藤ヶ谷 太輔	Fujigaya Taisuke	Pink
Yuta Tamamori	玉森 裕太	Tamamori Yūta	Yellow
Takashi Nikaido	二階堂 高嗣	Nikaidō Takashi	Green

Former member

Name	Japanese	Hepburn	Member color
Hiromitsu Kitayama	北山 宏光	Kitayama Hiromitsu	Red

== History ==
=== Formation and pre-debut (2005–2010) ===
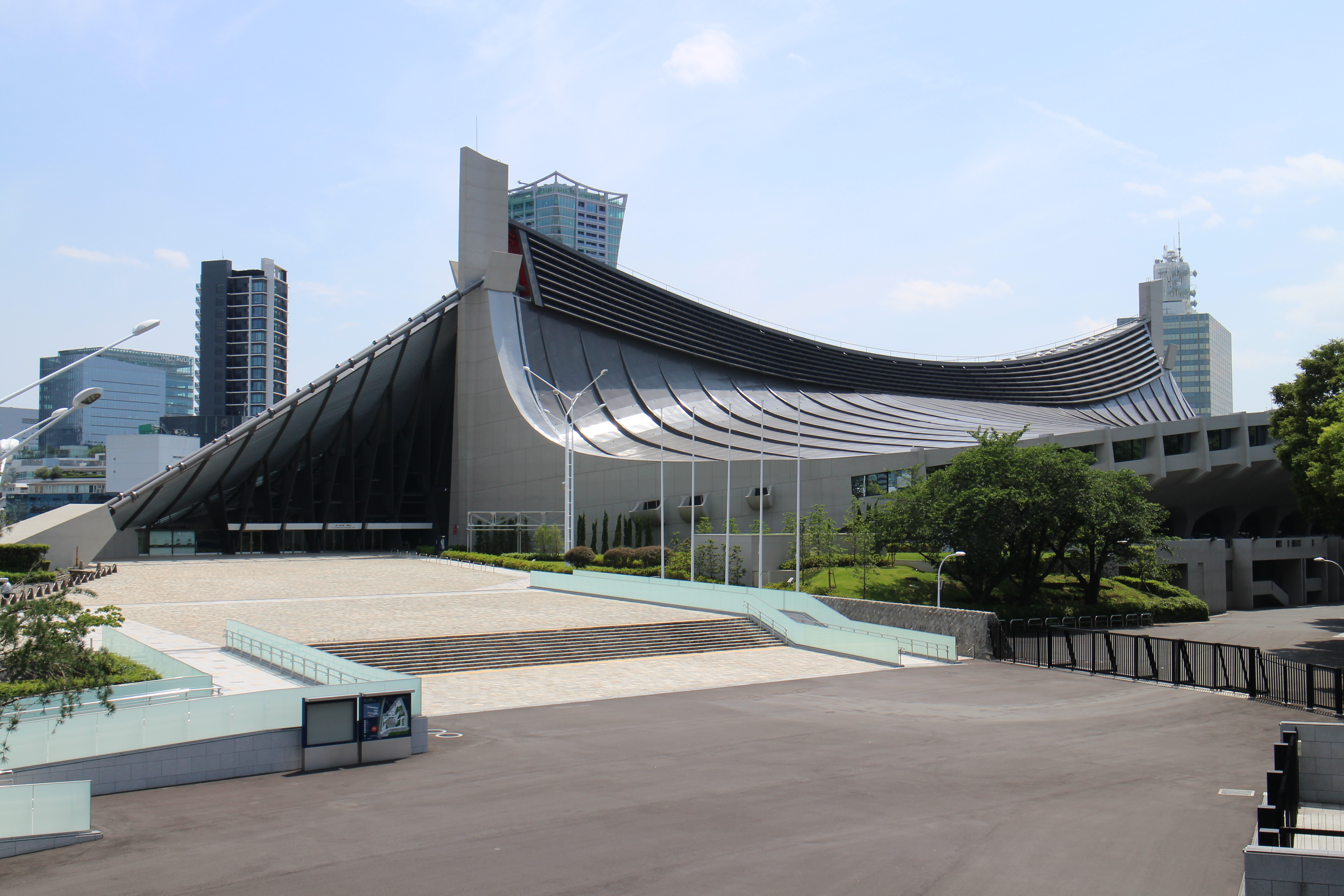
Yoyogi National Gymnasium, where the group received their debut announcement during a concert, later referred to as the “brown envelope” announcement.

Kis-My-Ft2 was formed on 26 July 2005 under Johnny & Associates through the merger of two trainee units, Kis-My-Ft. and A.B.C.-Jr., while the members were trainees in Johnny's Jr.. At the time of the group’s formation, the lineup included additional trainees who departed prior to the group’s official debut.

The group performed in stage productions and concerts, gradually building experience over a prolonged pre-debut period. Their performance style was influenced by the agency’s senior group Hikaru Genji, with Japanese media frequently noting their use of roller skates.

In the late 2000s, the group held their first solo concerts and appeared in established stage productions such as Playzone.

On 12 February 2011, during their concert tour Kis-My-Ft ni Aeru de Show Vol. 3, the members received a surprise letter from agency president at the time Johnny Kitagawa announcing their official debut, an event later known as the "brown envelope" announcement. (Note: At this time, in the middle of the on-stage banter, the members received a surprise letter from the president, Johnny Kitagawa. The letter, which was in a brown envelope, stated that their debut had been decided, so fans still refer to this day as 'brown envelope day'.)

=== Debut and breakthrough (2011) ===
Kis-My-Ft2 made their CD debut on 10 August 2011 with the single "Everybody Go," which reached number one on the Oricon Singles Chart. Originally scheduled for earlier release, their debut was postponed due to the 2011 Tōhoku earthquake and tsunami. The single ultimately marked a major breakthrough following their long trainee period. The single was simultaneously distributed across several Asian territories, and the group held a debut event at Yebisu Garden Place in Tokyo attended by approximately 12,000 fans. They also appeared on the television program SMAP×SMAP, where they were congratulated by senior group SMAP.

Following their debut, the group held a concert at Tokyo Dome 18 days after their debut, setting what was reported at the time as a record for a male artist. The achievement drew significant media attention and positioned the group as a major new act in the Japanese idol scene.

=== Commercial success and large-scale tours (2012–2017) ===
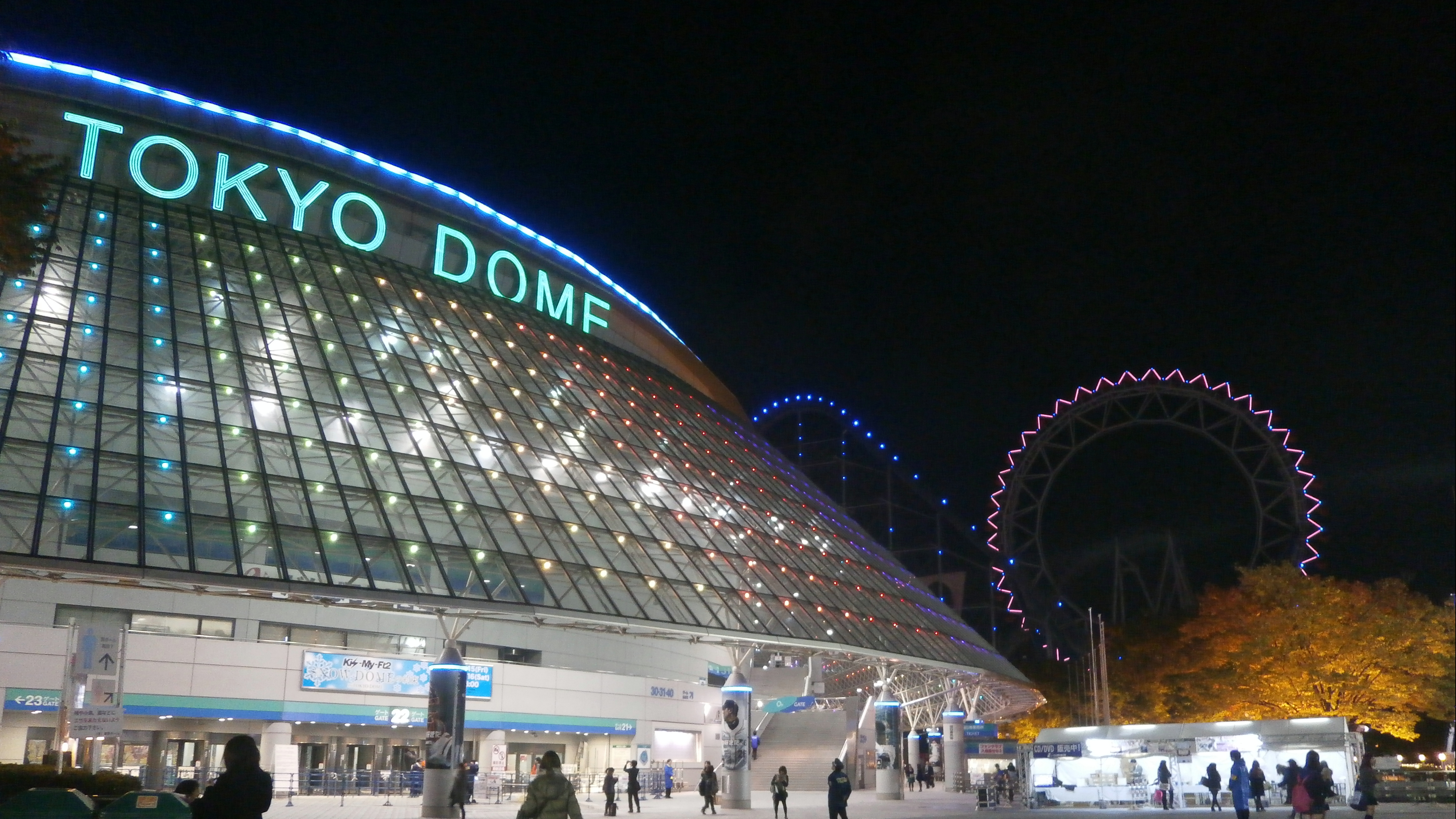
Tokyo Dome on the day of Kis-My-Ft2’s concert Snow Dome no Yakusoku in Tokyo Dome (2013).

Throughout the early to mid-2010s, Kis-My-Ft2 released a series of chart-topping singles and albums, including their first studio album Kis-My-1st. In March 2012, on the day of the release of the single "She! Her! Her!", the group held a promotional event in Osaka, performing the song aboard a boat on the Dōtonbori Canal, an unusual public setting that drew large crowds and media attention. They subsequently embarked on nationwide arena and dome tours, with Japanese media frequently highlighting their elaborate live productions and large-scale stage effects.

In 2014, the group further expanded their visibility through mainstream media projects, including the single "Hikari no Signal," which served as the theme song for animated film Doraemon: New Nobita's Great Demon—Peko and the Exploration Party of Five. The single reached number one on the Oricon Singles Chart, continuing their streak of commercial success.

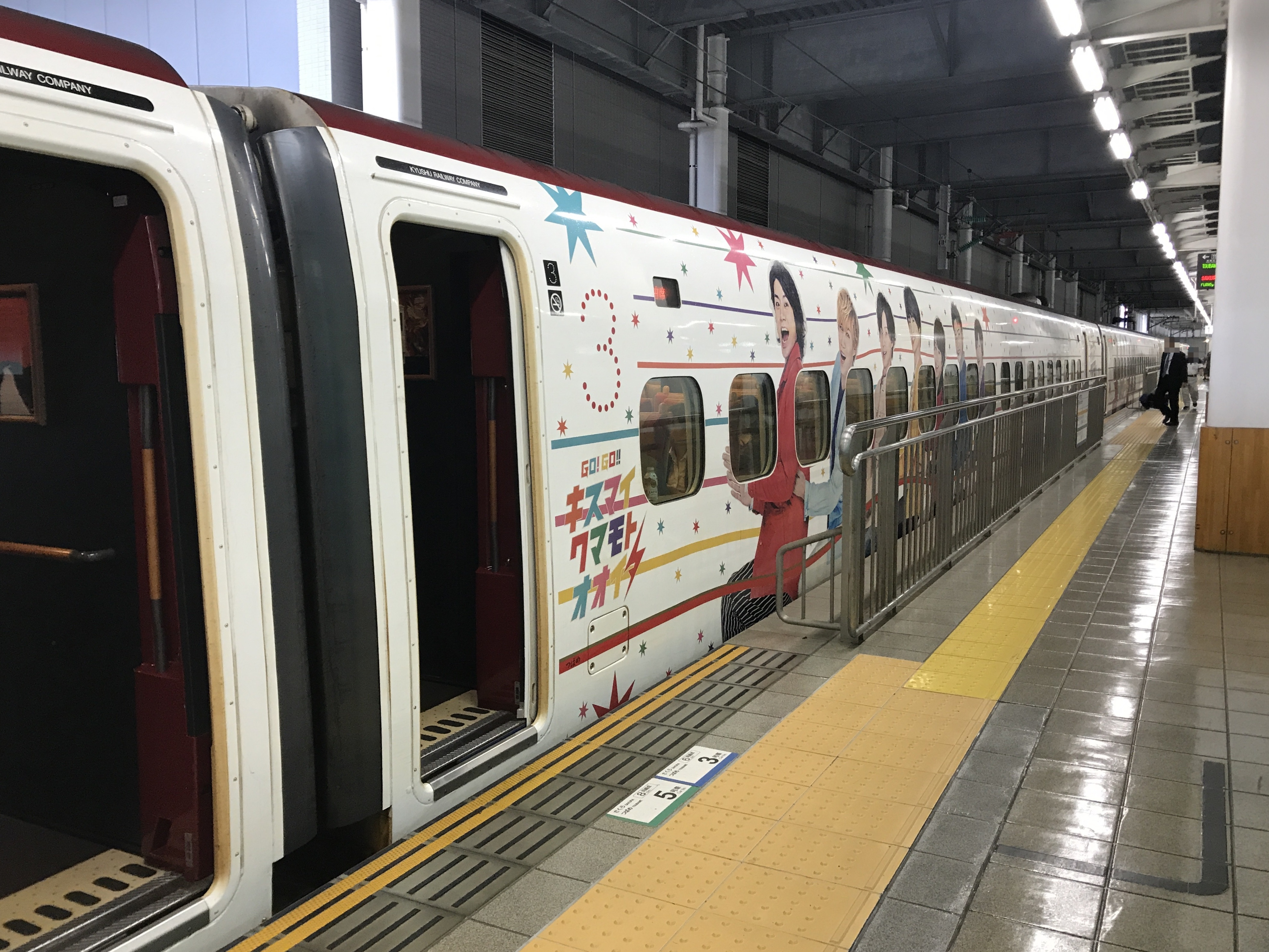
The Kyushu Shinkansen "Tsubame" with Kis-My-Ft2 members printed on it (2017)

Beyond music activities, the group also participated in large-scale promotional campaigns. In 2017, Kis-My-Ft2 participated in a tourism campaign organized by Kyushu Railway Company to promote recovery in Kumamoto and Ōita Prefectures following the 2016 Kumamoto earthquakes. The campaign, titled "GO!GO!! Kis-My Kumamoto Ōita," included sightseeing commercials featuring the group, as well as special wrapping trains such as the "Kis-My-Ft2 Shinkansen" and "Kis-My-Ft2 Sonic," which operated throughout the Kyushu region.

By the mid-2010s, the group had completed multiple dome tours. Alongside music activities, they expanded into television, radio, and variety programming, further expanding their presence in mainstream media. Sub-unit activities (舞祭組 (Busaiku)) and individual member projects were also introduced during this period.

=== Continued prominence and expanded activities (2018–2022) ===
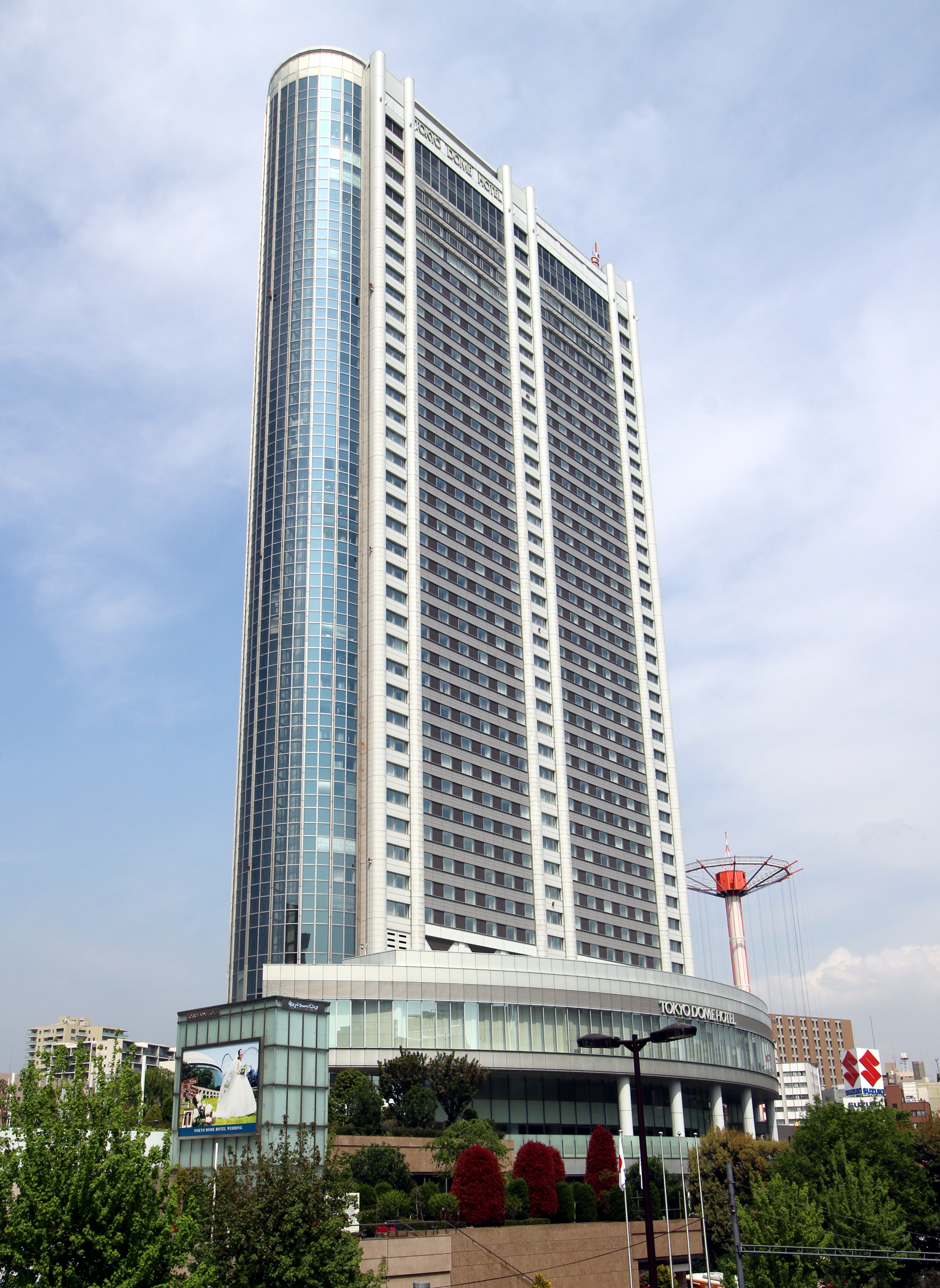
Tokyo Dome Hotel, used as the location for the encore performance of Kis-My-Ft2’s 2020 no-audience live-streamed concert, where they sang "Endless Summer".

From the late 2010s onward, Kis-My-Ft2 maintained commercial success through consecutive album releases and large-scale dome tours. During this period, their activities also expanded beyond Japan, including overseas performances and music videos filmed abroad. On 30 November 2019, the group made their first overseas performance at the Asia Fashion Award 2019 held in Taipei, Taiwan. In the same year, they made their first appearance on NHK’s annual music program Kōhaku Uta Gassen, a milestone in their career.

From 2018 to 2020, Kis-My-Ft2 served as main personalities for Nippon Broadcasting System’s 24-hour charity program Radio Charity Musicthon, a fundraising broadcast supporting initiatives for visually impaired people. The group’s participation contributed to large-scale fundraising campaigns, and they later continued to appear in related broadcasts, including guest appearances in subsequent editions hosted by other personalities.

The COVID-19 pandemic led to the cancellation of scheduled tours in 2020; however, Kis-My-Ft2 adapted by holding live-streamed concerts, including a performance broadcast from Tokyo Dome without an in-person audience, allowing them to continue performing during restrictions.

In 2021, the group celebrated the 10th anniversary of their CD debut with the release of a compilation album and commemorative projects.

=== Lineup change and continuation as six members (2023–present) ===
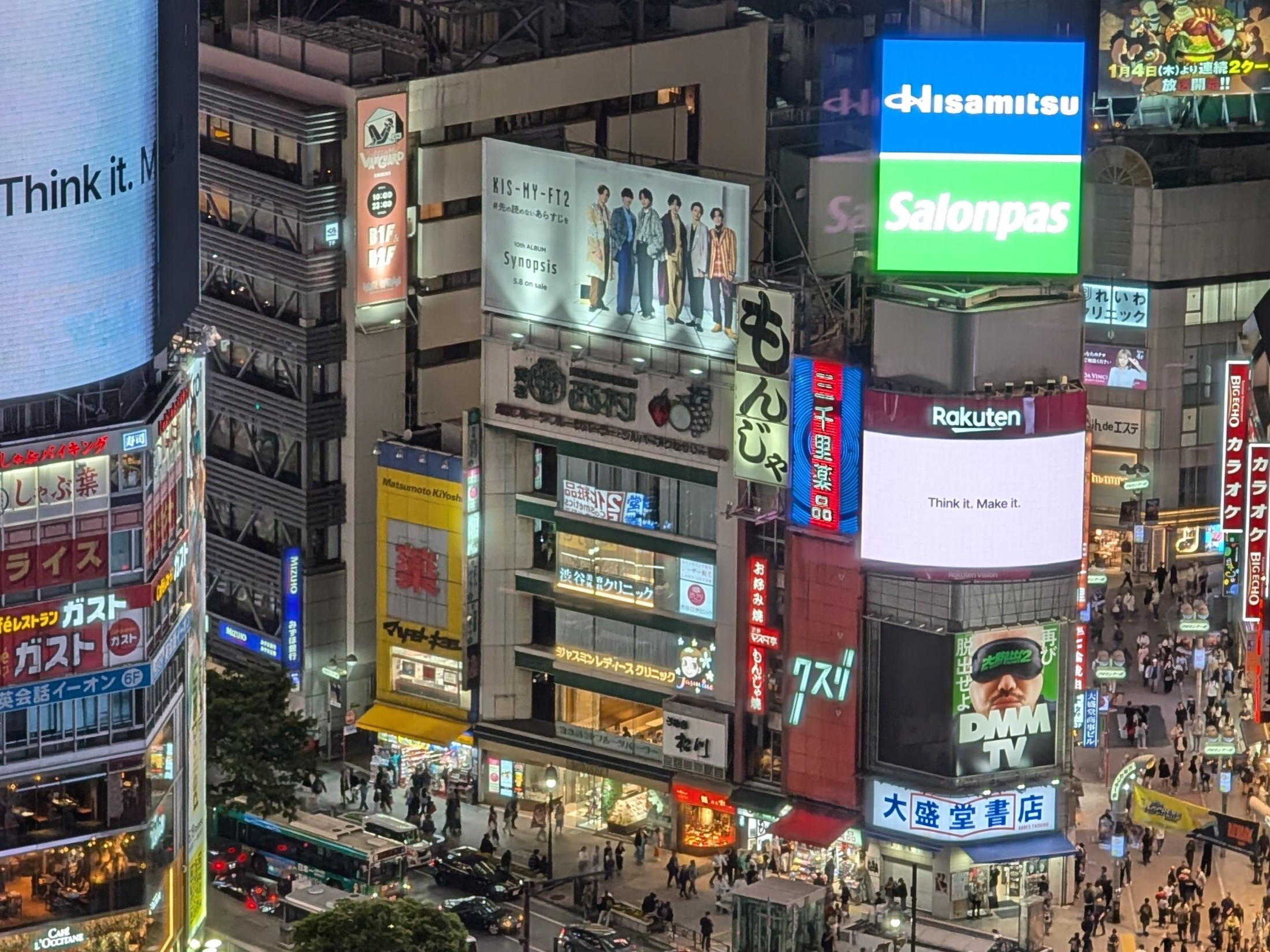
A cropped view of Shibuya Crossing in 2024, showing a Kis-My-Ft2 album Synopsis advertisement displayed on a building.

In August 2023, member Hiromitsu Kitayama departed from the group to pursue a solo career, after which Kis-My-Ft2 continued activities as a six-member unit. Kis-My-Ft2 subsequently continued activities as a six-member group, releasing new music and holding arena and dome tours. Around this period, the music video for the single "Tomoni" referenced locations associated with the group’s earlier activities, serving as a retrospective reflection on their history as a seven-member act.

In 2024, all members of the group participated in relief support activities following the 2024 Noto earthquake, taking part in charity food distribution efforts as part of broader aid initiatives.

During the promotion of the 2024 dome tour, member Takashi Nikaido temporarily suspended activities due to health issues, resulting in the single "Curtain Call" being promoted by the remaining five members. He later returned to group activities.

Releases as a six-member unit achieved commercial success, including chart-topping albums in the mid-2020s onward. The group remains active, continuing large-scale live performances and expanding their presence across digital and streaming platforms.

In 2026, marking their 15th anniversary, the group announced a series of anniversary activities, including the monthly digital release of new songs beginning with "UNISON" and the planning of an arena tour. Additional commemorative projects and performances were announced as part of the group’s anniversary year.

== Performance style and reception ==
Commentary on Kis-My-Ft2 has frequently focused on the visual continuity of their stage performances within the performance tradition established by Johnny & Associates, particularly the use of roller skates. Japanese media have described this element as a reinterpretation of earlier performance styles adapted for contemporary large-scale concerts.

Reviews of the group’s live shows have emphasized concerts as a central mode of expression, highlighting large-scale staging, choreography, and ensemble coordination. Such assessments have positioned Kis-My-Ft2 as a group whose identity is closely associated with live performance as a collective experience rather than individual display.

Media coverage has also highlighted the involvement of individual members in concert production, including Takashi Nikaido’s contributions to stage effects and visual presentation, Yuta Tamamori’s role in developing stage costumes—an activity later documented in the Amazon Prime Video documentary Yuta Tamamori Mode—and Kento Senga’s participation in choreography as part of a collaborative internal production process.

== Media and variety activities ==
=== Television variety programs ===
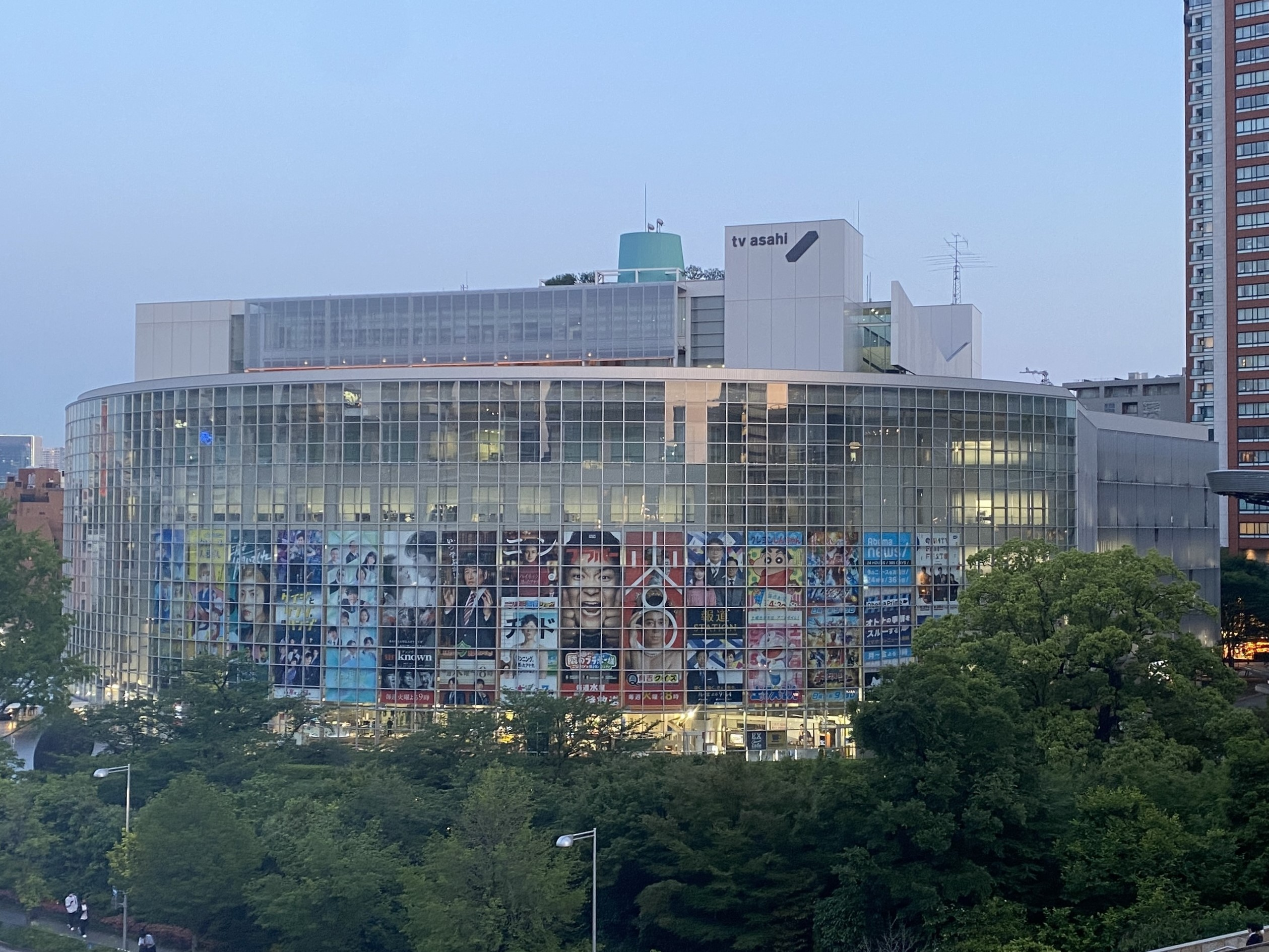
TV Asahi headquarters in Tokyo, where several long-running variety programs featuring Kis-My-Ft2 were broadcast.

Following their debut, Kis-My-Ft2 became active in variety programming through a long-running series of programs on TV Asahi that began with 濱キス (Hama Kiss). Originally featuring comedian Masaru Hamaguchi as a partner, the program continued under different titles while maintaining a similar format. Since 2017, the comedy duo Sandwichman have been regular collaborators, and the series expanded from late-night broadcasting to prime-time slots, reflecting the group’s growing television presence. The collaboration between Kis-My-Ft2 and Sandwichman continued beyond the program itself, including appearances together in later music video projects.

Another major variety program was Kis-My-Busaiku!?, which began regular broadcasting on Fuji TV in 2013 and became known for its comedic ranking format. The show concluded in 2023 around the time of member Hiromitsu Kitayama’s departure, marking the end of one of the group’s longest-running variety projects.

=== Early group structure ===
Beyond their television activities, media coverage and interviews have also discussed internal dynamics within the group during their early years. In interviews and variety programs, members frequently described an early internal division between the three front members—Hiromitsu Kitayama, Taisuke Fujigaya, and Yuta Tamamori—and the four members later known as Busaiku (Wataru Yokoo, Toshiya Miyata, Takashi Nikaido, and Kento Senga). Media coverage also reported differences in promotional focus during this period, including accounts of limited appearances in music videos and other media exposure for some members.

This distinction was reflected visually in stage performances, music videos, and promotional materials, where coordinated costume colors, positioning, and screen time differentiated the two groups during the early years. Subsequent projects such as the formation of the spin-off unit Busaiku, produced by SMAP member Masahiro Nakai, provided additional opportunities for the latter members, and later interviews suggested that these differences gradually diminished over time.

== Group activities ==
=== TV variety shows ===
==== NHK ====
- The Shounen Club (2005 – 2012, NHK BS Premium) – until 5 August 2011 episode, the members appeared under the name of Johnny's Jr.
- The Shounen Club Premium (2019 – 2023, NHK BS Premium) – MC

==== TV Asahi ====
- Hama Kiss (one-off: 2011 and 2012, regular: April 2012 – September 2012)
- Kiss Hama Learning / Kiss Hama Learning 2 / Kiss Hama Learning 3 (2012 – 2014)
- Kiss Hama TV (April 2014 – September 2014)
- Kis-My-Ft2 presents Office Learning Variety OL Club (September 2014 – March 2015)
- Upgrading that game! Kis-My-Game (March 2015 – September 2015)
- Kis-My-Magic (October 2015 – September 2016,)
- Kis-Mileage (October 2016 – September 2017)
- 100,000 Yen de Dekirukana (10万円でできるかな) (October 2017 - March 2026)
- Sand & Kis-My-Ft2 no Ki ni Naru Man (サンド&キスマイの気になるマン) (April 2026 -)

==== Fuji Television ====
- Kis-My-Busaiku!? (one-off: August and September 2012, January, February and March 2013; regular: April – September 2017)
- Kis-My-Super-Busaiku!? (6 October 2017 – 29 September 2023)
- Moshi Mo Tours (2011 – 2022) – Several members appeared with Hannya, who also appeared regularly on the show, in rotation each week.

==== TBS Television ====
- Kiss My Fake (2013 – 2014)

==== Some members appear ====
- Black and White Judge Variety: Masahiro Nakai's Library of Suspicious Rumors (2011 – 2013, TV Asahi) – Several members appeared on the show one by one.
- Tokai Region no Kototo Narunaru Chikara Chosashimasu! (2012, Chubu-Nippon Broadcasting, Chukyo local) – several members appeared on the program
- Masahiro Nakai Presents: Useful Public Libraries (2013 – 2017, TV Asahi)
- Masahiro Nakai Presents: Library of Concern (2017 – 2019, TV Asahi)
- Go! Go! NinJapon (Season 1: 2018 – end of broadcast, Season 2: 2019 – end of broadcast, Season 3: 2020 – end of broadcast, co-produced by eight local Japan News Network-affiliated stations) – Two of Yokoo, Miyata, Nikaido, and Senga appear in rotation.
- Prevato! (Mainichi Broadcasting System) – Yokoo, Senga, Kitayama, Miyata, and Nikaido appear irregularly in the haiku corner.

=== TV special programs ===
- FNS 27-Hour TV Festival! ( 23 and 24 July 2016, Fuji TV) – MC Relay
- Can Kis-My-Ft2 Do It? – 10th Anniversary Special (21 September 2020, TV Asahi) – MC Relay- TV Asahi
- Geinōjin Kakuzuke Check (Celebrity Rating Check) (1 January 2025; 1 January 2026, ABC TV)

=== Streamed programs ===
- Kis-My Doki Doki (2019 – 2021, Lemino(dTV))
- Kis-My Time Tunnel (2021, Lemino(dTV))
- Kis-My Doki Doki! presents "Shabekuru Kiss Night" (2022 [3 episodes], Lemino(dTV))

=== Stage shows ===
==== Theatre ====
- Playzone 2005 20th Anniversary Twenty Years ... and into the future we have yet to see (6 July – 4 August 2005, Aoyama Theatre / 13–17 August 2005, Festival Hall)
- Johnnys Theater "SDAUIMJIMAASRTY2005" (26 July – 4 September 2005, Shinagawa Prince Stellar Ball)
- Dream Boys(2006) ( 3–29 January 2006, Inperial Theatre)
- Takizawa Enbujo (7 March – 25 April 2006, Shinbashi Enbujō)
- One! -the history of Tackey- (September 2006, Nissay Theatre)
- Dream Boys (2007) (September 2007, Imperial Theatre)
- Takizawa Enbujo 2007 ( 3–29 July 2007, Shinbashi Enbujō)
- World's Wing Tsubasa Premium 2007 ( 3–28 October 2007, Nissay Theatre)
- Dream Boys (2008) ( 4–30 March 2008, Imperial Theatre / 4–16 April 2008, Umeda Arts Theater)
- Summary 2008 (2 August – 5 September 2008, Johnnys Theater)
- New Year Takizawa Revolution ( 1–27 January 2009, Imperial Theatre)
- Playzone 2009: A Letter From The Sun (11 July – 9 August 2009, Aoyama Theatre / 21–26 August 2009, Umeda Arts Theater)
- New Year Takizawa Revolution (1 January – 5 February 2010, Imperial Theatre)
- New Year: Life Revolution (8 January – 6 February 2010, Imperial Theatre)
- Boys: Prison without Bars ( 3–26 September 2010, Nissay Theatre) – starring with A.B.C-Z
- Takizawa Kabuki (8 April – 8 May 2011, Nissay Theatre) – Yokoo, Senga, Miyata, Nikaido
- Teigeki Johnnys Imperial Theatre Special "Kis-My-Ft2 with Johnny's Jr." ( 27–29 September 2011, Imperial Theatre)
- Johnny's Ginza You no Mae ni Me ga Mae ni iru! ( 27–30 April 2012, Theater Creation) – Senga, Miyata, Nikaido, Yokoo

==== Festivals ====
- Kanofes 2026 – Sendai Sun Plaza Hall, Sendai (14–15 February 2026)

=== Youtube ===
- They opened an official YouTube channel on 10 April 2022 and released their music videos. Since September 2023, they have been distributing variety videos every Saturday.

=== Radio ===
- Kis-My-Ft2 Kismy Radio (Kis-My-Ft2 キスマイRadio) – (October 2011– ) – Nippon Cultural Broadcasting
- All Night Nippon series (Nippon Broadcasting System, Inc.)
  - Kis-My-Ft2's All Night Nippon GOLD (2019)
  - Kis-My-Ft2's All Night Nippon (2021)
  - Kis-My-Ft2's All Night Nippon Premium
    - Kis-My-Ft2's All Night Nippon Premium (2018 – 2019) – Friday personality
    - Kis-My-Ft2's All Night Nippon Premium (2019 – 2020) – Saturday personality
    - Kis-My-Ft2's All Night Nippon Premium (2020 - 2021)
    - Kis-My-Ft2's All Night Nippon Premium (2020 – 2021) – Saturday personality
- Radio Charity Musicthon (Nippon Broadcasting System, Inc.)
  - The 44th Radio Charity Musicthon (2018)
  - The 45th Radio Charity Musicthon (2019)
  - The 46th Radio Charity Musicthon (2020) - Co-chair with SixTones
  - The 51st Radio Charity Musicthon (2025) — Miyata, Tamamori, and Nikaido (guests)

== Awards ==
Years	Awards	Work	Department	Result
2011	26th Japan Gold Disc Awards	Kis-My-Ft2	New artist of the year 2011 (Japanese music section)	Won
2021	107th The Television Drama Academy Awards	Oh My Boss! Love not included	Drama song Luv Bias	Won
2021	LINE News Awards 2021		the Hottest People Award in the idol category	Won

== Discography ==
Kis-My-Ft2 discography
- Studio albums: 12
- Compilation albums: 2
- Singles: 33
- Video albums: 16

=== Singles ===
==== CD singles ====
List of singles, with selected chart positions
	Title	Year	Peak chart positions						Sales	Certifications	Album
	Title	Year	JPN Oricon	JPN Hot	KOR	KOR Int. (Note: References for Gaon: "Everybody Go", Kis-My-1st. References for Gaon Overseas: "Everybody Go", Kis-My-1st.)	TWN	TWN EA (Note: Position was taken from 2011 week 33 for "Everybody Go", 2011 week 51 for "We Never Give Up", 2012 week 12 for "She Her Her", 2012 week 34 for "Wanna Beeee!!!/Shake It Up", 2012 week 46 for "Ai no Beat", 2014 week 10 for "My Resistance", 2014 week 12 for "Ki su u ma i (Kiss Your Mind)/SOS (Smile On Smile)", 2013 week 33 for "Kimi to no Kiseki", 2013 week 47 for "Snow Dome no Yakusoku/Luv Sick".)	Sales	Certifications	Album
1	"Everybody Go"	2011	1	1	50	8	14	2	451,000	RIAJ (physical): Platinum	Kis-My-1st
2	"We Never Give Up!"	2011	1	1	—	—	—	6	329,000	RIAJ (physical): Platinum	Kis-My-1st
3	"She! Her! Her!"	2012	1	1	—	—	15	7	244,000	RIAJ (physical): Platinum	Kis-My-1st
4	"Wanna Beeee!!!"	2012	1	1	—	—	—	6	374,000	RIAJ (physical): Platinum	Good Ikuze!
4	"Shake It Up"	2012	1	—	—	—	—	6	374,000	RIAJ (physical): Platinum	Good Ikuze!
5	"Ai no Beat"	2012	1	1	—	—	—	7	322,000	RIAJ (physical): Platinum	Good Ikuze!
6	"My Resistance (Tashika na Mono)/Unmei Girl"	2013	1	1	—	—	—	9	379,000	RIAJ (physical): Platinum	Good Ikuze!
6	"My Resistance (Tashika na Mono)/Unmei Girl"	2013	1	—	—	—	—	9	379,000	RIAJ (physical): Platinum	Good Ikuze!
7	"Kiss U Mai (Kiss Your Mind) / S.O.S. (Smile on Smile)"	2013	1	1	—	—	—	3	270,000	RIAJ (physical): Platinum	Hit! Hit! Hit!
7	"Kiss U Mai (Kiss Your Mind) / S.O.S. (Smile on Smile)"	2013	1	—	—	—	—	3	270,000	RIAJ (physical): Platinum	Hit! Hit! Hit!
8	"Kimi to no Kiseki"	2013	1	1	—	—	18	5	312,000	RIAJ (physical): Platinum	Hit! Hit! Hit!
9	"Snow Dome no Yakusoku"	2013	1	1	—	—	—	4	338,000	RIAJ (physical): Platinum	Hit! Hit! Hit!
9	"Luv Sick"	2013	1	—	—	—	—	4	338,000	RIAJ (physical): Platinum	Hit! Hit! Hit!
10	"Hikari no Signal"	2014	1	1	—	—	—	—	245,000	RIAJ (physical): Platinum	Kis-My-Journey
11	"Another Future"	2014	1	1	—	—	—	—	265,000	RIAJ (physical): Platinum	Kis-My-World
12	"Thank You!"	2014	1	1	—	—	—	—	475,000	RIAJ (physical): 2× Platinum	Kis-My-World
13	"Kiss Damashii"	2015	1	1	—	—	—	—	356,000	RIAJ (physical): Platinum	Kis-My-World
14	"AAO"	2015	1	1	—	—	—	—	212,000	RIAJ (physical): Gold	I Scream
15	"Saigo mo Yappari Kimi"	2015	1	1	—	—	—	—	206,000	RIAJ (physical): Gold	I Scream
16	"Gravity"	2016	1	1	—	—	—	—	239,000	RIAJ (physical): Platinum	I Scream
17	"Sha la la Summer Time"	2016	1	1	—	—	—	—	291,000	RIAJ (physical): Platinum	Music Colosseum
18	"Inter"	2017	1	1 (Note: Peak position for "Tonight".)	—	—	—	—	227,000	RIAJ (physical): Platinum	Music Colosseum
19	"Pick It Up"	2017	1	1	—	—	—	—	200,000	RIAJ (physical): Gold	Yummy!!
20	"Akai Kajitsu"	2017	1	1	—	—	—	—	194,000	RIAJ (physical): Gold	Yummy!!
SP	"You & Me" (Note: Limited release. Sales of "You & Me" did not count towards Oricon charts.)	2018	—	—	—	—	—	—	No aggregation		Best of Kis-My-Ft2 (Home)
21	"Love"	2018	1	1	—	—	—	—	198,000	RIAJ (physical): Gold	Free Hugs!
22	"Kimi, Boku"	2018	1	1	—	—	—	—	213,000	RIAJ (physical): Gold	Free Hugs!
23	"Kimi wo Daisuki da"	2019	1	1	—	—	—	—	318,738	RIAJ (physical): Platinum	Free Hugs!
24	"Hands Up"	2019	1	1	—	—	—	—	196,400	RIAJ (physical): Gold	To-y2
25	"Edge of Days"	2019	1	1	—	—	—	—	167,050	RIAJ (physical): Gold	To-y2
26	"Endless Summer"	2020	1		—	—	—	—	184,000	RIAJ (physical): Gold	Best of Kis-My-Ft2
27	"Luv Bias"	2021	1	1	—	—	—	—	214,000	RIAJ (physical): Platinum	Best of Kis-My-Ft2
28	"Fear/So Blue"	2021	1		—	—	—	—	130,000	RIAJ (physical): Gold	Synopsis
29	"Two as One"	2022	1		—	—	—	—	246,000	RIAJ (physical): Platinum	Synopsis
30	"Omoibana"	2022	1		—	—	—	—	243,000	RIAJ (physical): Platinum	Synopsis
SP	"Tomoni"	2023	—	—	—	—	—	—	No aggregation		Not included
31	"Heartbreaker"	2024	1	—	—	—	—	—	201,000	RIAJ (physical): Platinum	Synopsis
31	"C'monova"	2024	1	—	—	—	—	—	201,000	RIAJ (physical): Platinum	Synopsis
32	"Curtain Call"	2025	1	4	—	—	—	—	117,000	RIAJ (physical): Gold	Magfact
33	"&Joy"	2025	1	2	—	—	—	—	91,082	RIAJ (physical): Gold	

==== Digital singles ====
List of singles
Release year	Release date	Title	Notes	Album
2025	14 April	"Glory Days"	Pre-release from Magfact	Magfact
2025	21 April	"Otsukaresama Desu! feat. Sandwichman"	Pre-release single from Magfact	Magfact
2025	11 August	"A Cha Cha Cha"	Official music video on YouTube	TBA
2025	12 November	"&Joy"	Pre-release single	TBA
2026	11 February	"Unison"	Official audio on YouTube	TBA
2026	6 April	"Heartloud"	Opening theme for the TV anime Mao; Official music video on YouTube	TBA
2026	25 April	"Yoru no Mukō e" (Beyond the Night)		TBA
2026	26 May	"Couture"		TBA
2026	26 July	"HB2U"		TBA

==== Promotional singles ====
Title	Year	Peak chart positions	Album
Title	Year	Billboard Japan Hot 100	Album
"Seven Journey"	2014	93	Kis-My-Journey

=== Studio albums ===
List of albums, with selected chart positions
Title	Album details	Peak positions					Sales	Certifications
Title	Album details	JPN	KOR	KOR Int.	TWN (Note: The G-Music chart was established in July 2005 and only archives the top 20 releases.) (Note: Position was taken from 2012 week 13 for Kis-My-1st, 2013 week 15 for Good Ikuze.)	TWN EA (Note: Position was taken from 2014 week 12 for Kis-My-1st and Good Ikuze, 2014 week 41 for Kis-My-Journey.)	Sales	Certifications
Kis-My-1st	Released: 28 March 2012; Label: Avex Trax; Formats: CD, CD/DVD	1	84	9	11	3	349,000	RIAJ: Platinum
Good Ikuze!	Released: 27 March 2013; Label: Avex Trax; Formats: CD, CD/DVD	1	—	—	20	3	282,000	RIAJ: Platinum
Kis-My-Journey	Released: 2 July 2014; Label: Avex Trax; Formats: CD, CD/DVD	1	—	—	—	8	288,000	RIAJ: Platinum
Kis-My-World	Released: 1 July 2015; Label: Avex Trax; Formats: CD, CD/DVD	1	—	—	—	—	336,000	RIAJ: Platinum
I Scream	Released: 22 June 2016; Label: Avex Trax; Formats: CD, CD/DVD	1	—	—	—	—	281,000	RIAJ: Platinum
Music Colosseum	Released: 3 May 2017; Label: Avex Trax; Formats: CD, CD/DVD	1	—	—	—	—	245,000	RIAJ: Platinum
Yummy!!	Released: 23 April 2018; Label: Avex Trax; Formats: CD, CD/DVD	1	—	—	—	—	251,000	RIAJ: Platinum
Free Hugs!	Released: 24 April 2019; Label: Avex Trax; Formats: CD, CD/DVD	1	—	—	—	—	204,000	RIAJ: Gold
To-y2	Released: 25 March 2020; Label: Avex Trax; Formats: CD, CD/DVD	1	—	—	—	—	190,500	RIAJ: Gold
Synopsis	Released: 8 May 2024; Label: MENT Recording; Formats: CD, CD/DVD, CD/Blu-ray	1	—	—	—	—	125,971	RIAJ: Gold
Magfact	Released: 21 May 2025; Label: MENT Recording; Formats: CD, CD/DVD, CD/Blu-ray	1	—	—	—	—	308,548	RIAJ: Platinum
Kis Scene	Released: 28 October 2026; Label: MENT Recording; Formats: CD, CD/DVD, CD/Blu-ray	1	—	—	—	—	321,545	RIAJ: Platinum

=== Compilation albums ===
List of compilation albums, with selected chart positions
Title	Album details	Peak positions	Sales	Certifications
Title	Album details	JPN	Sales	Certifications
Hit! Hit! Hit!	Released: 26 March 2014; Label: Avex Trax; Formats: CD, CD/2DVD	1	295,000	RIAJ: Platinum
Best of Kis-My-Ft2	Released: 10 August 2021; Label: Avex Trax; Format: 3CD+2DVD or Blu-ray (Limited Edition A), 3CD+DVD or Blu-ray (Limited Edition B), 2CD+DVD or Blu-ray (Regular Edition), and 2CD+GOODS (Seven Net Limited Edition)	1	247,000	RIAJ: Platinum

=== Video albums ===
List of media, with selected chart positions
Title	Album details	Peak positions		Certifications
Title	Album details	JPN	TWN (Note: Position was taken from 2011 week 45 for Kis-My-Ft ni Aeru, 2012 week 27 for Kis-My-Mint, 2013 week 15 for Yoshio: New Member.)	Certifications
Kis-My-Ft ni Aeru de Show Vol. 3 at Kokuritsu Yoyogi Daiichi Taiikukan 2011.2.12	Released: 26 October 2011 (DVD) / 7 January 2015 (Blu-ray); Label: Avex Trax; Formats: DVD / Blu-ray	2	3 (Note: Charted together as a set in Taiwan.)	RIAJ: Gold (Note: Also sold together as a 2DVD packaged set.)
Kis-My-Ft2 Debut Tour 2011 Everybody Go at Yokohama Arena	Released: 26 October 2011 (DVD) / 7 January 2015 (Blu-ray); Label: Avex Trax; Formats: DVD / Blu-ray	1	3	RIAJ: Gold
Kis-My-Mint Tour at Tokyo Dome 2012.4.8	Released: 20 June 2012 (DVD) / 7 January 2015 (Blu-ray); Label: Avex Trax; Formats: DVD / Blu-ray	1	2	RIAJ: Gold
Yoshio: New Member	Released: 27 March 2013; Label: Avex Trax; Formats: DVD	1	10	—
Snow Dome no Yakusoku in Tokyo Dome 2013.11.16	Released: 29 January 2014 (DVD) / 7 January 2015 (Blu-ray); Label: Avex Trax; Formats: DVD / Blu-ray	1	—	RIAJ: Gold
2014 Concert Tour Kis-My-Journey	Released: 4 February 2015; Label: Avex Trax; Formats: DVD / Blu-ray	1	—	RIAJ: Platinum
2015 Concert Tour Kis-My-World	Released: 20 January 2016; Label: Avex Trax; Formats: DVD / Blu-ray	1	—	RIAJ: Platinum
Concert Tour 2016 I Scream	Released: 21 December 2016; Label: Avex Trax; Formats: DVD / Blu-ray	1	—	RIAJ: Platinum
Live Tour 2017 Music Colosseum	Released: 31 January 2018; Label: Avex Trax; Formats: DVD / Blu-ray	1	—	RIAJ: Gold
Live Tour 2018 Yummy! ! you&me	Released: 28 November 2018; Label: Avex Trax; Formats: DVD / Blu-ray	1	—	RIAJ: Gold
Live Tour 2019 Free Hugs!	Released: 11 December 2019; Label: Avex Trax; Formats: DVD / Blu-ray	1	—	RIAJ: Gold
Kis-My-Ft2 Live Tour 2020 To-y2	Released: 20 January 2021; Label: Avex Trax; Formats: DVD / Blu-ray	1	—	RIAJ: Gold
Live Tour 2021 Home	Released: 15 December 2021; Label: Avex Trax; Formats: DVD / Blu-ray	1	—	RIAJ: Gold
Kis-My-Ft ni aeru de Show 2022 in DOME	Released: 1 March 2023; Label: MENT Recording; Formats: DVD / Blu-ray	1	—	RIAJ: Gold
For dear life	Released: 7 August 2024; Label: MENT Recording; Formats: DVD / Blu-ray	1	—	—
Kis-My-Ft2 Dome Tour 2024 Synopsis	Released: 5 March 2025; Label: MENT Recording; Formats: DVD / Blu-ray	1	—	—

==== Other DVDs ====
- [2007.07.18] Takizawa Hideaki – Takizawa Embujo
- [2008.01.23] Takizawa Hideaki – One! -the history of Tackey-
- [2008.02.27] Dream Boys
- [2009.12.02] Play Zone 2009 Taiyo Kara no Tegami
- [2010.03.10] Takizawa Hideaki – Shinshun Takizawa Kakumei

=== Pre-debut songs ===
- "Sennen no Love Song" (千年のLove Song) (Originally belonged to K.K.Kity)
- "Endless Road"
- "TRY AGAIN"
- "Inori" (祈り)
- "Ready?"
- "Kis-My-Me-Mine"
- "Good-bye, Thank You"
- "FIRE BEAT"
- "Brand New Season"
- "Kaizoku" (海賊)
- "Smile"
- "Daybreaker" (with A.B.C.-Z)
- "Kis-My-Calling!"
- "Hair"
- "Ame" (雨)
- "Tension" (テンション)
- "SHOOTING STARS"
- "Kis-My-LAND"
- "Eien no Ticket" (永遠のチケット)
- "My Love"
- "3D Girl"

== Concerts ==
=== Joint and independent concerts ===
Year	Title	Schedule	Number of stage	Place	Note
Joint concerts
2008	A.B.C-Z Kis-My-Ft2 First Concert in Yokohama Arena	11–13 October 2008	5 stages	Yokohama Arena	
2008	A.B.C-Z Kis-My-Ft2 First Concert 2nd Encore Show!	8–9 November 2008	3 stages	Yoyogi First Gymnasium	
Independent concerts
2009	Kis-My-Ft ni aeru de Show	3 October 2009 – 20 December 2009	31 stages	Ōita iichiko Guranshiata, Kagoshima Citizen's Cultural Hall, Sendai IZUMITY 21, Well City Kanazawa, Niigata Prefectural Civic Center, Well City Hiroshima, World Memorial Hall, Well City Sapporo, Yokohama Arena, Nippon Gaishi Hall	
2010	Kis-My-Ft ni 010 aeru de Show	30 March 2010 – 5 May 2010	12 stages	Yokohama Arena、Marine Messe Fukuoka, Sekisui Heim Super Arena, Hokkaido Prefectural Sports Center(Kitayell), Hiroshima Green Arena, Osaka-jō Hall	
2010–2011	Kis-My-Ft ni aeru de Show vol.3	28 December 2010 – 12 February 2011	10 stages	Nippon Gaishi Hall, Osaka-jō Hall, Yoyogi First Gymnasium	
2011	Kis-My-Ft2 Debut Tour 2011 Everybody Go	9 July 2011 – 21 August 2011	16 stages	Hokkaido Prefectural Sports Center(Kitayell), Hiroshima Green Arena, Yokohama Arena, Marine Messe Fukuoka, Osaka-jō Hall, Nippon Gaishi Hall	
2011	Kis-My-Ft2 Debut Tour 2011 Everybody Go to TOKYO DOME	28 August 2011	1 stage	Tokyo Dome	
2012	Kis-My-Ft2 Kis-My-MiNT Tour	31 March 2012 – 3 June 2012	19 stages	Marine Messe Fukuoka, Nippon Gaishi Hall, Tokyo Dome, Osaka-jō Hall, Hiroshima Green Arena, Hokkaido Prefectural Sports Center(Kitayell)	
2013	Kis-My-Ft2 Good Live Tour Ikuze!	3 May 2013 – 25 August 2013	16 stages	Osaka-jō Hall, Sekisui Heim Super Arena, Hiroshima Green Arena, Yokohama Arena, Hokkaido Prefectural Sports Center(Kitayell), Marine Messe Fukuoka	
2013	Kis-My-Ft2 Snow Dome no Yakusoku In Tokyo Dome / Osaka Dome	15–16 November, 14 –15 December	4 stages	Tokyo Dome, Osaka Dome	
2014	2014 Concert Tour Kis-My-Journey	5 July – 9 November 2014	10 stages	Osaka Dome, Fukuoka Yafuoku! Dome, Tokyo Dome, Nagoya Dome	
2015	2015 Concert Tour Kis-My-World	29 August – 29 October 2015	11 stages	Osaka Dome, Fukuoka Yafuoku! Dome, Tokyo Dome, Nagoya Dome	
2016	Kis-My-Ft2 Concert Tour 2016 I Scream	1 July – 14 August 2016	11 stages	Osaka Dome, Fukuoka Yafuoku! Dome, Tokyo Dome, Nagoya Dome	
2017	Kis-My-Ft2 Live Tour 2017 Music Colosseum	13 May – 27 August 2017	31 stages	Toki Messe Niigata Convention Center, Shizuoka Ecopa Arena, Sapporo Makomanai Sekisui Heim Ice Arena, Hiroshima Green Arena, Nagoya Nippon Gaishi Sports Plaza – Gaishi Hall, Osaka-jō Hall (Osaka Castle Hall), Marine Messe Fukuoka, Yokohama Arena, Miyagi Sekisui Heim Super Arena	
2018	Kis-My-Ft2 Live Tour 2018 Yummy!! you&me	5 May 2018 – 16 July 2018	13 stages	Nagoya Dome, Fukuoka Yahoo! Auctions Dome, Tokyo Dome, Kyocera Dome Osaka, MET Life Dome	
2019	Kis-My-Ft2 Live Tour 2019 FREE HUGS!	Mat 6, 2019 - 14 July 2019	13 stages	Tokyo Dome, MET Life Dome, Nagoya Dome, Fukuoka Yahoo! Auctions Dome, Kyocera Dome Osaka	
2020	Kis-My-Ft2 LIVE TOUR 2020 To-y2	3–4 October 2020	2 stages	Streeming from Tokyo Dome	
2021	Kis-My-Ft2 Live Tour 2021 Home	14 May 2021 – 16 May 2021	3 stages	Streeming from Belluna Dome	
2022	Kis-My-Ft ni Aeru de Show 2022 (in arena)	15 January 2022 – 10 April 2022	31 stages (12 stages cancelled)	Shizuoka Ecopa Arena, Maruzen Intec Arena Osaka, Kanagawa Pia Arena MM, (Tokyo* Yoyogi National Gymnasium), (Miyagi* Sekisui Heim Super Arena), (Aichi* Ngk Sports Plaza, Gaishi Hall), Hokkaido Makomanai Open Stadium, Sun Dome Fukui	*Tokyo, Miyagi and Aichi Performances canceled due to COVID-19 infection among performers
2022	Kis-My-Ft ni Aeru de Show 2022 in DOME	21 May 2022 – 11 August 2022	12 stages	Belluna Dome, Osaka Dome, Nagoya Dome, Tokyo Dome, Fukuoka Dome	
2023–2024	Kis-My-Ft2: For Dear Life	5 October 2023 – 15 February 2024	26 stages	Yokohama Arena, Ecopa Arena, Fukuoka Convention Center, Makomanai Ice Arena, Sekisui Heim Super Arena, Osaka Municipal Central Gymnasium (Osaka City Central Gymnasium), NGK Sports Plaza Gaishi Hall, Yoyogi National Gymnasium	
2024	Kis-My-Ft2 Dome Tour 2024 Synopsis	8 June 2024 – 8 September 2024	7 stages	Kyocera Dome Osaka, Tokyo Dome, Nagoya Dome	*Nikaido missed the final performance on 8 September due to health problems.
2025	Kis-My-Ft2 Live Tour 2025 Magfact	21 June 2025 – 14 September 2025	24 stages	LaLa Arena Tokyo Bay, Marine Messe Fukuoka Hall A, Sekisui Heim Super Arena, Osaka-jō Hall, Yokohama Arena, Ecopa Arena, Aichi Sky Expo Hall A, Makomanai Sekisui Heim Ice Arena	

=== Other Concerts ===
- The Great Adventure of Johnny's Jr ( 15–24 August 2006, Hotel Grand Pacific Meridian)
- Your Music Sports Day (30 September – 1 October 2006, Yoyogi National Gymnasium)
- 2007 Happy New Year, a large gathering of Johnny's Jr. ( 2–7 January 2007 Nippon Budokan)
- The Great Adventure of Johnny's Jr ( 15–24 August 2007, Hotel Grand Pacific Meridian)
- Hiroki Uchihiro New Year's Eve Rock 'n' Roll Friends Gathering ( 20–21 December 2008, Yokohama Arena)
- Hiroki Uchi Uchi-Hirocky (7 March – 4 April 2009, 3 cities)
- KAT-TUN World Big Tour ( 16–25 July 2010, Tokyo Dome / 6 & 7 August 2010, Olympic Gymnastics Arena / 21 & 22 August 2010, Kyocera Dome Osaka / 27 & 28 August 2010, Taipei Arena)
- Johnny's Festival -Thank you 2021 Hello 2022– (30 December 2021, Tokyo Dome)
- We Are! Let's get the party Starto! (10 April 2024, Tokyo Dome / 29 and 30 May, scheduled for Kyocera Dome Osaka)

== Cited Works ==
- Kis-My-Ft2 (19 July 2013). 裸の時代 [The Naked Era] (in Japanese). Text by Mitsuhiro Mizuno. Shueisha. ISBN 9784087806786.
