= To-y2 =

Toy-2

Studio album by Kis-My-Ft2
- Released: March 25, 2019
- Genre: J-pop
- Length: 83:27 (regular edition)
- Label: Avex Trax

Kis-My-Ft2 chronology
Free Hugs!! (2019)	Toy-2 (2019)	Best of Kis-My-Ft2 (2021)

Singles from Toy-2
- 1. "Hands Up (Kis-My-Ft2 song)" Released: July 10, 2019; 2. "Edge of Days" Released: November 13, 2019

Music videos
- "To Yours" on YouTube
- "Positive Man" on YouTube

To-y2 (read as "Toys") is the ninth original album by Japanese boy band Kis-My-Ft2, released on March 25, 2020, by Avex Trax.

== Outline ==
This album is filled with the idea of "playing together using the 'music = toy' produced by Kis-My-Ft2, sharing happiness and excitement, and enriching and coloring our lives. The entire album, including songs, videos, and special features, is full of playfulness, genre-less, and rich in variety.

The album was released in three formats: First edition A/B and regular edition.

The DVD included with the first pressing A includes the music video for the lead track "To Yours," the jacket booklet, a making-of video closely following the shooting of the music video, and off-shot footage from "ASIA FASHION AWARD 2019 in TAIPEI," the group's first overseas performance. The DVD included with the first edition B includes the original variety show "KIS-MY-TV ~Kiss My Real Sugoroku~". The standard edition includes the secret track "Seeds", and the bonus CD contains four unit songs. if you purchase all three forms at the same time, you will receive a visual card with a serial code on it on a first-come, first-served basis.

Kis-My-World" released in 2015, "I Scream" released in 2016, "Music Colosseum" released in 2017, "Yummy!!" released in 2018 released in 2018, "Free Hugs!" released in 2019, and the initials of the title of this work "To-y2" are connected to form "Kis-My-Ft2". Hiromitsu Kitayama would leave Johnny & Associates on August 31, 2023, and this would be the last album with the seven members.

== Package specifications ==
The album was released in three formats:

- First Edition A (CD&DVD) (AVCD-96465/B) -Newly shot jacket size booklet (26 pages)
- First Edition B (CD&DVD) (AVCD-96466/B) -Jacket size slit animation cards (7 kinds) with solo photos of each member are enclosed.

KIS-MY-TV" linked bonus "Kiss Mai Sugoroku" set is included.

- Regular Edition (2CD) (AVCD-96467-8)

== Chart performance ==
The album sold 191,000 copies in the first week and ranked No. 1 on the Oricon Album Ranking for the week of April 6, 2020. It was their 10th consecutive album to reach the top spot on the chart since their first album "Kis-My-1st".

== Track listing ==
=== CD ===
Normal Edition, First Press Edition A

- See that page for details on single songs.
1. "9th" Overture (inst.) [1:19].
2. To Yours [4:03].
3. Reallove [4:17].
4. HANDS UP [3:49] (Japanese only)
5. Letting Go [4:04].
6. Positive Man [3:25].
7. MAHARAJA [3:36].
8. Be alright [3:49].
9. My Place [4:20].
10. Edge of Days [3:58].
11. Make you mine [4:22] (Japanese only)
12. Sometime... [3:48].
13. memento [4:32].
14. COUNT 7EVEN (read: Count Seven) [5:02].
15. Smilest [4:46]/[4:55].
16. Seed [4:53].

=== Bonus CD ===
- Regular disc only
1. NO!NO! [3:11] - Yuta Tamamori, Takatsugu Nikaido
2. Bacteria [4:18] - Hiromitsu Kitayama, Taisuke Fujigaya
3. Ōkoku no Chō (lit. "Butterfly of the Kingdom") [3:09] - Wataru Yokoo, Kento Senga
4. Unmei (lit. "Destiny") [4:44] - Toshiya Miyata, Yuta Tamamori

=== DVD ===
- First Edition A
1. To Yours" MUSIC VIDEO
2. Making of "To-y2" MUSIC VIDEO
3. ASIA FASHION AWARD 2019 in TAIPEI" off-shot movie
  1. Everybody Go
  2. I Scream Night
- First Edition B
1. KIS-MY-TV -Kiss My Real Sugoroku
