= Luv Bias =

Single by Kis-My-Ft2

from the album Best of Kis-My-Ft2
- B-side: "Naked" (First edition A); "Original Color" (First Edition B); "Big Wave" (Regular Edition)
- Released: February 24, 2021 (Japan)
- Genre: J-pop
- Length: 3:05
- Label: Avex Trax
- Composers: Koudai Iwatsubo, Gustav Mared
- Lyricist: Koudai Iwatsubo

Kis-My-Ft2 singles chronology
"Endless Summer" (2020)	"Luv Bias" (2021)	"Fear/So Blue" (2021)

Music video
- "Luv Bias" on YouTube "Luv Bias" (Drama version) on YouTube "Luv Bias" (Live Version) on YouTube "Naked" (Live version) on YouTube

"Luv Bias" is Japanese boy band Kis-My-Ft2's 27th single, released on February 24, 2021, by Avex Trax.

"Luv Bias" is the theme song of TBS Television (Japan) Television series Oh My Boss! Love not included in which Yuta Tamamori was appeared. "Bigwave" is the commercial song for Unicharm's "Wave Super Hydrating Wet Sheet" featuring Yuta Tamamori, "Naked" is the theme song for dTV (Lemino)'s "Kiss My Dokidoki!" theme song and "Original Color" is a commercial song for "Tokyo Interior Furniture".

== Overview ==
"Luv Bias" is the theme song for the TBS Television (Japan) TV series Oh My Boss! Love not included starring Yuta Tamamori. The music video was shot in full CG and fantastically depicts a ray of light of "love" in a pessimistic world. The video was released on February 9, and on April 15, the number of views exceeded 10 million. It also won "the Drama Song Award" at "the 107th The Television Drama Academy Awards" announced in May.

The version of "Luv Bias (another)" included in the regular edition was a version with the members singing differently, and was performed live for the first time at "Live Tour 2021 Home". In the regular version, the climax of the song is sung by the entire group, but in this version, Tamamori alone sings the song. The song was performed for the first time in the TV series "Oh My Boss!", it was used in the scene where Junnosuke (played by Tamamori) drives his motorcycle to Nami, the heroine of this TV series (played by Mone Kamishiraishi) and this version was also performed on Fuji Television's "2021 FNS Song Festival Summer" broadcast on July 14, 2021. It was also included in the "10th Anniversary Extra -Special Edition-" distributed exclusively on Line Music to commemorate the release of the live DVD/Blu-ray "Live Tour 2021 Home" from December 15, 2021. It ranked No. 1 in the "Line Music Song Top 100 Daily Ranking".

The album was released in three forms: First edition A, B, and regular edition, with each form including a different coupling song. The First edition A includes a DVD with the music video of the title song and the making of the song. The First edition B will come with a DVD containing the original variety program "Kis-My-TV".

== Chart performance ==
The song ranked at No. 1 on the Oricon Weekly Singles Chart dated March 8, 2021. First-week sales reached 214,000 copies, surpassing the 184,000 sales of the previous single, "Endless Summer." It also brought the "number of consecutive No. 1 singles since their debut (1st)" to 27, tying with KAT-TUN for third place on the all-time list. With this No. 1 album, the "number of consecutive years of No. 1 singles since debut (1st)" reached 11 consecutive years from FY2011 to the current fiscal year (FY2021).It reached No. 28 on the annual Oricon singles ranking in 2021. The single also debuted at No. 1 overall on Billboard Japan Hot 100 dated March 8, 2021.

== Track listing ==
=== CD ===
- Regular Edition
1. "Luv Bias" (3:05)
2. "Big Wave" (3:43)
3. "Luv Bias (another)" (3:05)
4. "Luv Bias" (piano & strings) (2:52)
5. "Luv Bias" (Instrumental) (3:07) (instrumental version used in the TV series)
- First Edition A
1. "Luv Bias"
2. "Naked" (3:15)
- First Edition B
1. "Luv Bias"
2. "Original Color" (3:43)

=== DVD ===
- First Edition A
1. "Luv Bias" Music video
2. "Luv Bias" Music video making document
- First Edition B
1. Kis-My-TV (Funny Sports)

== Package specifications ==
- First edition A (CD & DVD) (AVCD-94990/B): CD+DVD
- First edition B (CD & DVD) (AVCD-94991/B): CD+DVD
- Regular Edition (AVCD-94992): CD
