= Everybody Go =

Single by Kis-My-Ft2

from the album Kis-My-1st
- B-side: "S.O.Kiss"; "Kiss For U"
- Released: August 10, 2011 (Japan)
- Genre: J-pop
- Length: 4:42
- Label: Avex Trax
- Composers: Samuel Waermö; Stefan Åberg; Octobar
- Lyricist: Joya Uenaka (The Inazuma Sentai)

Kis-My-Ft2 singles chronology
"Everybody Go" (2011)	"We Never Give Up!" (2011)

Music video
- "Everybody Go" on YouTube

"Everybody Go" is the first single by Japanese boy band Kis-My-Ft2 released on August 10, 2011.

== Overview ==
The CD release was announced on June 24, 2011. The CD was originally scheduled to be released in May, but was postponed due to 2011 Tōhoku earthquake and tsunami. In addition, the lyrics and tune of the title song were changed and arranged to be a song that lights up and gives hope to Japan. The album was also released in Taiwan, Hong Kong, Thailand, the Philippines, Singapore, Malaysia, and South Korea.

It was released in four formats: first edition A, first edition B, regular edition, and Kis-My-Ft2 shop limited edition. In addition, there are "red jacket edition" and "white jacket edition" for the standard edition, and only the "white jacket edition" comes with a lyrics booklet (20 pages).

The title song "Everybody Go" is the theme song for the TBS TV Friday night drama He is Beautiful starred Yuta Tamamori and Taisuke Fujigaya.

On September 3, at the "13th Tokyo Girls Collection 2011 A/W" event held at Saitama Super Arena, Taisuke Fujigaya and Yuta Tamamori, who were the cast of the drama, appeared on the tie-in stage for the drama as appeared as secret guests and performed the theme song.

The song was performed during their first appearance on the 70th NHK Kōhaku Uta Gassen broadcast on December 31, 2019.

== Chart performance ==
The song debuted at No. 1 on the Oricon Weekly Singles Chart dated August 22. With 316,000 first-week sales, it became the third-highest first-week sales record for a debut single, following KAT-TUN's "Real Face" (754,000 copies) and Arashi's "Arashi (song)" (557,000 copies). It became the fourth highest all-time record. It also reached number one on the Billboard Japan Hot 100. It was the 10th best-selling single in Japan in 2011, with 441,680 copies.

== Track listing ==
=== CD ===
1. "Everybody Go" (4:42) (Ken Katoh, catcher of the Yomiuri Giants, used it as his appearance song (2012 - 2016))
  - Lylics: Joya Uenaka (The Inazuma Sentai)
  - Composer: Samuel Waermö, Stefan Åberg, Octobar
  - Arranger: Yasunari Nakamura
2. "S.O.KISS" (3:50)
  - Lylics: Zopp
  - Composer: Steven Lee
  - Arranger: Chokkaku
3. "Kiss For U" (3:43) (Regular edition only)
  - Lylics: Minori, Komu
  - Composer/Arranger: Steven Lee
4. "Young People" (4:29) (Regular edition only)
  - Lylics: Takeshi Aida
  - Composer: Junkoo, Takuya Harada, Anders Dannvik, Niclas Lundin
  - Arranger: Chokkaku

=== DVD ===
- First Edition A
1. "Everybody Go" Music Video
2. Music video making movie
- First Edition B
  - From "Kis-My-Ft ni Aeru de Show vol.3 at Yoyogi National Gymnasium 2011.2.12 (Live Video)"
1. "Fire beat"
2. "Kis-My-Calling!"
3. Bonus Movie
