= MENT Recording =

Japanese record label

MENT Recording inc.

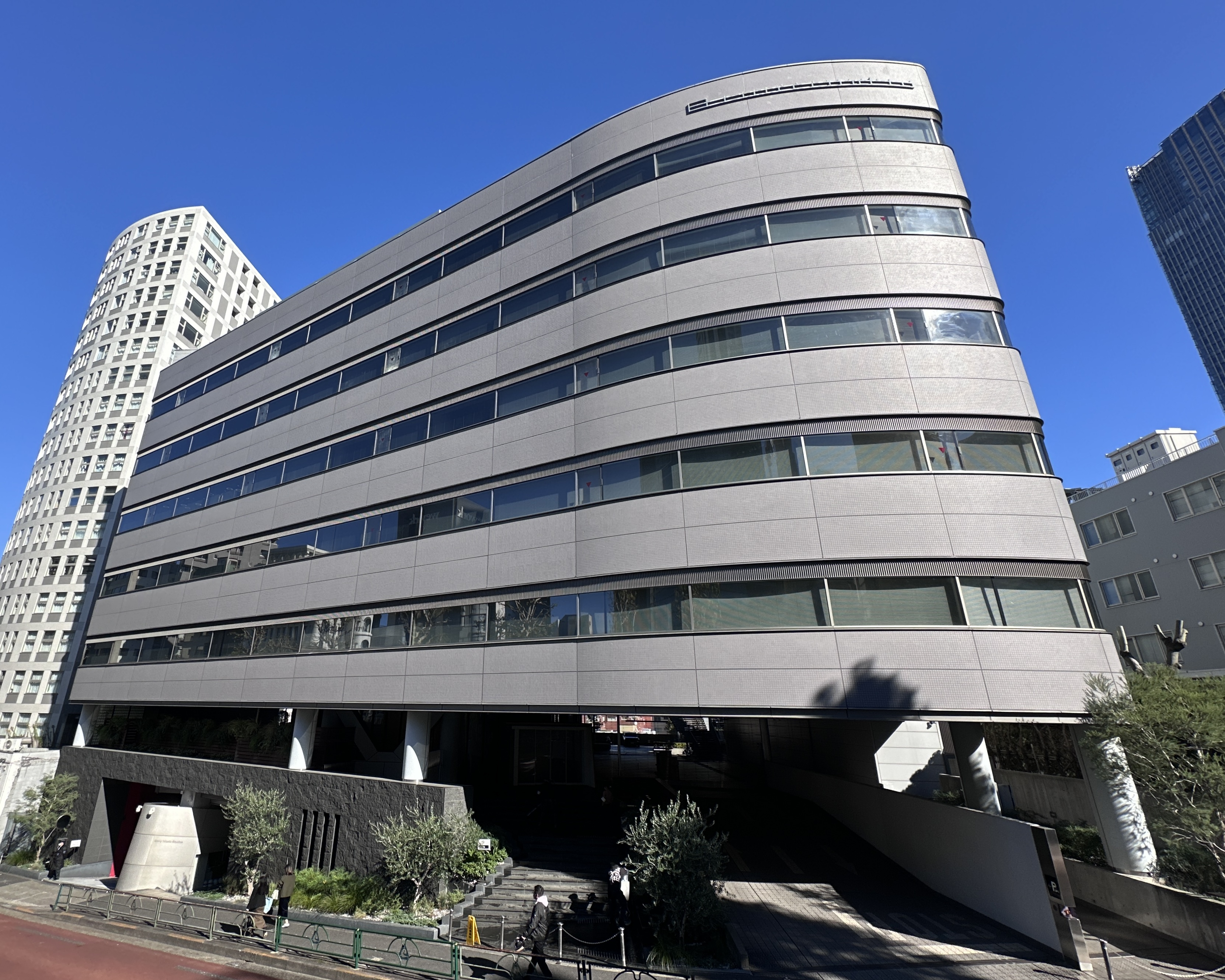
- Headquarters in Minato, Tokyo
- Company type: Private K.K.
- Industry: Music
- Founded: January 11, 2022
- Founder: Julie Keiko Fujishima
- Key people: Shintaro Higuchi, Maiko Shino
- Parent: Smile Up (formerly Johnny & Associates), Avex Trax
- Website: mentrecording.jp(Japanese)

MENT Recording
- Parent company: Avex Trax, Smile-Up
- Founded: 2022
- Founder: Julie Keiko Fujishima
- Distributor: Avex Trax
- Genre: J-pop
- Country of origin: Japan
- Location: Minato, Tokyo, Japan

MENT Recording Inc. is a Japanese recording company and record label of the same name, founded on 11 January 2022. It was jointly established by Johnny & Associates and Avex Inc.

== History ==
On January 11, 2022, record company Avex Trax and former talent agency Johnny & Associates announced the joint establishment of MENT Recording Inc. The company is a privately held company. The meaning of "MENT" is an acronym for the four words "Music," "Entertainment," "Network," and "Transmission." "MENT" itself has a variety of meanings at the beginning and end of words, which is why it was chosen as the company name.

The founding president was former president of Johnny & Associates Julie Keiko Fujishima. Shintaro Higuchi, a current president of the company, is an executive of an subsidiary of Avex Inc. He was a director of subsidiary Avex Entertainment Inc. until July 2023 and has been chairman of the board of Avex Music Creative Inc. since August 1, 2023.

Former V6 members (20th century and Ken Miyake), Kis-My-Ft2, and Snow Man, all of whom belonged to Avex Trax, are affiliated with this company. The company became a supporting member of the Recording Industry Association of Japan on March 1. The company address is Akasaka, Minato, Tokyo, the location of the former Johnny & Associates.

In the wake of the Johnny Kitagawa sexual abuse scandal, it was decided that Johnny & Associates would be closed down in October 2023, and accordingly, the artists belonging to the company was transferred to a new company, Starto Entertainment, and groups also belonged to Starto. However, the details of the affiliated company, Ment Recording, Inc. are unknown, as it was only reported that Julie Fujishima had stepped down as president.

Currently, the two main groups that belong to this company are Kis-My-Ft2 and Snow Man. Snow Man debuted in 2020 and has since broken out, selling nearly 1 million CDs each time as of 2024, making up the core of the label's sales.

== Background ==
Groups affiliated with former Johnny & Associates often belonged to private labels financed by Johnny's, such as Arashi, NEWS and KAT-TUN, but it is said that the groups affiliated with Avex Trax had difficulty establishing private labels because of the different factions within the company. V6 was said to be from the faction of late vice president Mary Fujishima and her daughter former president Julie Fujishima, Tackey & Tsubasa, which disbanded in 2018, was a neutral faction attached to Johnny Kitagawa, and Kis-My-Ft2 was from the Michi Iijima faction, which is opposed to Mary and Julie, and they were said to be enemies with each other. It is said that after Iijima left the company in 2016, SMAP, which she was in charge of, was disbanded and Kis-My-Ft2 was taken over by different people to manage, which eliminated the reason for the conflict and led to the establishment of the private label.

== Executives ==
- Presidents: Shintaro Higuchi, Maiko Shino, since May 30, 2024.
  - Former president: Julie Keiko Fujishima, until May 30, 2024.
- Directors: Shinsuke Hashimoto, Shintaro Higuchi, Maiko Shino
  - Former director: Hideaki Takizawa, until October 31, 2022.

According to the company's register obtained on February 12, 2025, the four directors initially named as directors, besides President Julie, were Shintaro Higuchi, Hideaki Takizawa, Maiko Shino, and Shinsuke Hashimoto. Of these, Hideaki Takizawa resigned from this director position on October 31, 2022, upon his departure from Johnny & Associates. Keiko Fujishima Julie, who was initially the representative director of the company, resigned from the same position on May 30, 2024. Shintaro Higuchi and Maiko Shino, two of the company's directors, became representative directors on the same day, May 30, 2024.

== Artists ==
- Current, As of 2025:
  - 20th Century: 20th Century is a group derived from V6 (band).
  - Kis-My-Ft2
    - Busaiku
  - Snow Man
- Former:
  - Ken Miyake (Since 2022 to May 2023)

== See also ==
- Johnny & Associates
- Starto Entertainment
- Avex Inc.
- Avex Music Creative
  - Avex Trax – Avex Group's main label. Artists belonging to this label belonged to this label before its establishment.
- J-Friends – a special project launched in 1997 by artists affiliated with Johnny & Associates. The project ended in 2003.
