= Katsuhide Uekusa =

Japanese actor and singer (born 1966)

- 植草 克秀
- Born: July 24, 1966 (age 60); Chiba, Japan
- Occupations: Actor; singer
- Agent(s): 2Steps (2021–present); Johnny & Associates (1977–2020)
- Musical career
- Also known as: Kacchan
- Genre: J-pop
- Occupation: Singer
- Years active: 1980–present
- Label: rockfield
- Formerly of: Shonentai

Katsuhide Uekusa (Japanese: 植草 克秀, born July 24, 1966) is a Japanese actor and singer. Until 2020, He belonged to the Johnny & Associates and was a member of the boy band Shonentai. Born in Chiba Prefecture, Japan. His best-known television series include Wataru Seken wa Oni Bakari, a popular domestic drama that ran for more than 20 years.

== History ==
=== Childhood ===
Uekusa was born in Chiba City, Chiba Prefecture in 1966. His father owned a lumber business and his father often took care of the people around him, so he grew up in a lively environment with many people coming and going. Uekusa later said that because he grew up in this environment, he liked to take care of his junior even after he joined Johnny's. As a child, he played actively and got injured all the time, so his parents often scolded him to calm down. He once dreamed of becoming an aircraft pilot as his future dream, but gave it up after his mother told him that a pilot must have strong teeth and be intelligent. When he was in elementary school, Uekusa's father was worried about his restlessness and sent him on a round-the-world trip with other children his age. On that trip, he was surprised to learn that the children he accompanied knew a lot of Western music, including the Beatles. When he was in junior high school, a classmate invited him to take an audition for Johnny's with him, but he declined and did not take it. However, when Johnny Kitagawa saw Uekusa in a photo sent by a classmate, he called the classmate and said, "Who is this boy in the photo with you?". Uekusa was invited to the TV Asahi studio in Roppongi to observe the lesson. There, young trainees were practicing dance, but he was shocked and did not attend the lessons for a while because at that time it was not considered cool for men to sing and dance. Despite these conflicts, Uekusa ended up joining Johnny & Associates in February 1980.

=== 1980– Early career ===
When Uekusa first met Noriyuki Higashiyama, he thought he was a cool boy, fair-skinned and slender. Kazukiyo Nishikiori was said as a genius, and when Uekusa first met, Nishikiori suddenly did a backflip in front of many people. Under Nishikiori's influence, all the trainees in Johnny's at that time practiced backflips with injuries. Then Uekusa began to live in a Johnny's dormitory in Harajuku with Higashiyama and Nishikiori, who would later form the Shonentai. In the dormitory he practiced dance and acrobatics with the other trainees. Uekusa said that he thought he could not do backflips because he was not good at gymnastics, but even if he could not do it, he was put into his own choreography, so he had no choice but to do it, and before he knew it, he was able to do backflips. Every day after returning home from high school, Higashiyama would watch Michael Jackson music videos to study dance moves, and work on muscle training by lifting barbells. In the evenings, Nishikiori would bring music tapes he had composed himself, and they would talk to each other about what types melodies they wanted to play. Uekusa loved taking care of and playing with the juniors. Sometimes he would go to the dressing rooms of his juniors and stay there until the very last minute of the performance, which sometimes delayed the start of the performance, and he was finally banned from the backstage area by their office. Tomoya Nagase, one of the juniors, said that Uekusa was a man who had love for his juniors and Masahiro Matsuoka said that Uekusa was a very scary senior, but he was one of the few seniors we could prank.

=== 1985–2020 Acting career ===
Uekusa, along with Noriyuki Higashiyama and Kazukiyo Nishikiori, formed the boy band Shonentai in 1982 and made their record debut in 1985 with Kamen Butōkai. Aside from his boy band activities as Shonentai, on an individual basis Uekusa has worked mainly as an actor. Uekusa made his first appearance in a television series in 1990 in Ikenai Joshi Gakko Monogatari , starring Yuko Kotegawa. That same year he began appearing in the third season of the popular detective television series Sasurai Keiji Ryojō-hen (Wandering Detective Traveler's Section). He was influenced by actor Yoichi Miura, with whom he co-starred senior actor in this television series. Miura advised Uekusa about acting. At the time, Uekusa was still a novice actor, didn't know what was interesting about working as an actor, and was given only a good-looking actor's role. Miura advised him "You don't have to do anything serious. You can do whatever you like." Later, he began to act not only by reading scripts but also by weaving his own sensibilities into his performances. As a result, he began to receive offers not only for handsome roles, but also for roles with funny or unique personalities that had never come his way before. In 1993, he began appearing in the second season of the popular domestic drama television series Wataru Seken wa Oni Bakari, since then, where he appeared regularly for over twenty years. This work became his best known work, and he has said that even after the television series ended, he is sometimes approached by people in town under the name of his role in this drama, Eisaku. He was also influenced by the stage play Atami Murder Case directed by Kohei Tsuka, which he saw at Miura's recommendation, and became interested in theater play. He later appeared in 2008 and 2009 in Shock, a musical theatre starring Koichi Domoto, a his junior actor of Johnny's, and continued to see the play since then.

=== 2021– Independence ===
On September 20, 2020, Uekusa announced that he and Nishikiori would be leaving the Johnny's by the end of the year. Higashiyama would remain with Johnny's, but "out of respect for the achievements of the group and the wishes of the members, it was decided to keep the name Shonentai alive," according to the unusual announcement. Uekusa said that they did not specifically discuss the decision to quit with Nishikiori, and that the main reason he left was that he no longer had anyone to advise him on anything to do with his work after the death of Johnny Kitagawa, whom Uekusa considers to be his father in show business, who died in 2019.

In January 2021, Katsuhide Uekusa's official website, official Twitter account, and official Instagram account were launched. He also revealed that he had established his personal office, 2step, and said that he would like to work hard from now on as if it were the second chapter of his life. He also started his personal music career, October in 2023, the mini-album Polaris was released from rock field. In September 2021, he and Uekusa launched the YouTube channel "Nicky and Kacchanel", and the following year, they held a dinner theater. In 2023, Uekusa performed his own solo concert, Katsuhide Uekusa 2023 Moving On -Second Season-, which also featured his juniors, former Hikaru Genji members Hiroyuki Sato and Junichi Yamamoto, giving a breathtaking performance by senior and junior members.

When asked about reviving the Shonentai during an appearance on the variety show Poka Poka in October 2024, Uekusa replied, "I am thinking about it. Because I miss doing concerts and dinner shows by myself," and even so, "There will be about one person who is going through a tough time right now (Higashiyama). I just have to support him now," he said. He then clarified, "Shonentai was never disbanded in the first place."

== Role in Shonentai ==
Uekusa played the funny guy, the goofy character in Shonentai. Higashiyama, on the other hand, played the role of a serious and taciturn prince. Nishikiori initially played a serious role because he was the senior of the two, but gradually began to play a unique character who cracked jokes. Uekusa and Higashiyama are same age and seemed to have an easy-going relationship where they could fight about anything. One day, Uekusa got angry and fought with Higashiyama when he found out that Higashiyama had bought and worn a Disney watch that Uekusa had been wanting for a long time. According to his junior colleague Masahiro Matsuoka of Tokio, when Higashiyama forgot his lines on one play, Uekusa quickly and tactfully ad-libbed to follow up. Higashiyama continued the play, pretending that Uekusa had forgotten his lines instead of himself, and the audience broke out in laughter and the scene was settled, and the junior members who were watching the exchange were impressed. According to Uekusa, when the three Shonentai members were together, he was the main focus of their fights. It usually started with Higashiyama pointing out to Uekusa the details of what was wrong with the dance choreography. Higashiyama, a precise man, didn't overlook even the smallest dance mistake. When he pointed out "that part is not correct," Uekusa would say back "it is correct," and a fight would break out. Nishikiori would often intercede between them. Higashiyama later confided, "When I made a mistake in a dance, I once glared at Uekusa and made it look as if he made the mistake. Uekusa got upset when I glareed at him, and he thought he made a mistake." Nishikiori was older than Uekusa and Higashiyama and had excellent dancing skills, so they rarely argued with him. As Uekusa himself has jokingly said, he was not the best dancer in the Shonentai, but he was confident that his acting and singing were as good as those of the other two.

== Personal life ==
Uekusa married actress and model Chieko Higuchi who was a junior when he was in high school in July 1994 and had a son and a daughter, but they divorced in December 2010. Their son is actor Yuta Higuchi. He later remarried in October 2013, and it was reported that a girl was born shortly thereafter. Uekusa's son Yuta entered Johnny's when he was 12 years old as a lesson student under the name Yuta Uekusa in 2007, he appeared as the role of Uekusa's son in 2007 Playzone '07 Change 2 Chance. This was the first time a father and son performed together since the founding of the Johnny's, and it became a big topic of conversation. Yuta later left Johnny's in 2010, changed his family name to Higuchi in 2012, and has continued his entertainment career with a different agency.

== Filmography ==
=== TV series (selected) ===
- Heart-pounding After School (1983)-Katsuhisa
  - Heart-pounding After School 2 (1983)
- Bad Girls' High School Story (1990) – Takashi Nishino
- Wandering Detective Journey Series (1990–1995) – Ryota Sakurada
  - Wandering Detective Journey III (1990–1991)
  - Wandering Detective Journey IV (1991–1992)
  - Wandering Detective Journey V (1992–1993)
  - Wandering Detective Journey VI (1993–1994)
  - Wandering Detective Journey VII (1994–1995)
- Wataru Seken wa Oni Bakari Series (1993–2012) – Eisaku Homma
  - Wataru Seken wa Oni Bakari, Season 2 (1993–1994)
  - Wataru Seken wa Oni Bakari 3 (1996–1997)
  - Wataru Seken wa Oni Bakari Season 4 (1998–1999)
  - Wataru Seken wa Oni Bakari Season 5 (2000–2001)
  - Wataru Seken wa Oni Bakari Season 6 (2002–2003)
  - Wataru Seken wa Oni Bakari Season 7 (2004–2005)
  - Wataru Seken wa Oni Bakari Season 8 (2006–2007)
  - Wataru Seken wa Oni Bakari Season 9 (2008–2009)
  - Wataru Seken wa Oni Bakari Season 10 (2010–2011)
  - Wataru Seken wa Oni Bakari Tadaima 2-Hour Special (2012)
  - Wataru Seken wa Oni Bakari 2-week consecutive special (2013)
  - Wataru Seken wa Oni Bakari: The First-Ever 3-Hour Special (2017)
  - Wataru Seken wa Oni Bakari: The Second 3-Hour Special (2018)
  - Wataru Seken wa Oni Bakari: The Third 3-Hour Special (2019)
- Professor Munakata Series (2000–2007) – Ryoichi Tamura
  - Professor Munakata's Strange Tales (2000)
  - Professor Munakata's Strange Tales 2 (2003)
  - Professor Munakata's Strange Tales 3 (2007)
- Atami Murder Case (2001) – Kumada Tomekichi
- Detective Yasuura is back! And... Goodbye Detective Tazaki! (2005)
  - Detective Yasuura is back! Farewell to Detective Natsume!! (2006)
- Yasuo Uchida Travel Suspense – Inspector Okabe Series (2006–2009) – Ueda (Detective)
- Kurashiki Murder Case (2006)
- Tama Lakeside Murder Case (2007)
- Thirteen Gravestones (2008)
- Coelacanth Murder Case (2009)
- Port Town Humanity Nurse (2006–2008) – Junpei Touma
- Shinano Sleeping Song Murder Case (2006)
- Izu Onsen Resort Murder Case (2007)
- Fuji Five Lakes ~ Steam Jizo Murder Incident (2008)
- Prosecutor Yuko Kasumi "A Corpse Walking in the Forest" (2011) – Akira Nagasawa
- Midnight Bakery Episode 7 (2013) – Motofumi Mimasaka
- Detective's Cross (2014) – Kenichi Nomura
- Monday Golden Mother's Medical Diary "I won't forget! A promise from 20 years ago Kobe *Awajishima Edition" (2015) – Kyosuke Ohashi
- Shokatsu no Onna 10 (2015)-Shinichi Takayanagi
- Mito Komon Special (2015) – Tokugawa Tsunayoshi
- Unsolved Woman: Tokyo Metropolitan Police Department Document Investigator Episode 5 (2018) – Shoichi Matsukawa

=== Films ===
Year	Title	Role	Notes	Ref.
1982	Heart-pounding After School	Student	Starring Ippei Hikaru	
1983	The Man Who Calls the Storm	Eiji Kokubun	Starring Masahiko Kondo	
1983	Love Forever		Starring Toshihiko Tahara	
1983	That guy and Lullaby	Shonentai	Leading role	
1987	19 Nineteen	Shonentai	Leading role	
1988	Venus Wars	Hiro (voice actor)		

== Theatre Play ==
Year	Title	Role	Theatre	Notes
1985	Musical Adventure "The Sasuke"	Saburo Tao	Umeda Koma Theater	
1989	Fujijuro and Okaji	Sakata Oribe	Nissay Theatre	
1995	Comrades	Seitaro	Geijutsuza	
1999/2002/2006	Wataru Seken wa Oni Bakari	Eisaku Honma	Geijutsuza/2006:Meijiza	
2000	Once Upon a Mattress	Prince Dauntless	Aoyama Theater	
2003	Machiko Kanzashi	Detective Sakurai	Geijutsuza	
2006	Chushingura of Women	Oishi Sezaemon	Meijiza/Meitetsu Hall	
2009/2010/2011/2012/2015	Endless Shock	The owner Uekusa	Imperial Theater	
2009	She Loves Me	Stephen Kodaly	Theater Crea	
2010	33 Variations	Mike Clark	Le Theatre Ginza by PARCO/Theater Drama City	
2011	Reading drama "Love Letters"		PARCO Theater	
2013	Dream Jumbo Treasure Please Never Punish Me	Starring Itō Hirobumi	Aoyama Theater / Umeda Arts Theater	
2013	40 Carats		Osaka Shochikuza/Tokyo Metropolitan Theatre Playhouse	

== Discography ==
=== Single ===
No.	Release date	Title	highest-ranking	First release album	Note
1	December 21, 2021	Show & Time	–	Polaris	Dinner show and fan club limited release

=== Mini album ===
No.	Release date	Title	highest-ranking	Ref.
1	October 10, 2023	Polaris	24th	

== Concert ==
- Katsuhide Uekusa's first solo Christmas dinner show (1997, Tokyo / Osaka)
- Katsuhide Uekusa Christmas Dinner Show (1998, Tokyo / Osaka)
- Johnnys' Countdown 2014–2015 (December 31, 2014 – January 1, 2015, Tokyo Dome)
- Kazukiyo Nishikiori & Katsuhide Uekusa presents their Show & Time "Song for You" (2022, Tokyo/ Osaka)
- Katsuhide Uekusa 2023 Moving On Second Season (2023, Tokyo / Nagoya / Osaka)
