= Playzone =

Japanese musical production from 1986 to 2015

- DVD cover 2006
- Premiere: July 5, 1986; 40 years ago: Aoyama Theatre
- Productions: 1986 Tokyo; 1987 Tokyo; 1988 Tokyo; 1989 Tokyo; 1990 Tokyo; 1991 Tokyo; 1992 Tokyo; 1993 Tokyo; 1994 Tokyo; 1995 Tokyo; 1996 Tokyo; 1997 Tokyo; 1998 Tokyo; 1999 Tokyo; 2000 Tokyo; 2001 Tokyo; 2002 Tokyo; 2003 Tokyo; 2004 Tokyo; 2005 Tokyo; 2006 Tokyo; 2007 Tokyo; 2008 Tokyo; 2009 Tokyo; 2010 Tokyo; 2011 Tokyo; 2012 Tokyo; 2013 Tokyo; 2014 Tokyo (Note: It staged at the Nissay Theatre in January and at the Aoyama Theatre in July.); 2015 Tokyo

Playzone is a Japanese musical production. It used to be presented annually from 1986 to 2015 under the auspices of Johnny & Associates. The lead role was played by Shonentai until the 2008 performance, after which it was played by junior members of the Johnny's in turn. It is supervised by Johnny Kitagawa and produced by Tsuyoshi Yamato.

== Overview ==
An original musical that premiered at the Aoyama Theatre in the summer of 1986, the year after Shonentai's debut, (Note: Except for West Side Story, which was staged in 2004.) and was performed every summer. 2005 summer marked its 20th year, and 2007 (its 22nd year) marked its 900th performance. Playzone starring Shonentai ended on August 31, 2008. The total number of performances by Shonentai was 957, with an audience of 1,380,465. Since 2009, Playzone has been performed by junior members of Johnny's, but in 2015, with the closing of the Aoyama Theatre, the show also ended. The total number of performances was 1,232, and the number of audiences reached 1,737,450. The performers are mainly celebrities and trainees from the Johnny & Associates, but also include outside dance teams and people from theatrical troupes. All the stories are original stories, except for West Side Story, which was staged in 2004. After 2011, the main structure of the show was singing and dancing to famous Johnny's songs and new songs, and the theatrical part of the show disappeared. Due to copyright issues, no video productions are available for 2004. The 2007 performance was not made into a video because Akira Akasaka, the performer, was arrested for drug possession after the performance and fired from Johnny's, but it was made into a video for the first time in the Shonentai 35th Anniversary Best Playzone Box 1986-2008 in 2020.

== Production history ==
From 1986, when the show was first performed, until the 2008 performance, the Shonentai members starred in the lead roles. From 2009 to the final performance in 2015, the show was starred by junior members of the Johnny's.

=== 1986 Playzone '86 Mystery ===
The title of the performance was Playzone '86 Mystery. It ran from July 5–27, 1986 for 30 performances. The choreography was partly by Michael Peters. Higashiyama later said that the three members of Shonentai took eight hours of lessons from Peters every day leading up to the premiere. Uekusa later said that the Aoyama Theatre has a very deep Trap Room, and that at the time he was afraid of falling into it, and it even came to him in his dreams. Michael Peters choreographed the songs "Mystery Zone" and "Diamond Eyes" performed in the play. In addition, 50 members of the Kayoko Nakura Jazz Dance Studio performed in the film, and Nakura herself choreographed songs such as "Say Hello New York".

==== Story ====
Three young men, Kazu, Nori and Hide, who yearn to see a Broadway musical, each work part-time to save money for the trip and finally go to New York. However, as soon as they arrive, they are robbed and everything is stolen. They take up residence at the mansion of a gentleman, Magical Mystery Dad, who passes by and offers to help them, and while taking dance lessons, they take on the dubious jobs they are asked to do. When the three of them become friends with his daughter, Fairy Mary, they accept her request and go to her runaway sister, High School Lullaby, to convince her to come home.

==== Cast/Staff ====
Cast	Kazukiyo Nishikiori as Kazu; Katsuhide Uekusa as Hide; Noriyuki Higashiyama as Nori; Ryoji Hattori as Magical Mystery Dad; Naomi Ueno as Mama Versailles; Atsumi Hiraguri as High School Lullaby; Mayumi Ohnuma as Fairy Mary
Staff	Writer/director by Toshihiro Nagatsuka; Choreography by Michael Peters, Kayoko Nakura; Creation/Composition by Hiroyuki Moriizumi; Music by Takashi Inoue

=== 1987 Playzone '87 Time-19 ===
Performed under the title Playzone '87 Time-19. The show ran from July 3–26, 1987 for 30 performances. A musical version of the movie "19 Nineteen" starring Shonentai. During the performance period, Uekusa was involved in a traffic accident and was unable to perform for three days, but Nishikiori and Higashiyama learned the lines instead and followed up.

==== Story ====
Near future. Three young men, Tsuyoshi, Kazuki and Jinichi, are bored in a country called "Outland". All kinds of fun are forbidden here. The world is governed by a group of women called the Metropolis Police. Sentenced to death for violating the rule that they must spend no time on anything other than work and rest, they propose to save this food-starved world by going to the past in a time machine with the three of them, bringing back dinosaurs and breeding them as food. This is listened to and they set off on a journey through time.

==== Cast/Staff ====
Cast	Kazukiyo Nishikiori as Kazuki; Katsuhide Uekusa as Jinichi; Noriyuki Higashiyama as Tsuyoshi; Tomoki Okazaki as Women's Police Captain/Queen of the Night (Two roles); Yuki Matsushita as Women's Police Deputy commander/Salome (Two roles); Natsuki Ozawa, Chieko Mai as Alice (W cast); Bonchi Osamu as chief of the elderly
Staff	Composition, direction and choreography by Taku Yamada; Composition and screenplay by Sunao Kato

=== 1988 Playzone '88 Caprico - Angel and Devil Rhapsody - ===
Performed under the title Playzone '88 Caprico - Angel and Devil Rhapsody -. It was performed at the Aoyama Theatre from July 4 to July 31, 1988, and at the Osaka Festival Hall from August 23 to August 31, 1988. A total of 51 performances. The total number of performances reached 100.

==== Story ====
One day, Shohei Konan, assistant to private detective Akechi Koroku, wakes up from a strange dream and finds himself lying in the middle of Ginza. On the way to work, a fortune teller prophesises that "a devil will soon take up residence in your body" and sells him a medicine that will help him get help from an "angel". Shohei gulps it down in one gulp. The fortuneteller also predicts that he will fall in love with a beautiful girl, and disappears. Then the devil, who is Shohei's "shadow", and the angel, who is his "conscience", appear. The angel and the demon are only visible to Shohei. The butler of the Zaizen Pearl Co. visits the detective agency and comes to discuss the fact that the Zaizen family has received advance letter from the thief Mikesh to steal the Blue Star, a diamond with a market value of 700 million yen. Shohei meets and falls in love with Julian, the Zaizen family's daughter.

==== Cast/Staff ====
Cast	Katsuhide Uekusa as Shohei Konan; Kazukiyo Nishikiori as Devil; Noriyuki Higashiyama as Angel; Yosuke Kondo as Koroku Akechi; Bengal as Kinshiro Zaizen; Kenzo Kaneko as Inspector Tame; Masataka Nakamura as fortuneteller; Toru Hanabusa as butler; Yoko Kodama as Julian
Staff	Written and Directed by Sunao Kato; Only "The Show" is written, composed and directed by Johnny Kitagawa; Choreography by Kayoko Nakura

=== 1989 Playzone '89 Again ===
Performed under the title Playzone '89 Again. It was performed at the Aoyama Theatre from July 6 to July 30, 1989, at the Aichi Kōsei Nenkin Kaikan from August 3 to August 7, 1989, and at the Festival Hall from August 13 to August 19, 1989. 53 performances in total.

==== Story ====
Ken loses consciousness during a gig at a live music venue and finds himself in an unknown place. From the angels around him, Ken learns that he died by mistake. However, because it was a mistake, god ordered him to adapt the "Again System" and Ken was allowed to return to the lower world in the body of a girl. The rules of this system are that if Ken helps the humans he meets find meaning in life by removing their problems, he will be granted eternal life, failing which he will be sent back to heaven. As a girl, Ken visits Mummy's Cafe, a restaurant in a corner of downtown. The owner, Mummy, looks after many orphans. Ken talks to Joe, the leader of the group, and Ryu appears, who says he is in love with the girl Ken is borrowing a body from. Ryu is the son of Mr Fox, a powerful man in the town, who are at odds with Joe and his friends. Meanwhile, Ken succeeds to regain his own body through the "Again System". When Ken, concerned about Joe and Ryu, visits Mummy's Café again, the shop is about to be dispossessed by Mr Fox, who wants to redevelop the entire surrounding area.

==== Cast/Staff ====
Cast	Katsuhide Uekusa as Ken; Noriyuki Higashiyama as Joe; Kazukiyo Nishikiori as Ryu; Shigeyuki Nakamura as Hiro; Eiji Furukawa (W cast) as Hide; Yoshiko Tsunoda as Mammy; Joji Masukawa, Atom Kobayashi as Angel
Staff	Screenplay by Mie Hirano; Direction/Screenplay by Toru Hanabusa; Choreography by Kayoko Nakura and Bobby Yoshino

=== 1990 Playzone '90 Mask ===
Performed under the title Playzone '90 Mask. It was performed at the Aoyama Theatre from July 7–29, 1990 and at the Festival Hall from August 11–19, 1990. A total of 42 performances. The play Hamlet was directed by Yukio Ninagawa. The total number of performances reached 200.

==== Story ====
While talking backstage after the final performance of Shonentai's musical, member Nishiki tells them that he is going to New York by himself for a while. Higashi and Uekusa are surprised and angry at the sudden news. Their manager, Mie, has noticed that Nishiki is hiding something. In fact, only Nisiki knows that Uekusa is suffering from a serious illness that even Uekusa herself does not know about, and in order to give Uekusa a break, Nisiki has been playing the role of a traitor. Unsatisfied with Nshiki's self-serving behaviour, Higashi and Uekusa drank and got drunk. In a strange dream Uekusa had, Nishiki appears. After Nishiki leaves for New York, Higashi performs in a play by Yukio Ninagawa. When he is surprised to see the face of one of his back-up dancers as Nishiki, the real, jolly Uekusa appears and together they perform a scene from Hamlet.

==== Cast/Staff ====
Cast	Kazukiyo Nishikiori as Nishiki; Katsuhide Uekusa as Uekusa; Noriyuki Higashiyama as Higashi; Mie Nakao as Mie in charge of manager
Staff	Written, composed, directed by Johnny Kitagawa; Directed by Yukio Ninagawa (Hamlet); Choreography: Kayoko Nakura, Tony Tee, Bryant Baldwin, Bobby Yoshino.

=== 1991 Playzone '91 Shock ===
Performed under the title Playzone '91 Shock. Performed at the Aoyama Theatre from 4–28 July 1991 and at the Festival Hall from 10 to 14 August 1991. 41 performances in total. The musical Shock, starring Koichi Domoto, premiered in 2000 and continued every year until 2024, but the prototype for Shock was Playzone in 1991, and Domoto later said that he and Shock would not be where they are today without Shonentai.

==== Story ====
In 1981, three men, Nishiki, Higashi and Uekusa, are back-up dancers for a star called "The General". Their manager Yamamura delivers them a schedule for a national tour as "Shonentai", and the three begin their activities. Summer 1983. Shonentai and backing band "Shigeyuki Nakamura and Tokio" continue touring. Nishiki, fed up with the travelling days, declares that tomorrow they will travel by motorbike and invites Uekusa to join them. They set off in bad weather and the motorbike falls off a suspension bridge on a mountain road. Nishiki's injuries were minor, but Ueksa was seriously injured. However, Higashi insisted that the show must go on no matter what, and Shige, who was a member of the backing band, took Uekusa's place on stage. In 1985, Shonentai's popularity rises with Shige in the band. Meanwhile, Uekusa was recuperating in a place with a view of the sea. Higashi visits him, but Uekusa continues to spend his days staring at the sea and looking for whales. He compares his inability to walk to that of a legless whale. The play The Moby-Dick. Nishiki, now Captain Ahab, takes on the white whale in an attempt to avenge his left leg, which was bitten off in a battle with a giant whale.

==== Cast/Staff ====
Cast	Kazukiyo Nishikori as Nishikiori; Katsuhide Uekusa as Uekusa; Noriyuki Higashiyama as Higashiyama; Shigeru Joshima as member of Tokio; Tatsuya Yamaguchi as member of Tokio; Taichi Kokubun as member of Tokio; Hiromu Kojima as (former) member of Tokio; Masahiro Matsuoka as member of Tokio; Shigeyuki Nakamura as Shige; Michiko Yamamura as Manager Yamamura
Staff	Written, composed and directed by Johnny Kitagawa; Composer by Henry Krager; Choreography by Kayoko Nakura, Bobby Yoshino and Jeffrey Amsden

=== 1992 Playzone '92 Farewell Diary ===
Performed under the title Playzone '92 Farewell Diary. Performed at the Aoyama Theatre from 11 Jul - 2 Aug 1992 and at the Festival Hall from 12 Aug - 16 Aug 1992. 39 performances in total.

==== Story ====
In the near future, the capital is in ruins due to indiscriminate attacks by unmanned security aircraft that have gone out of control. Two soldiers (Higashiyama, Uekusa) use a bio-reactor to discover an old man (Nishikiori) wandering alone. The old man says that he can see a theatre called ‘Apocalypse’ in the ruins and that his friends are in it, and leaves. A diary is left behind, which is picked up by one of the soldiers (Uekusa). The diary describes the days of the old man's youth. His name is Ken, and as a young man he was one of the core members of a dance troupe called Apocalypse. Shaw (Higashiyama), Jun (Uekusa) and Ken (Nishikori) and other friends celebrate the theatre company's fifth anniversary foundation day. Shaw gives a commemorative speech and tells them that, as usual, the troupe will disband after tomorrow's performance and reassemble the following year. While everyone is excited, Ken tells them that he will not be able to come tomorrow. He says that he will be working for two years in his father's company to save money for their dream of building their own theatre.

==== Cast/Staff ====
Cast	Kazukiyo Nishikori as Ken/an old man; Katsuhide Uekusa as Jun; Noriyuki Higashiyama as Show; Shigeru Johjima; Tatsuya Yamaguchi; Taichi Kokubun; Hiromu Kojima; Masahiro Matsuoka; Tomoya Nagase
Staff	Screenplay and direction by Haruhiko Miyajima; Choreography by Kiyomi Maeda

=== 1993 Playzone '93 Window ===
Performed under the title Playzone '93 Window. It was performed at the Aoyama Theatre from July 8 to August 1, 1993, and at the Festival Hall from August 13 to August 19, 1993. A total of 41 performances. The total number of performances reached 300.

==== Story ====
Yuzuru (Nishikori) runs a small cleaning company, Work on Works, which he inherited from his father. Tatsuya (Higashiyama), who started working for the company two weeks ago, saves money by leading a double life: during the day he works as an office worker for another company, and at night he works here. One night, while Yuzuru and Tatsuya are cleaning the building late at night, a thug chased by the gangster runs into the building. Yuzuru and Tatsuya kick the gangster out, but are asked by the thug, Ryota (Uekusa), to hide him for a while.

==== Cast/Staff ====
Cast	Kazukiyo Nishikiori as Yuzuru; Katsuhide Uekusa as Ryota; Noriyuki Higashiyama as Tatsuya; Shigeru Joshima from Tokio as Misawa; Taichi Kokubun from Tokio as Akiyama; Tatsuya Yamaguchi from Tokio as Young employees of the company; Hiromu Kojima; Masahiro Matsuoka from Tokio as Young employees of the company; Tomoya Nagase from Tokio as Young employees of the company
Staff	Writer by Hiromi Mori; Directed by Noriyasu Yuzawa; Screenplay by Kiyotaka Sekine; Choreography by Kayoko Nakura, Kuniaki Suyama, Yuko Matsuoka, Sanche

=== 1994 Playzone '94 Moon ===
Performed under the title Playzone '94 Moon. It was performed at the Aoyama Theatre from July 5 to July 31, 1994, and at the Festival Hall from August 4 to August 12, 1994. Total of 45 performances. The total number of audiences exceeded 500,000. Uekusa announced her marriage on July.

==== Story ====
At night, in an urban park. Young people who have different jobs during the day are practising for a musical called Moon under the moonlight. Ibuki (Higashiyama) and Tomonatsuko (Moriyama) perform a duet. However, Tomoatsuko is not happy with Ibuki's singing and stops the song mid-song and starts arguing with him. Ibuki has a dream and tries to audition for an overseas musical, but Tomonatsuko does not want to leave him and prevents him from trying, which leads to a falling out between the two. They are surrounded by members of the theatre troupe. Nao (Omura), a student secretly in love with Ibuki; Riku (Uekusa), who has a crush on Nao; and Takashi (Nishikori), who has a crush on Tomonatsuko. They discuss their conflicting feelings by comparing them to the waxing and waning of the moon.

==== Cast/Staff ====
Cast	Kazukiyo Nishikiori as Takashi; Katsuhide Uekusa as Riku; Noriyuki Higashiyama as Ibuki; Mayumi Omura as Nao; Ryoko Moriyama as Yuriko
Staff	Writer - Mitsuru Izawa; Directed by - Shinichi Kamoshita; Choreography: Kiyomi Maeda, Yuko Matsuoka

=== 1995 Playzone '95 King & Joker: Dreams and Passion in the Film Industry ===
Performed under the title Playzone '95 King & Joker: Dreams and Passion in the Film Industry. It was performed at the Aoyama Theatre from July 7 to July 30, 1995, and at the Festival Hall, Osaka from August 9 to August 13, 1995. Total of 40 performances. Written and directed by Nishikiori. The show reached a total of 400 performances.

==== Story ====
The last scene of the film was shot on the roof of a building. After delivering his last line, the actor suddenly jumped off the building. The sudden tragedy of the movie star had the staff in an uproar and the scriptwriter disappointed. Two years later, the screenwriter Yuki (Uekusa) and actor Saotome (Higashiyama) reminisce about the past, talking about the actor who took his own life, Champ of Cinema (Nishikori).

==== Cast/Staff ====
Cast	Kazukiyo Nishikiori as a movie star; Katsuhide Uekusa as Yuki (scriptwriter); Noriyuki Higashiyama as Saotome (an actor)
Staff	Original Story by Shonentai; Written and Directed by Kazukiyo Nishikiori; Choreography by Kiyomi Maeda, Mariko Fujii, Yuzo Abe

=== 1996 Playzone '96 Rhythm ===
Performed under the title of Playzone '96 Rhythm. It was performed at the Aoyama Theatre from July 21 to August 11, 1996, and at the Festival Hall from August 13 to August 15, 1996. A total of 38 performances.

==== Story ====
People gather at the CD shop Rhythm in search of music and three shop assistants (Shonentai). When the Eve, Musical fairies, start the gramophone, a musical journey begins, as the three shop assistants change from their uniforms to stage costumes and sing and dance glamorously.

==== Cast/Staff ====
Cast	Kazukiyo Nishikiori; Katsuhide Uekusa; Noriyuki Higashiyama; Leona Niisato as Eve the Musical fairies; Clara Niisato as Eve the Musical fairies; Lilika Niisato as Eve the Musical fairies
Staff	Screenplay by Akiko Takasu; Directed by Kazuya Yamada; Choreography by Kiyomi Maeda, Sanche

=== 1997 Playzone '97 Rhythm II ===
The play was performed under the title of Playzone '97 Rhythm II. It was performed at the Aoyama Theatre from July 12 to August 3, 1997, and at the Festival Hall from August 8 to August 11, 1997. A total of 35 performances.

==== Story ====
Shonentai, V6 and others gather at the funeral of a senior singer. Uekusa puts a game called "Magic Box 7" on the PC left by the deceased. Nishikori and Higashiyama started playing the game and disappeared into the screen. Uekusa follows them and travels to the world in the game.

==== Cast/Staff ====
Cast	Kazukiyo Nishikiori as Nishikiori; Katsuhide Uekusa as Uekusa; Noriyuki Higashiyama as Higashi; Masayuki Sakamoto from 20th Century (V6); Hiroshi Nagano from 20th Century (V6); Yoshihiko Inohara from 20th Century (V6); Go Morita from V6; Ken Miyake from V6; Morita and Miyake went to observe the daytime performance and were invited to the nighttime performance as substitutes for the parts where Sakamoto and Inohara were unable to dance due to injury, and also appeared in subsequent regional performances.
Staff	Screenplay Akiko Takasu; Directed by Tamaki Endo; Choreography: Kiyomi Maeda, Sanche, Hideboh

=== 1998 Playzone '98 5night's ===
Performed under the title Playzone '98 5night's. Performances were held at the Aoyama Theatre from July 12 to August 9, 1998, and at the Osaka Festival Hall from August 15 to August 17, 1998. Total of 40 performances. The total number of performances reached 500. The fantastic story of a vampire who awakens from a 150-year sleep and travels to New York City with two retainers to find his bride.

==== Story ====
Summer 1998. When the young Vampire lord Katsuhide awakens from his 150-year sleep, a sudden engagement ceremony awaits him. If he doesn't, he will be forced to marry the man Mother Mauri (Mitsuko Mori, voice only) has chosen for him. There are five days until the time limit for the betrothal ceremony. Katsuhide flies to New York with Noriyuki and Kazukiyo, hoping to at least choose his own bride.

==== Cast/Staff ====
Cast	Kazukiyo Nishikiori as Kazukiyo, Vampire retainer; Katsuhide Uekusa as Prince of vampire who awakens after 150 years; Noriyuki Higashiyama as Noriyuki: Retainer of the vampire prince; Masayuki Sakamoto from 20th Century as James; Hiroshi Nagano from 20th Century as Willie, rich young man; Yoshihiko Inohara as Robert from 20th Century as a curious young man pursuing his dreams; Mitsuko Mori as Mother King, Mother Mauri; Mayumi Omura as Cindy Suzuki; Keimi Matsumoto as Martha Kawasaki
Staff	Screenplay - Akiko Takasu; Directed by Michiyo Morita

=== 1999 Playzone '99 Goodbye & Hello: The End of the Century, The New Century ===
Performed under the title of Playzone '99 Goodbye & Hello: The End of the Century, The New Century. It was performed at the Aoyama Theatre from July 11 to August 4, 1999, and at the Festival Hall from August 12 to August 15, 1999. A total of 41 performances. As Arashi held their debut press conference in September 1999, this performance was Satoshi Ohno's last appearance at Playzone as a member of Musical Academy.

==== Story ====
Twins left behind in a theater grow up to become big stars, but they are constantly fighting over their birth. The story is that the two eventually travel back in time, with their late father unexpectedly appearing as a ghost.

==== Cast/Staff ====
Cast	Kazukiyo Nishikiori as Kisuke: Twins left in front of a theater 32 years ago; Higashiyama Noriyuki as Reiji: twin left in front of the theater 32 years ago; Katsuhide Uekusa as Kosuke: The spirit of Kisuke and Reiji's real father; Masayuki Sakamoto from 20th Century as Udagawa: A rich man's son; Hiroshi Nagano from 20th Century as Okamoto: Theater staff; Yoshihiko Inohara from 20th Century as Shuichi: Top dancer
Staff	Screenplay by Akiko Takasu; Director, Choreography by Sanche; Director by Takuro Fukuda; Choreography by Travis Payne

=== 2000 Playzone '00 Theme Park ===
Performed under the title Playzone '00 Theme Park at the Aoyama Theatre from July 16 to August 10, 2000, and at the Festival Hall from August 14 to 20, 2000. It was performed at the Aoyama Theatre from July 16 to August 10, 2000, and at the Festival Hall from August 14 to 20, 2000. A total of 40 performances. The total number of performances reached 600.

==== Story ====
The show is set in a theme park commemorating the new millennium. With only two days until the opening, the men of the project team are drunk with the completion of their dream when an accident occurs, including the failure of the main computer.

==== Cast/Staff ====
Cast	Kazukiyo Nishikiori as Nitta: Producer; Katsuhide Uekusa as Ueyama: Stage director; Noriyuki Higashiyama as Hotta: Manager; Masayuki Sakamoto as Sasaoka, Middle East pavilion director; Hiroshi Nagano as Nagae; Production assistant for the pavilion. Assistant to Ueyama; Yoshihiko Inohara as Ikenishi: Assistant to the planner of the pavilion. Hotta's assistant
Staff	Screenplay Akiko Takasu; Director - Masaaki Eguchi; Choreography - Travis Payne, Luis Bravo, Atsushi Maeda, Hideboh

=== 2001 Playzone '01 New Century Emotion ===
The production was titled Playzone '01 New Century Emotion. It was performed at the Aoyama Theatre from July 14 to August 8, 2001, and at the Festival Hall from August 13 to 17, 2001. A total of 44 performances.

==== Story ====
The work was created with the first year of the 21st century in mind, and the story is set at a time when heaven and earth have just parted and features three young creators (Nishikiori, Higashiyama, and Uekusa) who have been given powers by God.

==== Cast/Staff ====
Cast	Kazukiyo Nishikiori as Three creators who aspire to become the Creator's successors. Their mission is to evolve into "Kare"; Katsuhide Uekusa as Three creators; Noriyuki Higashiyama as Three creators; Masahiro Matsuoka as "Mono" (triple cast); Yoshihiko Inohara as "Mono" (triple cast); Satoshi Ohno as "Mono" (triple cast): The first human prototype created, infused with human emotions by the Creators and evolving into "Kare"; Mitsuko Mori as showtime narrator
Staff	Screenplay - Kida Tsuyoshi; Director - Okamura Shunichi; Choreography - Travis Payne, Stacy Walker, Atsushi Maeda; Showtime choreographer - Sanche

=== 2002 Playzone '02 Aishi ===
Performed under the title Playzone '02 Aishi. It was performed at the Aoyama Theatre from July 14 to August 8, 2002, and at the Festival Hall from August 11 to August 15, 2002. A total of 42 performances were given. The total number of audiences exceeded 1 million.

==== Story ====
Solo, the greatest thief of all time, stole a gemstone called the Eye of Regulus from a museum. In pursuit of Solo, who was wanted, Interpol Captain Barnes shot down the plane Solo was in into a deep valley. The plane crashed into an uncharted area called the Valley of the Brave, where Solo survived but lost his memory. There, Solo saved a boy from drowning in the river and became known as a brave man. The boy was the prince of the village. The villagers ask the hero for help. Then Indah, who wants the jewels, Burns, who has been chasing Solo, and Chirano, an assassin who wants Solo's life, appear, and the village falls into chaos.

==== Cast/Staff ====
Cast	Kazukiyo Nishikiori as Burns: Police officer; Katsuhide Uekusa as Inda: Cameraman; Higashiyama Noriyuki as Solo: The greatest thief; Atsuhiro Sato as Chirano
Staff	Screenplay - Tsuyoshi Kida; Director - Shunichi Okamura; Choreography - Travis Payne, Stacy Walker, Atsushi Maeda

=== 2003 Playzone ’03 Vacation ===
Performed under the title of Playzone ’03 Vacation. It was performed at the Aoyama Theatre from July 14 to August 6, 2003, and at the Festival Hall from August 11 to August 17, 2003. A total of 40 performances. The total number of performances reached 700. Higashiyama later said that he broke his toe on the day of the 700th anniversary performance, but continued performing as he did, and that his mind was strengthened. He was able to turn with his heel and continued the show without treatment, but by the end of the month and a half performance, the bone had begun to attach.

==== Story ====
The story is in an omnibus format for the first time, with the story revolving around events that occur during each Shonentai member's Vacation.

==== Cast/Staff ====
Cast	Kazukiyo Nishikiori as U.S. intelligence officer CIA; Katsuhide Uekusa as U.S. federal agent FBI; Noriyuki Higashiyama as British secret agent MI6; Jun Akiyama from Musical Academy; Shingo Machida from Musical Academy; Takeshi Yonehana from Musical Academy; Tomoyuki Yara from Musical Academy; Toma Ikuta; Shunsuke Kazama
Staff	Screenplay - Kazunori Watanabe; Director - Shunichi Okamura; Choreography - Travis Payne, Stacy Walker, Atsushi Maeda; Showtime choreographer - Sanche

=== 2004 Playzone '04 West Side Story ===
Performed under the title Playzone '04 West Side Story. It was performed at the Aoyama Theatre from July 2 to August 5, 2004, and at the Festival Hall from August 9 to August 16, 2004. A total of 51 performances. Due to copyright issues, the Broadway productions have not been made into CDs or videos, as is customary in the Playzone series, and the "Shonentai 35th Anniversary Playzone Box 1986-2008" released in 2020 was the only Playzone production not to be included. It was the only Playzone work not to be included in the Playzone Box 1986-2008, which was released in 2020. Uekusa was puzzled by the difference in the way the stage was created from the previous ones, with a world-class director deciding all the casting, etc. He said that the preparation was difficult because in Japan, the process usually begins with a standing rehearsal, while overseas people start by explaining the background of the cast, for example, making them understand racial and religious issues. Moreover, since Nishikiori was playing an enemy at that time, the director told him, "Don't even go to the meshi together; go with your allies." He was told to be thorough in preparing for his role.

==== Cast/Staff ====
Cast	Kazukiyo Nishikiori as Riff: Leader of the Jet; Katsuhide Uekusa as Bernardo: Leader of the Shark; Noriyuki Higashiyama as Tony: Riff's best friend, used to be a member of the Jet. Falls in love with Maria; Atsuhiro Sato as Chino: Bernardo's best friend; Akira Akasaka as Action; Toma Ikuta as A-Rab; Yoshikazu Toushin as Baby John; Kaho Shimada as Maria: Bernardo's sister; Tatsuki Kaju as Anita: Bernardo's girlfriend
Staff	Director, Choreography by Joey McKneely; Translation, Lyricist by Yasuhiko Katsuda

=== 2005 Playzone '05 - 20th Anniversary - Twenty Years ... and into the future we have yet to see ===
Performed under the title of Playzone '05 - 20th Anniversary - Twenty Years ... and into the future we have yet to see. The show ran from July 6 - August 4, 2005 (Aoyama Theatre) and August 13–17, 2005 (Osaka Festival Hall) for a total of 44 performances to celebrate the 20th anniversary. During the performances, a 30-meter-long welcome gate costing 50 million yen was installed at the theater entrance, a giant cake-shaped object decorated with "20" was placed in the lobby, and candles with the names of the performers were placed. 800 performances in total were given at the evening performance on July 14, The total number of audience members reached 1,172,436, and Masahiko Kondo, TOKIO, KinKi Kids, V6, Mitsuko Mori, Tetsuko Kuroyanagi, and others came to celebrate the event. With the final performance, the total number of performances was 832, and the total audience attendance was 1,219,900.

==== Story ====
The story is about a group of boys who are rehearsing for their first day on stage, but are trapped in a time capsule named "the past" by a messenger sent from the future. The show also includes footage, theme songs, and dialogue from the first production Playzone '86 Mystery to last year's Playzone '04 West Side Story to look back on the history of the show, and as a highlight of this year's show, Higashiyama jumped from a height of 25 meters several times while moving 20 meters sideways across the theater ceiling.

==== Cast ====
Cast/Staff	Kazukiyo Nishikiori as Nishikiori; Katsuhide Uekusa as Uekusa; Higashiyama Noriyuki as Higashiyama; Atsuhiro Sato as Atsuhiro: Messenger sent from the future to erase the achievements of the boy band; Akira Akasaka as Akasaka: judge. Messenger from the future.; Musical Academy; Kis-My-Ft.; A.B.C.; Johnny's Jr.
Staff	Director by Johnny Kitagawa; Choreography by Sanche, Devanand Janki、Hideboh; stage design by Tomoko Nakamura

=== 2006 Playzone '06 Change ===
Performed under the title Playzone '06 Change. It ran for 40 performances from July 9 - August 5, 2006. For the first time, Shunichi Okamura was in charge of both writing and directing. In addition, director and choreographer Vincent Patterson became involved in the production, avoiding flying, etc., and specializing in dance, song, and theatrical direction. The dances were more intense and the message was stronger, and the characters were more carefully portrayed as crazy, unstable, and lovable, creating a humorous and serious story.

==== Story ====
Nishikori, Higashiyama and Uekusa, who were industrial spies, had a history 10 years ago when they failed to steal from a certain laboratory, causing the death of a fellow junior employee. Nishikori is summoned by a mysterious boy and asked to steal again what he failed to steal 10 years ago. The three are reunited, accept the request and head off to "work"...

==== Cast/Staff ====
Cast	Kazukiyo Nishikiori as former industrial spy; Katsuhide Uekusa as former industrial spy; Noriyuki Higashiyama as former industrial spy; Atsuhiro Sato as Atsuhiro: He was an associate of the industrial spy played by Shonentai, but failed in his mission and died.; Akira Akasaka as Akasaka: a lonely researcher who is pursuing experiments that "overturn the laws of life.; Jun Hasegawa as Jun: A mysterious boy who asks Shonentai to steal samples from the lab.
Staff	Writer/director by Shunichi Okamura; Director and choreographer by Vincent Paterson

=== 2007 Playzone '07 Change 2 Chance ===
Performed under the title of Playzone '07 Change 2 Chance. It was performed from July 9 to September 7, 2007, for 40 performances. From this year, the Osaka production was performed at the Umeda Arts Theatre. The production reached a total of 900 performances. Hiroki Uchihiroki and Hiroki Kusano, who had been trainees, returned to the company, and Uekusa's son, Yuta Uekusa, made his acting debut at the age of 12. There were originally plans to release a DVD, but since Akira Akasaka, who performed in the show, was fired from his office after the show, the release was cancelled, but it was made into a video for the first time in the Shonentai 35th Anniversary Playzone Box 1986-2008 on December 12, 2020.

==== Story ====
The story is about a teacher at a free school who tries to solve the problems of her closed-minded student Ken with a detective acquaintance and a cosmetic surgeon. With the theme of love, the film asks whether human beings can be reborn without being bound by the past. In a departure from the first act, which is clearly fiction, the second act reflects the personal histories of the participating members and encourages Ken by recounting the anguish and turning points that the main characters have experienced.

==== Cast ====
Cast	Kazukiyo Nishikiori as Nishikiori: Free school teacher; Katsuhide Uekusa as Uekusa: Detective; Noriyuki Higashiyama as Higashiyama: Plastic surgeon; Atsuhiro Sato as Atsuhiro; Akira Akasaka as Ken's father

=== 2008 Shonentai Playzone Final 1986-2008 Show Time Hit Series Change ===
Performed under the title Shonentai Playzone Final 1986-2008 Show Time Hit Series Change. It was performed from July 6 to August 8, 2008 (Aoyama Theatre) and from August 26 to August 31, 2008 (Umeda Arts Theatre), with a total of 45 performances and 55,335 audiences. The show was the last Playzone starring Shonentai, and was a retrospective of the group's 23-year history, with songs from previous Playzone shows and a medley of Shonentai hits. The three members in tuxedos performed two songs, "Kamen Butokai" and "Baby Baby Baby", and the fan send-off event was held for the first time ever on a special outdoor stage in front of the theater.

==== Cast ====
Cast	Kazukiyo Nishikiori; Katsuhide Uekusa; Noriyuki Higashiyama; Tomoyuki Yara; Johnny's Jr.

=== 2009 Playzone 2009: A Letter From The Sun ===
Performed under the title of Playzone 2009: Letter From The Sun. It was performed from July 11 to August 9, 2009 (Aoyama Theatre) for 38 performances and from August 21 to August 26, 2009 (Umeda Arts Theater) for 10 performances, for a total of 48 performances. This was the first new Playzone starring Johnny's Jr. after Playzone starring Shonentai ended. It consisted of two parts, a musical and a show, with a total of 75 Johnny's Jr. members performing. The musical was written and directed by Kazukiyo Nishikiori. The musical part tells the story of a group of young people participating in a "Summer festival" who overcome their internal dissonance to create a show. Nishikori directs the production, and his idea of a gag part is woven into various parts of the show.

==== Story ====
The story of a group of young people participating in a "Summer festival" who overcome their internal dissonance to create a show. Fujigaya, who wants to explore entertainment, and Uchi, who wants to pursue expression in the band, are at odds with each other, which annoys everyone in the troupe. However, they were best friends as children. As they practise to make the stage a success, they make up. In the second act, they perform the completed show.

==== Cast ====
Cast	Hiromitsu Kitayama(triple lead); Taisuke Fujigaya(triple lead); Yuta Tamamori (triple lead); Kento Senga; Toshiya Miyata; Wataru Yokoo; Takashi Nikaido; Hiroki Uchi; Tomoyuki Yara: plays a lubricating role
Staff	Written and directed by Kazukiyo Nishikiori; Choreography by Sanche, Etsuko Kawasaki, Seiji

=== 2010 Road to Playzone 2010 ===
Performed under the title Road to Playzone 2010. It ran for 33 performances from July 9 to August 1, 2010 (Aoyama Theatre) and 11 performances from August 14 to August 22, 2010 (Umeda Arts Theatre), for a total of 44 performances. Tsubasa Imai of Tackey & Tsubasa was selected to play the lead role from this performance. Travis Payne will be in charge of the choreography, the sixth time in total that Travis choreographed for Playzone. In addition, new cast members have been recruited, including Tomoyuki Yara, who has had a long stage career, Johnny's Jr.'s group A.B.C-Z, Shintaro Morimoto, They Budo and M.A.D. and Yuma Nakayama also makes a special appearance. A group of exotic juvenile delinquents (including Yuma Nakayama) encounter a show by Tsubasa Imai and Tomoyuki Yara and dream of performing on the same stage. They pass the audition, but just before the show, one of the group is taken away by the police, and the boys are torn between performing on stage and friendship.

==== Story ====
The story is about a group of bad boys living in a slum. They enter the theater to steal, but happen to see a show and are impressed. They then auditioned to get on stage and change their lives.

==== Cast ====
Cast	Tsubasa Imai; Tomoyuki Yara; Fumito Kawai from A.B.C-Z; Koichi Goseki from A.B.C-Z; Shota Totsuka from A.B.C-Z; Ryouichi Tsukada from A.B.C-Z; Ryosuke Hashimoto from A.B.C-Z; Shintaro Morimoto; Yuma Nakayama (special appearance)
Staff	Choreography by Travis Payne

=== 2011 Playzone'11 Song & Danc'N. ===
Performed under the title Playzone'11 Song & Danc'N., 30 performances July 8 - August 7, 2011 (Aoyama Theater), 4 performances August 19–21, 2011 (Chunichi Theater, Aichi), 6 performances August 28–31, 2011 (Umeda Arts Theater, Osaka), 40 performances total. There was no drama except for the story-dance sections, and the performance consisted only of 22 songs, including Masahiko Kondō's song "Gin Gira Gin ni Sarigenaku" (ja), KinKi Kids's song "Garasu no Shōnen," (ja) and "Guyz Playzone," which was written especially for this year's performance, and various dances from jazz to hip-hop. The choreography was done by Travis Payne, the same as last year. During the performance, photos of the cast members in their childhood were shown along with footage of "Playzone" from the first performance. During a performance on July 23, Fumito Kawai of Johnny's Jr. broke his left leg when he jumped off the movable stage, and he missed the rest of the performance.

==== Cast ====
Cast	Tsubasa Imai; Yuma Nakayama; Tomoyuki Yara; Fumito Kawai from A.B.C-Z; Koichi Goseki from A.B.C-Z; Shota Totsuka from A.B.C-Z; Ryouichi Tsukada from A.B.C-Z; Ryosuke Hashimoto from A.B.C-Z; Yuta Fukuda from 4U; Yudai Tatsumi from 4U; Hiroki Koshioka from 4U; Yusuke Matsuzaki from 4U
Staff	Choreography by Travis Payne

=== 2012 Playzone'12 Song & Danc'N. PartII ===
Performed under the title Playzone'12 Song & Danc'N. PartII. July 9 - August 11, 2012, for a total of 36 performances (Aoyama Theater). It stars Tsubasa Imai. In addition to the usual members such as Yuma Nakayama, Tomoyuki Yara and 4U, former Hikaru Genji member Atsuhiro Sato appeared like an older brother. Following last year, Travis Payne and Stacey Walker supervised the dancing, and Sato performed his speciality, roller-skating dancing. In order to regain her roller dance instincts, Sato practised since early spring.

==== Cast ====
Cast	Tsubasa Imai; Yuma Nakayama; Yuki Koshioka from 4U; Yudai Tatsumi from 4U; Yuta Fukuda from 4U; Yusuke Matsuzaki from 4U; Noel Kawashima from Travis Japan; Miyuto Morita from Travis Japan; Hiroki Nakata from Travis Japan; Tatsuya Shimekake from Travis Japan; Kaito Nakamura from Travis Japan; Kaito Miyachika from Travis Japan; Shizuya Yoshizawa from Travis Japan; Asahi Kajiyama from Travis Japan; Alan Abe from Travis Japan; Tomoyuki Yara; Atsuhiro Sato
Staff	Choreography by Travis Payne

=== 2013 Playzone'13 Song & Danc'N. PartIII. ===
Performed under the title Playzone'13 Song & Danc'N. PartIII. from July 3 - August 10, 2013 at the Aoyama Theater for a total of 40 performances. As in the previous year, Travis Payne choreographed the show, and Yara also choreographed two songs. This year's production was more song-and-dance oriented and, with the exception of the stage theme song, the entire program consisted of Japanese hit songs. In addition to 22 songs by 16 groups, including "Kejimenasai" by Masahiko Kondo and "Kamen Butōkai" by Shonentai, Imai performed Hideaki Takizawa's solo song "Love, Revolution" and there was a scene where Nakayama performed "Missing Piece" choreographed by Yara. There was also a scene in which a sweaty Imai left the stage in the middle of the performance and borrowed a handkerchief from the audience.

==== Cast ====
Cast	Tsubasa Imai; Yuma Nakayama; Yuta Fukuda from 4U; Yudai Tatsumi from 4U; Hiroki Koshioka from 4U; Yusuke Matsuzaki from 4U; Hiroki Nakata from Travis Japan; Noel Kawashima from Travis Japan; Ryuya Shichigosangake from Travis Japan; Miyuto Morita from Travis Japan; Shizuya Yoshizawa from Travis Japan; Kaito Nakamura from Travis Japan; Alan Abe from Travis Japan; Asahi Kajiyama from Travis Japan; Tomoyuki Yara

=== 2014 (January) Playzone -> In Nissay ===
Performed under the title Playzone -> In Nissay, January 6–28, 2014, for a total of 30 performances (Nissei Theatre). Starring Tsubasa Imai. The content is based on last year's Playzone'13 Song & Danc'N. PartIII.. Prezon has been performed every summer since its premiere in 1986, but this was the first time it was performed at the Nissay Theatre for January. The cast remains the same as last time, including Tsubasa Imai, Yuma Nakayama and Tomoyuki Yara. Newly added to the programme were songs such as "Whatever Will Happen, It's Bad", sung by the Shonentai in the 1992 performance.

==== Cast ====
Cast	Tsubasa Imai; Tomoyuki Yara; Yuma Nakayama; Yuta Fukuda from 4U; Yudai Tatsumi from 4U; Hiroki Koshioka from 4U; Yusuke Matsuzaki from 4U; Hiroki Nakata from Travis Japan; Noel Kawashima from Travis Japan; Ryuya Shimekake from Travis Japan; Miyuto Morita from Travis Japan; Shizuya Yoshizawa from Travis Japan; Kaito Nakamura from Travis Japan; Aran Abe from Travis Japan; Asahi Kajiyama from Travis Japan
Staff	Directed by Johnny Kitagawa; Choreographed by Travis Payne, Stacy Walker, Mari Akasaka, Tomoyuki Yara; Stage design by Masako Ito, Kei Ishihara; Composed by Masaru Shoji

=== 2014 (July) Playzone 1986...2014 Thank you! Aoyama Theatre ===
Performed under the title Playzone 1986...2014 Thank you! Aoyama Theatre, performed July 6 - August 9, 2014, for a total of 43 performances (Aoyama Theatre). The show began with "Diamond Eyes" by Shonentai, the performers, led by Tsubasa Imai, sang and danced to Johnny's past hits, directed and choreographed by Travis Payne and Stacey Walker. Imai sang a Tackey & Tsubasa song with Yuma Nakayama, and he and Tomoyuki Yara sang a Shonentai's song. In addition, 4U, They Budo, "MAD" and Travis Japan performed a sometimes serious, sometimes comical stage performance, and all the performers at the end of the show danced hard to "Road To Playzone" and "Guys Playzone".

==== Cast/Staff ====
Cast	Tsubasa Imai; Yuma Nakayama; Hiroki Koshioka from 4U; Yudai Tatsumi from 4U; Yuta Fukuda from 4U; Yusuke Matsuzaki from 4U; Noel Kawashima from Travis Japan; Myuto Morita from Travis Japan; Hiroki Nakata from Travis Japan; Tatsuya Shimekake from Travis Japan; Kaito Nakamura from Travis Japan; Kaito Miyachika from Travis Japan; Shizuya Yoshizawa from Travis Japan; Asahi Kajiyama; Tomoyuki Yara
Staff	General supervisor by Johnny Kitagawa; Directed and Choreographed by Travis Payne; Stage design by Masako Ito; Composed by Masaru Shoji

=== 2015 Good-bye! Aoyama Theatre: Playzone 30years, 1232 Performances ===
Performed under the title of Good-bye! Aoyama Theatre: Playzone 30years, 1232 Performances performed January 6–22, 2015, 24 performances in total (Aoyama Theatre). This year's show was entitled "Good-bye! Aoyama Theatre", and at the end of the show, all of the past Johnny's performers who have been a part of the production for the past 30 years appeared in a video. In addition to the three members of Shonentai, Tokio, Satoshi Ohno of Arashi, Ryo Nishikido of Kanjani Eight and others appeared and sent their farewells to the Aoyama Theatre in the video. Imai, the lead actor, was diagnosed with Ménière's disease in November 2014 and was hospitalised until early December. Imai also took a break from his concert tour in the same month. This is his full-fledged return, and he stressed that his physical condition is "mostly fine". However, partly on doctor's orders, he has reduced the number of songs from 18 or 19 to 11, which was originally planned. Once again, "Road to Playzone", "Light and Guys Playzone", directed by Travis Payne and choreographed by Stacey Walker, were performed by the entire cast at the end of the show.

==== Cast ====
Cast	Tsubasa Imai; Yuma Nakayama; Hiroki Koshioka from 4U; Yudai Tatsumi from 4U; Yuta Fukuda from 4U; Yusuke Matsuzaki from 4U; Noel Kawashima from Travis Japan; Miyuto Morita from Travis Japan; Hiroki Nakata from Travis Japan; Tatsuya Shimekake from Travis Japan; Kaito Nakamura from Travis Japan; Kaito Miyachika from Travis Japan; Shizuya Yoshizawa from Travis Japan; Asahi Kajiyama from Travis Japan; Tomoyuki Yara
Staff	General supervisor by Johnny Kitagawa; Directed and Choreographed by Travis Payne; Stage design by Masako Ito; Composed by Masaru Shoji

== Distribution ==
On November 22, 1997, Johnny's Entertainment (currently Elov-label) re-released 11 titles from the Playzone series (1–11) on VHS in paper packages (plastic case for 11 only). Except for "Rhythm," each film includes the members' comments on the film before the main feature, and the performer/producer credits at the end of the film are replaced with a digest of the main feature. Playzone's related products were released by Warner Pioneer for cassette tapes and CDs, and by Pony Canyon for videos. After November 22, 1997, both CDs, videos, and DVDs were released by Johnny's Entertainment.

	Title	Soundtrack	VHS	DVD	Box-set
1	Playzone Mystery	October 30, 1986(CT); March 8, 1986(CD)	September 5, 1986	-	Yes
2	Playzone'87 Time-19	October 28, 1987	November 22, 1987	-	Yes
3	Playzone'88 Capriccio －A Rhapsody of Angels and Demons－	June 10, 1988	August 21, 1988	-	Yes
4	Playzone'89 Again	September 21, 1989	September 21, 1989	-	Yes
5	Playzone'90 Impact Masks	June 30, 1990	September 12, 1990	-	Yes
6	Playzone'91 Shock	-	September 26, 1991	-	Yes
7	Playzone'92 Goodbye Diary	-	October 7, 1992	-	Yes
8	Playzone'93 Window	-	October 6, 1993	-	Yes
9	Playzone'94 Moon	June 17, 1994	October 7, 1994	-	Yes
10	Playzone'95 King & Joker	-	October 4, 1995	-	Yes
11	Playzone'96 Rhythm	July 10, 1997	October 2, 1996	-	Yes
12	Playzone'97 Rhythm2	July 21, 1997	October 22, 1997	-	Yes
13	Playzone 1998 5night's	August 5, 1998	October 28, 1998	-	Yes
14	Playzone 1999 Goodbye&Hello	July 7, 1999	October 20, 1999	-	Yes
15	Playzone 2000 Theme Park	August 2, 2000	October 25, 2000	-	Yes
16	Playzone 2001 Emotion-New century-	August 1, 2001	-	October 24, 2001	Yes
17	Playzone 2002 Beloved history	July 31, 2002	-	October 23, 2002	Yes
18	Playzone 2003 Vacation	August 6, 2003	-	October 22, 2003	Yes
19	Playzone 2004 West Side Story	-	-	-	No
20	Playzone 2005 20th Anniversary:Twenty Years...And to a future yet to be seen.	August 10, 2005	-	October 29, 2005	Yes
21	Playzone 2006 Change	October 24, 2006	-	July 26, 2006	Yes
22	Playzone 2007 Change 2 Chance	September 5, 2007	-	-	Yes
23	Playzone Final 1986-2008 Show Time Hit Series Change	-	-	March 4, 2009	Yes
24	Playzone 2009 A Letter from the Sun	August 26, 2009	-	December 2, 2009	No
25	Playzone 2010 Road To Playzone	July 28, 2010	-	November 10, 2010	No
26	Playzone'11 Song & Danc'n.	July 20, 2011	-	November 2, 2011	No
27	Playzone'12 Song & Danc'n. Part2	July 19, 2012	-	October 31, 2012	No
28	Playzone'13 Song & Danc'n. Part3	July 3, 2013	-	November 7, 2013	No
29	Playzone 1986････2014 Thank you Aoyama Theatre!	July 30, 2014	-	November 26, 2014	No
30	Good-bye! Aoyama Theatre Playzone 30Years 1232 Performances	-	-	July 1, 2015	No

== See also ==
- Shock, annual Musical starring Koichi Domoto, performed from 2000 to 2024.
- Dream Boy, a Musical about boxing that has continued since 2004 with different stars of Johnny & Associates and Starto Entertainment.
- Boys (Japanese musical), a series of musicals set in a juvenile prison, premiered in 1969.
- Shonentai
