= Kazukiyo Nishikiori =

Japanese actor, theatre director (born 1965)

- 錦織 一清
- Born: May 22, 1965 (age 61); Setagaya, Tokyo, Japan
- Occupations: Theatre director; Actor
- Agent(s): Freelance (2021–present); Johnny & Associates (1977–2020)
- Musical career
- Also known as: Nicky, Nishiki
- Genre: J-pop
- Occupation: Singer
- Years active: 1978–present
- Label: Uncle Cinnamon / Gotown Records
- Member of: Funky Diamond 18
- Formerly of: Shonentai
- Website: Unclecinnamon Official Web; Kazukiyo Nishikiori on X; Uncle Cinnamon TV's channel on YouTube; Nicky and Kacchanel's channel on YouTube with Katsuhide Uekusa

Kazukiyo Nishikiori (錦織 一清, Nishikiori Kazukiyo; born May 22, 1965) is a Japanese theatre director and actor. He is a freelancer.

Until 2020, he belonged to Johnny & Associates and was a member of the boy band Shonentai.

He is best known for starring in Fall Guy (1999) and for directing Ode to Joy (2018).

== History ==
=== Childhood (1965–1977) ===
Nishikiori was born in 1965 in Setagaya, Tokyo, and moved to Edogawa, Tokyo when he was two years old due to his father's work. Edogawa is an area known as Shitamachi and is located in the eastern part of Tokyo.

His father worked for a company that printed album cover of phonograph record and his mother was a nurse. He was sickly and weak, so his father bought records with the company's employee discount and played him a lot of music when he was often absent from school, and his mother raised him to take good care of his health. However, he said his body naturally became stronger as he played freely outside.

He was so athletic that when he was a kindergartener he could naturally do backflips while playing in his sister's primary school gym. Therefore, when he was a child, he wanted to become a physical education teacher in the future.

In Edogawa, their family initially lived in an apartment without a bath. He loved the local folksy atmosphere and liked to go to the Sentō, a public bath, with his friends, even after his family moved to a rental house with a bath. As a child, his father often took him not to amusement parks but to yose, horse racing and Keirin. He enjoyed seeing the many unique adults there.

His sister was a fan of Johnny's Four Leaves and Hiromi Go, who were active on TV at the time. In July 1977, when Nishikiori was in the sixth grade, his sister sent his resume to Johnny & Associates and he took the audition. At the time, before the Tanokin Trio broke through, Johnny's was in a slump and only seven or eight people showed up for the audition. Nishikiori had no dance experience, but he danced as he saw fit. However, there was one step he just couldn't do, and when he was frustrated, Johnny Kitagawa appeared and told him "You are a genius." He later said it was the first and last time he had ever been freely praised him by Kitagawa.

He passed an audition and joined the Johnny & Associates. Katsuhide Uekusa, a member of Shonentai, later said that when he first met Nishikiori, others introduced him as a genius. Nishikiori did backflips so lightly in front of the onlookers that the others began practising backflips frantically, imitating him. At the time, Kitagawa knew that he wanted to be a physical education teacher in the future, but he did not specifically tell him to become a celebrity, he just took him to various movies and shows.

=== Early career (1978–1984) ===
As a trainee, Nishikiori appeared as an actor in an educational film Good-bye My Dog Rocky in 1978. The film was a short film about a boy who lives with and raises a guide dog from puppy to ten months of age before parting with him. He said that because he started his career as an actor, he initially wanted to be a film star, as did several senior members of Johnny's.

At Johnny's, he met Noriyuki Higashiyama and Katsuhide Uekusa, who would later form Shonentai. Higashiyama had a shaved head and looked like Masao Ohba, a boxer active at the time, while Uekusa was impressive because his family was wealthy and he had an oilcloth red bag, as if he was already a celebrity. Nishikiori was particularly friendly with Higashiyama and they sometimes went to the movies together.

After their time as trainees, he formed Shonentai with Higashiyama and Uekusa in 1982. Initially a back-up dancer for Masahiko Kondo and Toshihiko Tahara. Shonentai appeared on singing shows, singing hit songs by other singers of the time, and even gave concert performances five times a day.

They gradually gained popularity even before their debut. At the time, Kitagawa scolded him for caring only about fashion and appearance, and told him to hone his performing skills more. Prior to their debut, Shonentai were given the opportunity to perform at Bloomingdale's, a department store in New York City. The experience of singing and dancing in front of an audience of different languages and cultures made him determined to further improve his performing skills.

At the end of 1984, Nishikiori made a direct appeal to Mary Fujishima, Kitagawa's elder sister, at the 1984 year-end party for Johnny's, asking her to let him make his debut, even if it was on a flexi disc. Then six months later he was informed that their debut had been confirmed.

=== Debut as Shonentai (1985–2020) ===
On December 12, 1985, Shonentai made their record debut with Kamen Butokai. Nishikori has a well-balanced combination of singing, dancing, and acting abilities, and Kitagawa described him as "a masterpiece of Johnny's." He was also the leader of Shonentai because he was older and had a longer performing career than the other members.

After his debut, he began to appear on television singing shows, and when he wore flamboyant costumes, such as sequined elastic wrapped around his head, he sometimes worried that he might lose friends if his local friends saw this.

Their debut song "Kamen Butokai" is said to have been reworked many times before its completion, and the phrase "Tonight ya ya ya... tear" at the beginning of the song was invented by Nishikiori. He was known for coming up with different ideas when working on new songs. It has no particular meaning, but was adopted as a catchy phrase that was pleasant to the ear. The phrase "Wakachiko" in their second single "Decameron Densetsu" (The Legend of Decameron) also has no particular meaning, but he liked Japanese band called Spectrum at the time, and was inspired by their debut song, in which they say "Wacchikon" during the interlude.

Nishikiori is currently known for telling amusing stories and jokes, but according to him, he was not an interesting person at the time of his debut and was scolded by Kitagawa, who said, "Your stage banter is not fun. To entertain the audience not only with cool singing and dancing, but also with talk, he says he honed his talk skills by referring to Kenji Sawada, who was a popular with his singing and talking at the time. Later, he became known for telling jokes in interviews.

==== As an actor ====
After his debut, he worked as an individual actor in parallel with his group activities as Shonentai. In 1988, he played a boxer in the lead role of Golden Boy, a play that originated in the United States. His co-stars were all stars, including veteran actors Isao Bito and Tokuma Nishioka, so he was under a lot of pressure.

In the TV series, he played the lead role for the first time in 1988 in In the Night Sky After the Bath. As Shonentai became popular, he began to work on more and more movies and TV series, but he says he preferred working in the play rehearsal hall with the cast and crew on the stage work to working on a film, where the actors are often shot separately, and he thought that might be his true calling.

Then, in 1995, he began to concentrate on theater work when he began working as a theatre director parallel to appear as an actor in the musical Playzone by Shonentai.

==== As a theatre director ====
Nishikiori said that he has two mentors, and that his mentor in show creation and his starting point as a director was Johnny Kitagawa. And in theatre direction, he said he was strongly influenced by Kohei Tsuka. They both said they always watched the actors offstage and gave detailed instructions to them, which was common to both of them.

Kitagawa was not concerned with reality in his stage productions and always pursued entertainment, and said, "I am the one who creates the fads," and he never followed the trends. The plays he created in this way were always interesting and never out of date. This way of thinking had a strong influence on Nishikiori.

Nishikiori first became interested in Kohei Tsuka when he was in high school and read one of Tsuka's books and he saw the film Fall Guy, one of Tsuka's best-known works. He awakened his interest in theater, and he staged and directed this theatre production at his high school's school festival.

Tsuka's this theatre production had been performed since 1980, and Nishikiori played the lead role of Ginshiro in 1999, and again in 2000 and 2006. During this time, he was under the tutelage of Tsuka and was deeply influenced by him. Nishikiori is said to have been recognized by Tsuka as "the second generation of director Kohei Tsuka," and after Tsuka's death, he was hired as the first person from outside the company to direct and teach workshops at Tsuka's theater company, Kita-ku AKT Stage in 2016. Nishikiori directed the musical productions Ode to Joy and Setouchi Koshinkyoku at the Botchan Theatre, Tōon city, Ehime Prefecture, for two consecutive years starting in 2018.

Although the Botchan Theater is a small regional theater in Shikoku, it is the only theater in Japan that stages self-produced musicals for a full year, and has attracted a total of 900,000 people since its opening in 2006. In 2018, Ode to Joy won the Family Musical Award at the 2018 All About Musical Awards. This production was performed again at the Bocchan Theater as well as in Tokyo in 2019.

=== 2021 Leaving Johnny's, independence ===
On December 31, 2020, he left Johnny & Associates and became freelancer. Since then, he has been active as a theater director and an actor. The major reason he left Johnny's was the death of Johnny Kitagawa in July 2019. Kitagawa, whom he had been able to consult about anything about his work, had died, and the company became a very large company with several hundred people, unlike when Nishikiori was young and it was a small company with a few dozen people.

He preferred to continue working in the field, so he was not interested in working as an office executive like Hideaki Takizawa or Yoshihiko Inohara, who were being talked about at the time. He said that since he was almost 60 years old, he wanted to be independent and do what he wanted to do. Nishikiori also compared this big company to a ship and said that as a crew member of this big ship, when he wondered if there would be room for him in the future, he decided to quit thinking that there would not be.

Although they did not discuss it, Katsuhide Uekusa, another member of Shonentai, also left the Johnny's at the same time, triggered by Kitagawa's death. In September 2021, he and Uekusa launched the YouTube channel "Nicky and Kacchanel", and the following year, they held a dinner theater.

In April 2021, Nishikiori launched his official fan club, Uncle Cinnamon Club, and in 2022, he founded Uncle Cinnamon Inc. The reason why it is Cinnamon is because in Japanese, Cinnamon is also called Nikki, which is similar to his nickname.

In 2022, Nishikiori acted for the first time in five years in Salaryman Night Fever, a play he wrote and directed. The reason for focusing on office workers was that when he used to perform in Yurakucho about 20 years ago, the audience was mostly women, and his old local friend asked him, "Is there any theater that we can go see more casually?"

After COVID-19 pandemic, he also became interested in contributing to society. He said he wanted to create a production that would cheer up office workers of his age who commute on crowded trains every day, are made sarcastic remarks by their bosses, and are kept at a distance by their daughters when they go home. In an interview with 2023, Nishikiori had been working in show business and doing the singing and dancing he loved, but after he turned 40, he was not sure if it was contributing to society, and considered retiring from his job. However, after the COVID-19 pandemic, he said that seeing Wahaha Honpo, a comedy troupe, doing their best to make the audience laugh made him decide that this was the only thing he could do, and that he would continue to do this work.

He said he became independent after his idol days and wanted to compete as a theater director in a place where no one knew who he was, and that he is now closer to his original self when he lived Shitamachi and before he entered show business.

In October 2023, regarding the sexual abuse scandal involving Johnny Kitagawa, Nishikiori stated that while he found the abuse disappointing, he still regarded Kitagawa as his mentor and hoped to carry forward the positive aspects of what he had learned.

== Musical activities ==
Since leaving the Johnny's, Nishikiori has been freely performing music without being restricted to a group. In 2021, he began his solo music career, launching the independent label Uncle Cinnamon Records and his new single Cafe Uncle Cinnamon and Song for you were released simultaneously on October 29, 2021. This was his first solo release in about 27 years, and the first since he left the institute. In 2022, he and Uekusa held a dinner theater in Tokyo and Osaka, where they entertained the audience with songs from the Shonentai era and a talk mixed with jokes between the two. In 2023, he launched a new project "Funky Diamond 18 (Funky Diamond One Eight)" with Papaya Suzuki, a classmate of his high school, and released a mini album Primemax on July 12, followed by a nationwide live tour Live Tour 2023 Primemax in four cities throughout Japan.

== Awards and nominations ==
Year	Work	Award	Category	Result	Ref.
2018	Ode to Joy	All About Musical Awards	Family Musical Award	Won	

== Filmography ==
=== Films ===
Year	Title	Role	Notes	Ref.
1978	Good-bye My Dog Rocky	A boy	Leading role	(Note: The lead roles were played by three boys who played third graders, and Nishikiori played one of them in the winter of sixth grade.)
1991	!<Ai·Oo>	Keisuke Tsujikawa		
1993	The Last of the Lion Kings	Tomohiro Eguchi	Starring with Show Aikawa	
1994	Fatal Fury: The Motion Picture	Terry Bogard		

=== TV series (selected) ===
Year	Title	Role	Notes	Ref.
1982	Tōge no Gunzō	Ichigaku Shimizu	Taiga drama ep.22, 27, 29–31, 38, 41–45, 47	
1987	In the Night Sky After the Bath	Tatsuyoshi Matsui	Leading role	
1991–1993	Yotaro Otani Mystery Drama Special	Detective Norio Muraoka	4 special dramas	
1992	Ganryujima Kojiro and Musashi	Ukon Sugiyama	New year SP drama	
1992	Pole Position! Dear my love	Kosuke Kashiwagi		
1993	Hotel Doctor	Namihiko Hayama		
1993, 1994–1995	Stray Doctor, Your Life Entrusted to Me!	Toji Kobayashi	1 SP drama and 1 season	
2004	Art Theater Spring Fireflies	Hikaru Sugawara	Leading role	
2004–2007	Wataru Seken wa Oni Bakari	Yasushi Kikukawa	2 seasons	
2006	The Dreaming Grapes: A Woman Who Reads Books 8; Maki's Matchmaking	Yoshiro Takase		
2009	Special News Reporter: Kohei Kamon's Murder Report	Kohei Kamon	Leading role	
2013	Worst Graduation Ceremony	Tatsuhiko Nomura		

== Theatre ==
=== Theatre play ===
Year	Title	Role	Theatre	Notes
1988	Golden Boy	Joe	Sound Coliseum MZA, Mielparque Tokyo	Leading role
1989–1990	The Sting	Johnny Hooker	Bunkamura	
1993	Mrs. Chatterley's Lover	Mellers Mori Ban	Nissay Theatre	
1993	Lady, Be Good!	Dick Trevor	Aoyama Theatre	
1995	The People of the Pier	Baptiste the Clown	Imperial Theatre	
1996	Scarlet	Father Coram	Imperial Theatre	
1997	The Tale of Genji; A Tale of the Three Girls	Kashiwagi	Imperial Theatre	
1997, 1999, 2000, 2002	42nd Street	Julian Marsh Jr.	Imperial Theatre, Chunichi Theatre	
1999	Carmen	Don Jose	Aoyama Theatre, Chunichi Theatre, Umeda Arts Theater	
1999, 2000, 2006	Fall Guy	Ginshiro Kuraoka	Kintetsu Theatre, Bunkamura, Aoyama Theatre, Theatre Brava	Leading role
2002	Charlie Girl	Joe Studhome	Aoyama Theatre, Chunichi Theatre, Umeda Arts Theater	
2004	Cabaret	Emcee	Tokyo Globe Theatre, Zepp Osaka	
2007	Ed's Ball	Gonpei Yamamoto	Misono-za, Meiji-za	
2008	Rose's Dilemma	Gavin Clancy	Le Theatre Ginza, Umeda Arts Theater	
2009	Okawa Watari	Ginji	Chunichi Theatre	Leading role
2009, 2010, 2011, 2012	New Year Takizawa Revolution	Special Appearance	Imperial Theatre	
2010	New Year Revolution of Life	Special Appearance	Imperial Theatre	
2010	Guys & Dolls	Nathan Detroit	Theatre Creation	
2010, 2011	Debt Collector Oharu	Oishi Kuranosuke	Meiji-za, Misono-za, Osaka Shochikuza	
2013	Atami Murder Case	Detective Chief Inspector Denbei Kimura	Minami-za	(Oyama Kintaro role only on July 19 and 20)
2014	It runs in the family – Don't call me Papa	Doctor David Mortimer	PARCO Theater	Leading role
2015	2015 New Year's Johnnys' World	Special Appearance	Imperial Theatre	
2016	Otafuku Story	Sadajiro	Meiji-za, Hakata-za	
2017	Lady's House	Tobe	Meiji-za	
2022	Salaryman Night Fever (Regional Tour)	President	Osaka Shochikuza	
2023	Salaryman Night Fever (Tokyo Tour)	Homeless people	Mitsukoshi Theater	
2023–2024	Fall Guy The final part: Ginjiro Passes Away	Doctor	Ikebukuro Theater Green Big Tree Theater	
2024	Ah, Friends From The Same Era	A superior officer, etc.	Mitsukoshi Theater, Minami-za	

=== Theater director, etc. ===
Year	Title	Notes	Theatre	Ref.
1995	Playzone '95 King & Joker	Writer/Director/Starring as Champ	Aoyama Theatre, Festival Hall, Osaka	
2009	Playzone 2009 Letter from the Sun	Writer/Director	Aoyama Theatre, Umeda Arts Theater	
2009	She Loves Me	Director	Theatre Creation	
2011	Kunio Yanagida and Kappa	Director	Fukusaki-cho Cultural Center, Hyogo	
2012	Teresa Teng's 60th Anniversary Koibito Tachi no Shinwa	Director	Mitsukoshi Theatre	
2012	Duet	Director	Theatre Creation, Umeda Arts Theater, Chunichi Theatre, Canal City Theater	
2013	The Odasaku	Director	Osaka Shochikuza, Shinbashi Enbujo	
2013	Atami Murder Case	Adapted, Director and Starring as Denbei Kimura	Sunshine Theater, Minami-za	
2014	Atami Murder Case; Qualifying Trial	Adapted and director	Nippon Broadcasting System, Imagine Studio	
2014	The Odasaku; Decadence of Love and Youth	Adapted and director	KAAT Kanagawa Arts Theatre, Minami-za	
2014	Departure	Adapted and director	Kabura Bunka Hall, Tomioka City, Gunma, Yamanashi Koranyi Bunka Hall, Fukushima City Public Hall, Shinbashi Enbujo	
2014	Yokohama Jam Town	Original idea and director	KAAT Kanagawa Arts Theatre	
2015	The Day They Dropped the Atomic Bomb on Hiroshima	Adapted and director	Theater 1010, Kitasenju, Minami-za, Hiroshima, Aster Plaza, Medium Hall, Kobe Bunka Hall, Medium Hall, Marinart Main Hall, Shizuoka, Kariya City Cultural Center, Aichi, Japan, Sunshine Theater	
2015	Ah, Friends From The Same Era	Adapted and director	Nippon Broadcasting System, Imagine Studio	
2015	Broken Love Compass	Director	Ginza Hakuhinkan Theater	
2015	A.B.C-Z Theatre 2015 Sons of the Mushroom	Director	Nissay Theatre	
2015	Jam Town the Live	Composition and director	Shibuya duo Music Exchange, Yokohama Thumbs Up	
2016	Jam Town – A New Musical	Original idea and director	KAAT Kanagawa Arts Theatre	
2016	Ah, Friends From The Same Era; Men in the sky who became winds	Adapted and director	Hakata Riverain Hall	
2016	Cuckolded Sousuke	Adapted and director	Osaka Shochikuza, Fukuoka Momochi Palace, Kariya City Cultural Center, Aichi, Japan, Shinbashi Enbujo	
2016	The Great Gatsby	Director	Sunshine Theater, Nagoya Arts Center, ROHM Theatre Kyoto South Hall, Shin-Kobe Oriental Theater	
2016	The Beginner's Revolutionary Lecture: Hiryuden	Director	Kitatopia Tsutsuji Hall	
2016	Ah, Friends From The Same Era; Men in the sky who became winds	Adapted and director	Kitatopia Tsutsuji Hall	
2016	A.B.C-Z 2016 Cheering Shop Co.!; Oh & Yeah!	Director	Nissay Theatre	
2016	Laughter on the 23rd Floor	Director	Kinokuniya Southern Theater Takashimaya, Hakuhinkan Theater, Artpia Hall, Youth Cultural Center, Kurume City Plaza The Grand Hall, Sankei Hall Breeze	
2017	Santa, Kawaraban Seller	Adapted and director	Nippon Broadcasting System, Imagine Studio	
2017	Cuckolded Sousuke	Director	Kitatopia Tsutsuji Hall	
2018	Ode to Joy	Director	Botchan Theater, Awagin Hall Tokushima Prefecture Local Culture Hall, Tokyo Performance at Tiara Koto Main Hall	
2018	Case Book of Naniwa	Director	Osaka Shochikuza, Shinbashi Enbujo	
2018	The Second Generation is Christian	Supervisor	Kitatopia Tsutsuji Hall	
2018	Grief7	Director	Haiyuza Theater	
2019	Setouchi Koshinkyoku	Director	Botchan Theater	
2019	Grief7 Sin#2	Adapted and director	Kinokuniya Hall	
2020	Salaryman Night Fever	Writer/director	Honjo Matsuzakatei Theater	
2020	The Legend of Momotaro: A Demon's Requiem	Director	Botchan Theater	
2020	Atami Murder Case; The Longest Spring	Script cooperation	Otsuka Man Theatre	
2020	Poison and the Old Lady	Director	(Performances canceled)	(Note: Performances canceled due to COVID-19)
2021	Shining Monster; Baku no Fuda [Shining version/Shadow version]	Director	CBGK Shibugeki!	
2021	Salaryman Night Fever	Writer/Director	Honjo Matsuzakatei Theater	
2022	Frankenstein; cry for the moon	Director	Kinokuniya Southern Theater Takashimaya, Cool Japan Park Osaka TT Hall	
2022	The Legend of Momotaro Okayama: Demon's Requiem 2	Director	Tennozu Ginga Theater	
2022	Poison and the Old Lady	Director	Shinbashi Enbujo, Misono-za, Kurume City Plaza The Grand Hall, Sapporo Doshin Hall, Osaka Shochikuza	
2022	Hiryuden 2022; Love and Youth in front of the Diet	Director	Kinokuniya Hall	
2022	Teihon: Atami Murder Case	Supervisor	Nakano Pocket Square Theatre Bonbon, Kobe Sannomiya Theater Eto, Nakano Pocket Square Theatre Momo	
2022	Shining Monster 2nd step -Tengen-tsu-	Director	Asakusa Hana Theater	
2022	Salaryman Night Fever	Writer/director/performer as President	Sendai Denryoku Hall, Tokai Art Theater, Kanazawa Opera House, Toda City Cultural Hall, Fukuoka Suito Yanagawa Hakushu Hall, Osaka Shochikuza	
2023	Salaryman Night Fever	Writer, director, and performed as a homeless man	Mitsukoshi Theatre	
2023	Kano from 1931 2000 kilometers to Koshien Stadium	Director	Botchan Theatre	
2023	The Witch of the Hedge	Director	Osaka Shochikuza, Regional Tour (Yamaguchi, Fukuoka, Kumamoto, Shizuoka)	
2023	Fall Guy The final part: Ginjiro Passes Away	Director and Performance as Doctor	Ikebukuro Theater Green Big Tree Theater	
2024	Ah, Friends From The Same Era	Director, Adapted, Performed	Mitsukoshi Theater, Minami-za	
2024	Atami Murder Case	Director	Shinsaibashi Kado-za	
2024	Fall Guy The final part: Ginjiro Passes Away	Director and Performance as Doctor	Asakusa Hana Theater	
2024	Carmen Returns Home	Director	Shinbashi Enbujō, Osaka Shochikuza, Sendai Denryoku Hall, Misono-za, Kagoshima Hozan Hall, Kumamoto Civic Center Sears Home Dream Hall	

== Discography ==
=== Single ===
Release date	Title	Format	Label	Notes
July 21, 1994	Legend of the Dawn	CD	Pony Canyon	Theme song for Fatal Fury: The Motion Picture
October 29, 2021	Cafe Uncle Cinnamon	CD (maxi single)	Uncle Cinnamon / Gotown Records	
October 29, 2021	Song for you	7inch EP	Uncle Cinnamon / Gotown Records	
May 20, 2022	Stone of Glory (Will)	Digital download	Uncle Cinnamon Records	Theme song for the stage play Hiryuden 2022 Love and Youth in Front of the Diet
June 1, 2022	Stone of Glory (Will)	Streaming only	Uncle Cinnamon Records	Theme song for the stage play Hiryuden 2022 Love and Youth in Front of the Diet

=== Album ===
Release date	Title	Format	Label	Notes
April 26, 2023	Kayo Style Collection	CD	Uncle Cinnamon Records	Showa era pop song cover album

== Concert ==
- Kazukiyo Nishikiori dinner show (2000 Tokyo, Osaka)

=== With Katsuhide Uekusa ===
- Kazukiyo Nishikiori and Katsuhide Uekusa presents their show & time "Song for you" (2022 Tokyo, Osaka)

=== As Funky Diamond 18 ===
- Funky Diamond 18 Live Tour 2023 "Primemax" (2023 Nagoya, Osaka, Tokyo, Fukuoka)

== Books ==
- Kazukiyo Nishikiori's Directing Theory (2022, Nikkei BP) ISBN 978-4-296-20139-6
- Boy's Time Capsule (2023, Shinchosha) ISBN 978-4-103-54931-4
  - First autobiography
