= Shonentai =

Former Japanese boy band

Shonentai 少年隊
- From left to right: Nishikiori, Higashiyama, Uekusa.

Background information
- Origin: Japan
- Genre: J-pop
- Years active: 1985–2020
- Labels: Warner Music Japan; Pony Canyon; Johnny's Entertainment; Elov-label
- Past members: Noriyuki Higashiyama; Kazukiyo Nishikiori; Katsuhide Uekusa

Shonentai (少年隊, Shōnentai; lit. "Regiment of Boys") was a three-member Japanese boy band created by entertainment company Johnny & Associates, now rebranded to Starto Entertainment. They debuted on December 12, 1985. They were one of Japan's leading Japanese idol groups of the 1980s. The group led the annual musical Playzone from 1986 to 2008 for about 957 performances with a total attendance of over 1.38 million people over the course of 22 years.

On September 20, 2020, it was announced that Nishikiori and Uekusa would leave Johnny & Associates by the end of the year. The group name will be retained in accordance with the members' desire to preserve their past achievements and Shonentai itself, but there are no plans for future activities, and the group has effectively been placed on hiatus.

In September 2023, amid renewed controversy surrounding the Johnny Kitagawa sexual abuse scandal, Higashiyama became president and CEO of Johnny & Associates and retired from entertainment activities at the end of the same year, but there is currently no mention of the continuation of the name as a group after Higashiyama's retirement, so it is unclear. (Note: As of July 2024, Nishikori and Uekusa are listed as official members on their Oricon profiles, while the retired Higashiyama is treated as a former member.)

== Members ==
- Noriyuki Higashiyama (東山紀之, Higashiyama Noriyuki; born September 30, 1966) His nickname is Higashi. Currently president of Smile-Up.
- Kazukiyo Nishikiori (錦織一清, Nishikiori Kazukiyo; born May 22, 1965) His nickname is Nicky. The leader.
- Katsuhide Uekusa (植草克秀, Uekusa Katsuhide; born July 24, 1966) His nickname is Kacchan.

== History ==
=== 1981: Formation ===
Shonentai was formed in 1981 by Nishikiori, Uekusa, and Yasuyuki Matsubara under the name "B Team." In 1982, Higashiyama joined the group in place of Matsubara and became Shonentai, working as a backup dancer for Toshihiko Tahara and Masahiko Kondō. The name Shonentai (boys troop in Japanese) was originally used to refer to all the trainees before their debut, of which there were about 20 to 30 in the company at that time, and was called "Johnny's Shonentai". From that name, "Johnny's" was taken off and used directly as the name of the group. Initially, the group was considered to debut in the U.S., but since the pronunciation of Shonentai is similar to Showtime, the plan was to debut with the name as it is.

It is said that Nishikiori was born with a natural talent for dancing, and after seeing a dance he performed at an audition when he was in the sixth grade, Kitagawa described him as a genius. Masahiro Nakai, who was his junior and a member of SMAP, also said that Nishikiori's dancing ability was outstanding and that he had never seen anyone surpass him later in life. Higashiyama was a stoic, hardworking person who watched Michael Jackson music videos after school in his dormitory and worked on his muscle training every day. Nishikiori said that although he and Higashiyama had different types of dancing, they hit it off because they felt the same way about sound. Uekusa was a little less of a dancer than the two of them, but he was a character who worked hard to keep up with them.

They appeared on music programs such as Yoru no Hit Studio (Fuji Television) even before their record debut, won a gold medal and a choreography award at Music Festival of Hawaii in November 1982, and in 1983, two TV series After School with a Sizzling Heart (Fuji Television) starring the three of them were aired, and in 1984 In April, they held their first solo concert in Tokyo. They would see and learn from musicals on Broadway theatres and even take dance lessons in the U.S. They were also prepared to make their U.S. debut and recorded an English-language song produced by Michael Sembello, but it did not come to fruition because they became busy with work in Japan. (Note: The first Johnny's to debut in the U.S. in later years was the junior group Travis Japan in 2022.)

On New Year's Eve 1984, Nishikiori made a direct appeal to Mary Yasuko Fujishima, Kitagawa's elder sister, who was involved in the management of Johnny's, at a company year-end party, to let them make their debut, even if it was on a flexi disc. Six months later, they were told by Mary that their debut was decided. For their debut, they were strictly taught greetings, courtesy, and other common sense by Mary.

=== 1985: Record Debut ===
After a period of trainees, they made their record debut with Kamen Butōkai on December 12, 1985. Their catchphrase at the time of their debut (Japanese idols in Shōwa era had their own catchphrase) was “From Japan to the World." Three types of jacket photos for the record Kamen Butōkai were released, each with Higashiyama, Nishikiori, and Uekusa in the center, contributing to increased sales of the record. The following year, they won Japan Record Award for Best New Artist in 1986, and the happening that Yūzō Kayama, captain of the white team, introduced them as Kamen Rider at the 37th Kōhaku Uta Gassen is well known. They made their first appearance NHK Kōhaku Uta Gassen in 1986, a national singing show at the end of the year, and participated for the next eight consecutive years.

At the time of their debut, all three could do backflips and back somersault, and their advanced acrobatic skills, such as throwing and catching microphones, were much talked about. At that time, youth was the main selling point for Japanese idols, and singing and dancing skills were not often required, but Shonentai was said to be outstanding in the quality of its singing, dancing, and acrobatics. After their debut, they went to New York City and spent a week with Michael Peters, who choreographed their songs. Their third single, Diamond Eyes, is known for being choreographed by Peters.

Following their debut song, they released hit songs such as Dekamelon Densetsu, Diamond Eyes, Ballad no youni Nemure, Stripe Blue, Kimidakeni, ABC, Jirettaine, and Maittane Konya, which reached the high ranks on the weekly Oricon charts. In TV singing shows of the time, singers usually sang in front of musicians prepared by the TV station, but since Japan was in Japanese asset price bubble at the time, Shonentai sometimes went all the way to the U.S. to sing live on air in Las Vegas or in front of used car dealerships with many American cars.

In 1988, the term "soy sauce face," (soft facial features) coined to describe a Japanese-looking, fair-skinned, cool-looking man like Higashiyama's, and the term "sauce face," (defined facial features) coined to describe a tanned, chiseled face like Nishikiori's, became popular among young women to describe good-looking men. They were selected for the "Basic Knowledge of Modern Terms" published every December It won the Popular Award in the Popular Words category of the 1988 U-CAN Inc.

Their on-stage banter also entertained the audiences. Trend critic Megumi Ushikubo said that the three characters were perfectly balanced: Higashiyama was quiet and stoic like a prince, Uekusa was a funny man, a beloved character with a bit of a goofy side and Nishikiori, one year older than the two, was the leader a straight man and dexterous. Gradually, Nishikiori began to give funny talks, often cracking jokes, and was even called the "comedy guy" of them.

The musical Playzone starring them began in 1986, the year after their debut, and ran for 30 to 50 performances each summer, by the summer of 2008, it had run for about 957 performances with a total attendance of over 1.38 million people over the course of 22 years. In preparing Playzone, they also received guidance from Michael Peters and Travis Payne to create a quality musical. They were handed over to junior group Kis-My-Ft2 in 2009, and from then until the closing of the Aoyama Theatre in 2015, the junior group continued to play the lead role in the show every year. Nishikiori also began directing stage productions in 1995, and since then he has also worked as a stage director.

As for their individual activities, as an actor, Higashiyama performed a wide range of roles, from jidaigeki, detective stories to comedies. Nishikiori worked mainly on stage, not only as an actor but also as a stage director, drawing on his experience at Playzone. and Uekusa also worked primarily as an actor, playing familiar roles in the popular domestic drama series Wataru Seken wa Oni Bakari and the popular detective TV series Hagure Keiji Junjoha.

=== 2020: Departure of Nishikiori and Uekusa and indefinite hiatus ===
In September 2020, Nishikiori and Uekusa announced that they would be leaving Johnny's by the end of the year. Despite the fact that the two are leaving the company, it was an unusual announcement that Shonentai would not disband and will continue to live on under this name, but their future activities are undecided. Johnny's official website stated, "Shonentai, as an analogy, is a group that has steadily accumulated enough achievements over the past 35 years to deserve to be inducted into the Hall of Fame. Although we have no plans to be active as a group in the future, we have decided to create an environment in which we can continue to be a beacon for our junior members at the Johnny's without any change, We thank them both for their past accomplishments and send them on their new journeys." It also made it clear that their departure from the company was amicable. On December 12, their 35th anniversary of their debut, the best album Shonentai 35th Anniversary Best and a DVD box set summarizing the history of the stage Playzone were released.

At the time of their departure, since the end of Playzone, which was their stage show series, there has been little activity as a group Shonentai, each of the three members was mainly engaged in their own individual activities. Nishikiori and Uekusa said that their decision to leave at the same time was not based on any particular discussion between them, but rather on the fact that Kitagawa, a father figure who taught them many things about show business, died in July 2019, which led them to think about their future and come to this decision at the same time. Nishikiori explained the reason, "After Kitagawa passed away, there was farewell ceremony for concerned persons only, attended by all of Johnny's talents. What I felt there was that Johnny's was no longer the small company we belonged to when we were young, but had become a very large company. It was as if I had become a crew member of a large ship, and when I wondered if there would be room for me on this ship in the future, I thought there would not be, which is why I decided to leave." Uekusa said that the reason why he left Johnny's was because "as we get older, our way of thinking changes, and we decided to do what each of us wants to do independently," and he described relationship with Higashiyama and Nishikiori as fatal bond, and explained he would continue to talk to both of them about anything, and would remain open.

=== 2023: Higashiyama retired from public stage ===
Higashiyama retired from public stage at the end of the same year after succeeding as president of Johnny's in September, but a month later, the company had split up into two companies; Smile-Up and Starto Entertainment, and shut down its operations, with Higashiyama retaining his role in Smile-Up. There has also been no official announcement regarding the continuation of the name of Shonentai after Higashiyama's retirement, so it is unclear. In February 2024, Uekusa was asked in an interview about the possibility of reviving Shonentai, and he said that they never said they would break up in the first place, and that although it is not so easy now, there may be a possibility of their resuming their activities if the time eventually comes when the three of them can resume their group activities in a way that makes sense to them. Uekusa also said that while he understands Higashiyama's decision to retire, his own feelings are that he would like to see him return to show business someday.

== Awards ==
- 28th Japan Record Award for Best New Artist, "Kamen Butōkai" (1986)
- 19th Japan Cable Awards, Newcomer of the Year "Kamen Butōkai" (1986)
- 24th Golden Arrow Award, Best Newcomer Award (1986)
- 31st Golden Arrow Award, Grand Prize, Theater Prize (1993)

== Appearances ==
TV Dramas

- Monday Drama Land Munasawagi no Houkago (October 24, 1983; Fuji TV)
- Monday Drama Land Munasawagi no Houkago Part II (December 19, 1983; Fuji TV)
- Monday Drama Land Shonentai no Tadaima Houkago Special (June 4, 1984; Fuji TV)
- Monday Drama Land Show up ★ High School (March 4, 1985; Fuji TV)
- Yan Yan Utau Studio~5 Minute Drama Norainu Densetsu PART 1 (TV Tokyo)
- Yan Yan Utau Studio~5 Minute Drama Norainu Densetsu PART 2 (TV Tokyo)
- Kokoro wa Lonely Kimochi wa "..." V (March 1987; Fuji TV)
- Wataru Seken wa Oni Bakari Series (TBS) - Only Nishikiori and Uekusa, Higashiyama made a guest appearance
- Shonen Taiya~ Select Stage Atami Satsujin Jiken (October - November, 2001; Fuji TV)
- Shonen Taiya~ Select Stage Shibushi (November - December, 2001; Fuji TV) - Only Higashiyama and Uekusa

TV Shows

- The Young Best Ten (October 6, 1981 – 1982; TV Tokyo)
- Let's GO Idol (1982; TV Tokyo)
- Pinky Punch Daigyakuten (April - September, 1982; TBS)
- Parinko Gakuen No.1 (September 1982 - March 1983; TBS)
- The Hit Stage (April 1983 - March 1984; TBS)
- Namada! Omoshiro Tokkyubin (April - September, 1984; TBS)
- Sekai Marumie! TV Tokusoubu (April 1998–present; NTV) - Only Higashiyama and Uekusa
- Shonentime (October 1999 - March 2000; Fuji TV)
- Shonentime II (April 2000 - September 2000; Fuji TV)
- Shonentime III (October 2000 - March 2001; Fuji TV)
- Shonentaiya (April 2001 - December 2001; Fuji TV)

Film

- Munasawagi no Houkago (1982)
- Love Forever (1983)
- Aitsu to Lullaby (1983)
- 19 Nineteen (1987)

Radio

- Jumping Johnny's Shonentai
- Live On! Johnny's Shonentai
- Live On! Shonentai
- Dakishimete! Shonentai
- Shukan Shonentai Magazine

Musical

- Musical Adventure The Sasuke/Hit Parade (April - May 1985)
- ShowGeki '92 MASK (May 1992)
- PLAYZONE MYSTERY (July 5–27, 1986; 30 performances)
- PLAYZONE '87 TIME-19 (July 3–26, 1987; 30 performances)
- PLAYZONE '88 Capriccio -Tenshi to Akuma no Kisokyoku- (July 4 - August 31, 1988; 51 performances)
- PLAYZONE '89 Again (July - August, 1989; 53 performances)
- PLAYZONE '90 MASK (July 7 - August 19, 1990; 42 performances)
- PLAYZONE '91 SHOCK (July - August, 1991; 41 performances)
- PLAYZONE '92 Saraba Diary (July 11 - August 16, 1992; 39 performances)
- PLAYZONE '93 WINDOW (July 8 - August 19, 1993; 41 performances)
- PLAYZONE '94 MOON (July 5 - August 12, 1994; 45 performances)
- PLAYZONE '95 KING&JOKER (July 7 - August 13, 1995; 40 performances)
- PLAYZONE '96 RYTHM (July - August, 1996; 38 performances)
- PLAYZONE '97 RYTHM II (July 12 - August 11, 1997; 35 performances)
- PLAYZONE '98 5nights (July 12 - August 17, 1998; 40 performances)
- PLAYZONE 1999 Goodbye&Hello (July 11 - August 15, 1999; 41 performances)
- PLAYZONE 2000 THEME PARK (July 16 - August 20, 2000; 40 performances)
- PLAYZONE 2001 EMOTION ~Shinseiki~ (July 14 - August 17, 2001; 44 performances)
- PLAYZONE 2002 Aishi (July 13 - August 15, 2002; 42 performances)
- PLAYZONE 2003 Vacation (July 14 - August 17, 2003; 40 performances)
- PLAYZONE 2004 WEST SIDE STORY (July 2 - August 16, 2004; 51 performances)
- PLAYZONE 2005 ~20th Anniversary~ Twenty Years...Soshite Mada Minu Miraie (July 6 - August 17, 2005; 44 performances)
- PLAYZONE 2006 Change (July 9 - August 5, 2006; 40 performances)
- PLAYZONE 2007 Change2Chance (July 7 - September 7, 2007; 40 performances)
- PLAYZONE 2008 Change 1986-2008 ~SHOW TIME Hit Series~ (July 6 - August 31, 2008; 45 performances)

== Discography ==
Singles

1. "Kamen Butokai" (Released: December 12, 1985)
2. "Dekamelon Densetsu" (Released: March 24, 1986)
3. "Diamond・Eyes" (Released: July 7, 1986)
4. "Ballad no youni Nemure" (Released: November 28, 1986)
5. "Stripe Blue" (Released: March 3, 1987)
6. "Kimidakeni" (Released: June 24, 1987)
7. "ABC" (Released: November 11, 1987)
8. "Lady" (Released: November 30, 1987)
9. "Futari" (Released: March 23, 1988)
10. "Silent Dancer" (Released: April 24, 1988)
11. "What's Your Name?" (Released: July 8, 1988)
12. "Jirettaine" (Released: November 10, 1988)
13. "Maittane Konya" (Released: June 19, 1989)
14. "Fuin Love" (Released: April 10, 1990)
15. "Funky Flushin'" (Released: July 7, 1990)
16. "Suna no Otoko" (Released: December 12, 1990)
17. "You're My Life -Utsukushi Hitoe-" (Released: April 29, 1993)
18. "Window" (Released: July 1993)
19. "Excuse" (Released: November 19, 1993)
20. "Oh!!" (Released: December 1, 1995)
21. "Wangan Skier" (Released: January 28, 1998)
22. "Ai to Chinmoku" (Released: August 26, 1998)
23. "Jōnetsu no Ichiya" (Released: June 23, 1999)
24. "Romantic Time" (Released: February 2, 2000)
25. "Kimi ga ita Koro" (Released: February 21, 2001)
26. "So Soh" (Released: July 9, 2006)

Albums

1. Backstage Pass (Released: March 8, 1986)
2. Sho Shonentai (Released: September 1, 1986)
3. Musical Plazon Mistery (Released: October 30, 1986)
4. Duet (Released: November 28, 1986)
5. Wonderland (Released: December 21, 1986)
6. Private Life: Light & Shadow (Released: April 28, 1987)
7. Time 19 (Released: July 1, 1987)
8. Magical Dowa Tour (Released: September 25, 1987)
9. Musical Time 19 (Released: October 28, 1987)
10. Party (Released: December 14, 1987)
11. Best of Shonentai (Released: March 10, 1988)
12. Capriccio: Tenshi to Akuma no Kasōkyoku (Released: June 10, 1988)
13. Shonentai Musical Playzone '89 Again (Released: September 21, 1989)
14. Shonentai Musical Playzone '90 Mask (Released: June 30, 1990)
15. Heart to Heart 5years Shonentai... Soshite 1991 (Released: December 23, 1990)
16. Ai wa Tsudukeru Koto ni Imi ga Aru (Released: December 1, 1993)
17. Shonentai Musical Playzone'94 Moon (Released: June 17, 1994)
18. Shonentai Musical Playzone'96 Rhythm (Released: July 10, 1996)
19. Shonentai Musical Playzone'97 Rhythm 2 (Released: July 21, 1997)
20. Shonentai Musical Playzone'98 5nights (Released: August 5, 1998)
21. Prism (Released: January 27, 1999)
22. Shonentai Musical Playzone'99 Good bye & Hello (Released: July 7, 1999)
23. Shonentai Musical Playzone2000 Theme Park (Released: August 2, 2000)
24. Shonentai Musical Playzone2001 Shinseiki Emotion (Released: August 1, 2001)
25. Shonentai Musical Playzone2002 Ai Shi (Released: July 31, 2002)
26. Shonentai Musical Playzone2003 Vacation (Released: August 6, 2003)
27. Shonentai Musical Playzone2005 20th Anniversary: Twenty Years… Soshite Mada Minu Mirai e (Released: August 10, 2005)
28. Shonentai Musical Playzone2006 Change (Released: July 26, 2006)
29. Shonentai Musical Playzone2007 Change 2 Chance: First Act (Released: September 5, 2007)
30. Shonentai 35th Anniversary Best (Released: December 12, 2020)

== See also ==
- Playzone - Shonentai starring in Johnny & Associates annual musical from 1986 to 2008

== Notes ==
Preceded by Miho Nakayama	Japan Record Award for Best New Artist; 1986	Succeeded by Risa Tachibana
Preceded by Minako Honda	FNS Music Festival for Best New Artist; 1986	Succeeded by BaBe
