= Shonentai 35th Anniversary Best =

2020 album by Shonentai

Greatest hits album by Shonentai
- Released: 12 December 2020
- Recorded: 1985–2020
- Genre: J-Pop
- Length: Disc 1 - 58:55; Disc 2 - 60:19; Disc 3 - 61:07
- Label: ELOV-Label
- Producers: Julie Keiko Fujishima (Executive producer); Johnny Kitagawa (Eternal producer)

Shonentai chronology
Prism (1999)	Shonentai 35th Anniversary Best (2020)

Shonentai 35th Anniversary Best is the second compilation album by Japanese idol group Shonentai. It was released on 12 December 2020, the day of their 35th anniversary, under ELOV-Label. The album release was announced on the same day as an announcement from the withdrawal from group and agency of two members – Nishikiori and Uekusa, as there are no future plans for the group.

== Background ==
It is their first album release since 1999's studio album Prism and their first compilation album in 32 years. In November 2020, they've changed their visual profile image on their official website page for the first time in 12 years.

The compilation album was released in two types: a regular edition and a limited edition, available only for the fanclub members. Both of the editions share the same track list on the Disc 1 and Disc 2.

Regular edition of the album includes 3 CDs of the biggest hits from their career such as Kamen Budokai, Kimi Dake ni and several picks up from B-Side and albums, with a total of 39 tracks.

The limited edition includes a total of 12 discs – the first half of them includes CD discs and the second half includes DVD discs. Discs from number 3–5 includes renewed versions of their old hits, previously unreleased tapes and musical records from the musical stages. Discs from number 6 to 12 includes live tour and music video clip collection digitalised into the DVD format, for the first time since its VHS original release.

== Charting ==
The album reached number 1 on Oricon Daily Albums Chart in the first week with 12,000 copies sold, and reached number 4 on Oricon Weekly Albums Chart with total 18,480 copies sold.

== Track listing ==
=== Disc 1 ===
No.	Title	Lyrics	Music	Arrangers	Length
1.	"Kamen Butokai" (仮面舞踏会, debut single)	Tetsuya Chiaki	Kyōhei Tsutsumi	Motoki Funeyama	3:46
2.	"Decameron Densetsu" (デカメロン伝説, 2nd single)	Yasushi Akimoto	Tsutsumi	Hiroshi Shinkawa	3:31
3.	"Diamond Eyes" (ダイヤモンド・アイズ, 3rd single)	Emi Kanda	Hiro Nagasawa	Osamu Totsuka	4:18
4.	"Ballad no Youni Nemure" (バラードのように眠れ, 4th single)	Takashi Matsumoto	Tsutsumi	Kōji Makaino	4:36
5.	"Stripe Blue" (5th single)	Matsumoto	Tsutsumi	Makaino	3:59
6.	"Kimi Dake ni" (君だけに, 6th single)	Chinfa Kan	Tsutsumi	Makaino	3:49
7.	"ABC" (7th single)	Matsumoto	Tsutsumi	Funeyama	4:38
8.	"LADY" (8th single)	Masumi Kawamura	Katsuhisa Hattori	Hattori	4:28
9.	"Silent Dancer" (9th single)	Masao Urino	Tsunehiro Izumi	Izumi	5:22
10.	"Futari" (ふたり, 10th single)	Aska	Aska	Tatsunari Yakabe (strings arrangement: Hattori)	4:41
11.	"What's your name" (11th single)	Tomo Miyashita	Jimmy Johnson	Johnson	4:39
12.	"Jirettaine" (じれったいね, 12th single)	Hiromi Mori	Tsutsumi	Shinkawa	4:33
13.	"Maittane Konya" (まいったネ今夜, 13th single)	Miyashita	Miyashita	Katsunori Ishida	4:34

=== Disc 2 ===
No.	Title	Lyrics	Music	Arrangers	Length
1.	"Fuuin Love" (封印LOVE, 15th single)	Yoshiko Miura	Yōsuke Sugiyama	Sugiyama	3:46
2.	"Funky Flushin" (16th single, Tatsuro Yamashita's cover)	Minako Yoshida	Tatsuro Yamashita	Funeyama	3:31
3.	"Suna no Otoko" (砂の男, 17th single)	Anju Mana	Hitoshi Haba	Funeyama	4:18
4.	"You're My Life: Utsukushii Kimi he" (You're My Life-美しい人へ-, 18th single)	Reiji Matsumoto	Yuusuke Fuguchi		4:36
5.	"Excuse" (19th single)	Neko Oikawa	Yoshimasa Inoue		3:59
6.	"Oh!!" (20th single)	Gorō Matsui	Ryo Fujio	Norimasa Yamanaka	3:49
7.	"Wangan Skier" (湾岸スキーヤー, 21st single, originally performed by Yamashita for CM in 1993 (never released full version))	Akimoto	Yamashita, Alan O'Day	Akira Inoue	4:38
8.	"Ai to Chinmoku" (愛と沈黙, 22nd single)	Kan	Keizo Nakanishi, Takao Konishi	Konishi	4:28
9.	"Jounetsu no Ichiya" (情熱の一夜, 23rd single)	Matsui	Makaino	Makaino	5:22
10.	"Romantic Time" (ロマンチックタイム, 24th single)	Hiroshi Furuyama	Tetsuji Hayashi	Funeyama	4:41
11.	"Kimi ga Ita koro" (君がいた頃, 25th single)	Platina	Makaino	Makaino	4:39
12.	"Sou SOH" (想 SOH, final single)	Takamitsu Shimazaki	Thomas Thornholm, Michael Clauss, Dan Attlerud	Takashi Masuda	4:33

=== Disc 3 ===
No.	Title	Lyrics	Music	Arrangers	Length
1.	"Anata ni Ima Good-bye" (あなたに今Good-bye, from first videoclip "Shonentai", previously unreleased music recording)	Miyashita	Ichiro Nitta	Nitta, Makaino	3:46
2.	"Aitsu to Lullaby" (あいつとララバイ, from first videoclip "Shonentai", previously unreleased music recording)	Miyashita	Miyashita	Katsunori Ishida	3:31
3.	"Twilight Feeling" (トワイライト・フィーリング, from first videoclip "Shonentai", previously unreleased music recording)	SHOW	Ken Satou	Ishida	4:18
4.	"Kanji dane...Dela" (感じだね......デラ, previously unreleased music recording)	Kazuko Kobayashi	Makoto Matsushita	Matsushita	4:36
5.	"Harukaze ni iine!" (春風にイイネ!, B-Side of debut single (type-b))	Miyashita	Satou	Satoshi Nakamura	3:59
6.	"One Step Beyond" (B-side of debut single (type-c))	Alan O'Day	S.A.Williams	Funeyama	3:49
7.	"Rainy Express" (レイニー・エクスプレス, B-side of 3rd single)	Miyashita	Miyashita	Mark Goldenberg	4:38
8.	"Success Street" (サクセス・ストリート, from debut album "Sho Shonentai")	Chiaki	Tsutsumi	Funeyama	4:28
9.	"Hoshikuzu no Spangle" (星屑のスパンコール, from debut album "Sho Shonentai")	Yoshihiko Ando	Izumi	Osamu Totsuka	5:22
10.	"Ugi Ugi Cat!" (ヴギウギ・キャット!, from EP "Wonderland")	Kazumi Yasui	Kazuhiko Katou	Hiroshi Shinkawa	4:41
11.	"First Memory" (from soundtrack album "PRIVATE LIFE -Light & Shadow-")	Ikki Matsumoto	Hattori	Hattori	4:39
12.	"Ai no Tegami" (愛の手紙, B-side of 12th single)	Mori	Tsutsumi	Funeyama	4:33
13.	"PGF" (B-side of 20th single, PGF stands for positive girlfriend)	Oikawa	Yoshimasa Inoue	Yasunori Iwasaki	4:33
14.	"The longest night" (from the final studio album "Prism")	Yoko Nezu	Hiroshi Sakamoto	Masayuki Iwata	4:33

== Usage in media ==
- Kanji dane...Dela was promoted as a commercial song for Meiji Cholocate brand DELA
- Stripe Blue was promoted as a theme song to the fashion building "Harajuku Idol Wonderland" during its first open
- Kimi Dake Ni was promoted as a theme song to the movie Nineteen, starred by all three members themselves
- LADY was broadcast as an anime television series Lady!!
- Silent Dancer was promoted as a commercial song to the watch brand Seiko
- Oh! was broadcast as theme song to the television series The Chef, starred by Higashiyama himself
- Wangan Skier was broadcast as an image song to the 1998 Winter Olympics on Fuji TV
- Ai to Chinmoku was broadcast as a theme song to the television drama series Harmonia Kono Ai no Hate
