= Nineteen (1987 film) =

- DVD cover
- Directed by: Kensho Yamashita
- Written by: Chinka Yo
- Produced by: Hitoshi Ogura
- Starring: Noriyuki Higashiyama; Kazukyo Nishikiori; Katsuhide Uekusa
- Cinematography: Masahiro Kishimoto
- Edited by: Yoshiyuki Okuhara
- Music by: Yajin
- Production company: Johnnys
- Distributed by: Toho
- Release date: August 1, 1987 (Japan)
- Running time: 98 minutes
- Country: Japan
- Language: Japanese

Nineteen (Japanese: ナインテイーン, Hepburn: Nainteīn) or Naintiin is a 1987 Japanese science fiction film directed by Kensho Yamashita. It was produced by Toho Company, Limited. This is a teen idol film.
