= Noriyuki Higashiyama =

Japanese businessman and former singer (born 1966)

- 東山 紀之
- Born: September 30, 1966 (age 60); Kawasaki, Kanagawa, Japan
- Occupation: Businessman
- Agent(s): Smile-Up (2023–present); Johnny & Associates (1979–2023)
- Spouse: Yoshino Kimura (m. 2010)
- Children: 2
- Musical career
- Also known as: Higashiyama-san, Higashi
- Genre: J-pop
- Occupations: Singer, actor
- Years active: 1979–2023
- Label: Elov-label
- Formerly of: Shonentai
- Website: Shonentai (Elov-label)

Noriyuki Higashiyama (東山 紀之, Higashiyama Noriyuki; born September 30, 1966 in Kawasaki, Kanagawa, Japan) is a Japanese businessman, former singer, actor, and member of the idol group Shonentai. He is married to actress Yoshino Kimura.

In September 2023, Higashiyama became president of Johnny & Associates, later renamed Smile-Up, following the sexual abuse scandal involving its late founder, Johnny Kitagawa. He retired from the entertainment industry at the end of that year. He served as president until September 2026.

== History ==
=== Childhood (1966–1979) ===
According to his book Kawasaki Kid, Higashiyama's paternal great-grandfather was Russian. When he was still a baby, his grandfather drunkenly poured boiling water on his leg, which left him with a deformity in his left foot. Because of this burn, he stated that his leg remained bandaged until he was about three years old. Higashiyama was known to train very hard, doing 1,000 sit-ups daily, running 100 kilometres (62 mi) and maintaining a body fat percentage of 9%. He worked out intensely because the deformity in his leg caused pain in his hip joint without muscle training. Despite his leg deformities, he was athletic and could do a backflip at the age of nine.

His parents divorced when he was three years old due to his father's drinking problem. Worried that Higashiyama would become a drunkard like his father and grandfather, his mother repeatedly advised him, "When you grow up, be careful that alcohol doesn't ruin your life." He credited this guidance with helping him avoid getting deeply intoxicated when he did drink. His mother later remarried when he was in the fourth grade, but his stepfather gradually began to drink and became violent, not only towards his mother and Higashiyama but also towards his sister. He spent his days hungry due to poverty and frightened by his stepfather's violence. He and his younger sister were raised by their mother, who worked at a barber shop. They lived in poverty and sometimes struggled to find food, but a Korean family who ran a barbecue restaurant in the neighborhood would share their meals with them, helping them stave off hunger. (Note: Higashiyama says he dislikes ethnic discrimination because of his own Russian heritage and because of the help he received from Korean family in the neighborhood.)

=== Early career (1979–1985) ===
In 1979, his mother, who worked at a barbershop for NHK employees in Shibuya, Tokyo, gave him tickets to watch a singing show. Higashiyama went with a friend to see the show at NHK. On their way home, while waiting at a traffic light at Shibuya Crossing, he caught the eye of Johnny Kitagawa, who was driving by and scouted him directly. He was in the sixth grade at the time.

Higashiyama, who had always suffered from hunger, stated that after he joined Johnny's, he was grateful that Johnny Kitagawa would take him out to eat after dance lessons. When he entered high school, he left home to escape his stepfather and began living in Johnny's dormitory. Higashiyama mentioned that for a while after he joined Johnny's, he struggled to dance well because he found it strange for a man to sing and dance as an idol at that time. However, he was "struck by lightning" when he saw a Michael Jackson video in the dormitory, and he honed his dancing skills in admiration of him. In the dormitory, he also practiced acrobatics with the other trainees who lived there.

In 1981, the "B Team" was formed with Kazukiyo Nishikiori, Katsuhide Uekusa, and Yasuyuki Matsubara. The following year, in 1982, Matsubara was replaced by Higashiyama, and the group was renamed Shonentai. They primarily worked as backup dancers for Toshihiko Tahara and Masahiko Kondō.

=== Acting career (1985–2023) ===
Shonentai made their record debut on December 12, 1985, with the single Kamen Butōkai. At the time of their debut, all three members could perform backflips and back somersaults, and their advanced acrobatic skills, such as throwing and catching microphones, garnered significant attention. Higashiyama portrayed a prince-like character who was calm and spoke little.

After his debut, in addition to his group activities, he primarily worked as an actor in TV dramas, movies, and stage performances.

In 1988, Shonentai became popular among young women, leading to the coining of the term "soy sauce face" (soft facial features) to describe a Japanese-looking, fair-skinned, cool-looking man like Higashiyama. The term "sauce face" (defined facial features) was coined to describe a tanned, chiseled face like Nishikiori's, becoming popular to characterize good-looking men. They were selected for the "Basic Knowledge of Modern Terms," published every December, and won the Popular Award in the Popular Words category of the 1988 U-CAN Inc.

With his stoic image, he has leveraged his acting career to portray a wide range of roles, from prince-like characters and jidaigeki (historical dramas) to comedies. After portraying Japanese historical figures such as Okita Sōji, Minamoto no Yoshitsune, and Hikaru Genji, he became the first Johnny's actor to star in an NHK Taiga drama in 1993 with Ryukyu no Kaze. He has starred in the popular TV Asahi jidaigeki drama Hissatsu series since 2007, the NHK jidaigeki drama Ooka Echizen since 2013, and the TV Asahi serial detective drama Seven Detectives since 2015.

On September 20, 2020, it was announced that Nishikiori and Uekusa would leave Johnny & Associates within the same year. The name Shonentai would remain, and Higashiyama would continue his performing career.

=== Retirement from entertainment and presidency of Smile-Up (2023–2026) ===
On September 5, 2023, Higashiyama succeeded Julie Keiko Fujishima as president of Johnny & Associates, which was later renamed Smile-Up on October 17 of the same year. Fujishima resigned following the sexual assault scandal involving the company's founder, Johnny Kitagawa, and the investigation report highlighted the "negative effects of family management." On the same day, Higashiyama held a press conference and announced that he would retire from show business by the end of 2023 to focus on his company’s business.

Higashiyama and Julie are the same age and have been close since they met at 14, "like childhood friends," he said. Julie also did styling and management work for Shonentai, the boy band to which Higashiyama belongs, while she was still a college student. Over the years, they developed a trusting relationship in which they could consult each other about anything. Julie is the niece of Johnny Kitagawa and the daughter of Mary Yasuko Fujishima, Kitagawa's elder sister. Mary served as vice president of Johnny's for many years and was reportedly in charge of management aspects, including the company's substantive operations. It is said that Mary was particularly fond of Masahiko Kondō and Higashiyama; it was sometimes said that "Kondō is the first son" (the most powerful person among Johnny's talents) and "Higashiyama is the second son" (the second most powerful person). After Kondo left Johnny's in 2021 due to his own adultery scandal, Higashiyama came to be regarded as "Johnny's first son" in both name and reality.

After the Johnny Kitagawa sexual abuse scandal came to light in 2023, Julie initially sought an outside president, but all requests were turned down. Hideaki Takizawa, who had retired as a talent and became vice president after Kitagawa died in 2019, was considered another strong successor. However, he left the company in October 2022 and later founded his own entertainment agency, Tobe. Takizawa was close to Kitagawa in his later years and was said to have been directly nominated as his successor. Julie's mother, Mary, had already died in August 2021.

Ultimately, in early August 2023, Julie asked Higashiyama to become president, relying on their long-standing and trusting relationship. Higashiyama expressed that he was very worried when he received the request and thought about it overnight. However, he decided to accept it because he believed it was his destiny. He also reportedly took over as president to fulfill his responsibilities as the "first son" of the company.

With this announcement, his appearances on TV Asahi's information variety program Sunday Live! and the TBS Television documentary program Birth Day, in which he had served as a host since the show's inception in 2005, also came to an end after the second episode in the same month.

On December 26, Higashiyama made his final appearance on stage before his retirement at his solo dinner show, Noriyuki Higashiyama Dinner Show 2023, held at the ANA InterContinental Tokyo. This performance marked his last as an entertainer. The show, which had not taken place since 2002, was held in both Osaka and Tokyo for the 2023 edition. Surrounded by excited voices, applause, and audience singing, Higashiyama performed a total of 24 songs, including selections from his time as a member of Shonentai. Nostalgic images from various moments of his artistic life played in the background, culminating in an end roll that showcased his performances up to that point, ending with a heartfelt thank-you message.

Higashiyama's last appearance on television was in the TV Asahi drama Hissatsu Shigotonin, which was broadcast on December 29, 2023. This popular jidaigeki had been ongoing since he took over the lead role in 2007.

On December 31, 44 years after he entered show business in 1979, he retired from the public stage with a final message on his paid member blog, stating, "I would be grateful if someday people could understand that I chose this kind of life."

Higashiyama stepped down as president of Smile-Up on September 30, 2026, upon the expiration of his term. He was succeeded on October 1 by Masayuki Yamada, a lawyer who had served as the company's chief compliance officer.

== Personal life ==
On October 23, 2010, he married actress Yoshino Kimura. They had been in a relationship for about two and a half years since performing together on stage in March 2008. Their first child, a daughter, was born in 2011, followed by their second child, also a daughter, in 2013.

== Awards ==
- 56th ACA National Arts Festival (2001) - Theater Division Excellence Award for Musical The Christmas Box
- 2008 Japanese Movie Critics Awards - Best Actor for Yamazakura
- 30th Hashida Awards (2022) - Reason for Award: He has been active in a wide range of TV dramas and host roles, including Seven Detectives (TV Asahi) and Sunday Live! (TV Asahi) and other dramas and host for many years. He is also a hero in the hearts of Sugako Hashida's works (On Inochi, The Tale of Genji (TBS Television (Japan)), etc.).

== Filmography ==
=== Film ===
- Love Forever (1983)
- Aitsu to Lullaby (1983) – Hiroshi Machida
- Nineteen (1987) – East
- Maji! (1991) – Motoki Shirogane
- Tengoku no Taizai (1992) – Detective Aoki
- Makoto (2005) – Makoto Shirakawa
- Yamazakura (2008) – Yaichirō Tezuka
- Ogawa no Hotori (2011) – Sakunosuke Inui
- Genji Monogatari: Sennen no Nazo (2011) – Fujiwara no Michinaga
- Eight Ranger (2012) – Terrorist group leader
- Trick The Movie: Last Stage (2014) – Shinichi Kagami
- Eight Ranger 2 (2014) – Terrorist group leader
- Laughing Under the Clouds (2018) – Iwakura Tomomi
- Perfect Strangers (2021) - Sanpei Koyama

=== Television ===
- Youth rebel Part2 (1983) - as Keiichi Miyazawa
- Shinsengumi I: Okita Sōji: A Time of Love and Youth (1987) - starring Okita Sōji
  - Shinsengumi II: Ikedaya incident (1987)
- A person working in the television industry in the Wilderness (1987)
- Meibugyo Tōyama no Kin-san Series (1988 - 1992, TV Asahi) - as Shingo Mizuki
  - Meibugyo Tōyama no Kin-san 1st series (1988)
  - Meibugyo Tōyama no Kin-san 2nd series (1989)
  - Meibugyo Tōyama no Kin-san 3rd series (July 1990 - March 1991)
  - Meibugyo Tōyama no Kin-san Special: Edo Castle Overthrown! The Red-Haired Woman Spied On (1992)
- Jikandesuyo (It's Time!) (1988) - as Azuma Yu
- Clash of the Men! Part 1 (1988)
  - Clash of the Men! Part 2 (1988)
- Minamoto no Yoshitsune (1990) - starring Minamoto no Yoshitsune
- Jikandesuyo New Year's Special: Ume-no-Yu's Wedding is Full of Gags (1990) - as Akira Yamanouchi
- Jikandesuyo Murder Case: One Dead Body Floats in Ume no Yu (1990)
- Kunichan's Never-Ending TV "Christmas Gift: Christmas Eve Once More..." (1990)
- Wakasama Samurai Capture: The Secrets of the Inner Palace of Edo Castle (1991) - as Wakasama (Harunaga Tokugawa)
- Flower Labyrinth: The Woman from Shanghai (1991) - Playing the role of Akira Toudou
- Dreaming of a Journey (1991) - starring Minoru Aihara
- My Brother (1991) - starring Shigeo Mori
- Hana no Iro (1991) - as Kikuo Kato (Kabuki actor, Moriwaka Sanokawa)
- The Gypsy's Dream: The Legend of the Mysteries of Spain (1991) - starring Sho
- The Tale of Genji - The First Volume (1991) - starring Hikaru Genji
  - The Tale of Genji, Book Two (1992) - Yugiri
- NHK Taiga drama
  - Taiga drama Ryukyu no Kaze (1993) - as starring Keitai
  - Taiga drama Chūshingura (1999) - as Asano Naganori
  - Taiga drama Burning Flower (2015) - as Katsura Kogoro
- Onna no Ie (1993) - as Tadayuki (young master)
- Masterpiece Mystery Selection I: Three Widows (1993) - Playing the role of Hitoshi Eto
- Wataru Seken wa Oni Bakari 2nd Series 25th Special (1993) - Playing the role of Tadanori Oki
- Surgeon Saeko Arimori Sayonara Special (1993) - Kazushi Machimura
- Daichūshingura (1994) - Asano Naganori
- Embraced by the Night (1994) - Ryusei Kamiya
- Seichō Matsumoto special project Yakko no staircase (1995) - starring Michio Sayama (Miyasaka)
- The Chef (1995) - starring Takumi Ajisawa
- Someone is in Love with Someone (1996) - as Takeo Yasuda
- Dear Woman (1996) - Playing the lead role of Tamon Ishimaru
  - Dear Woman Special (1997)
- I'm glad I don't love you too much (1998) - starring Yotaro Nakajima
- Heisei married couple's tea bowl (2000) - starring Mitsutaro Kanamoto
  - Heisei married couples' tea bowl special - Mother became wind... (2000)
  - Sequel to Heisei married couples' tea bowl (2002)
- Your Yuko is Crying (2001) - starring Hekishi Yuki / Benishi Yuki
- Hatsurai (2003) - Kajii Hannosuke
- Seichō Matsumoto's Testimony (2004) - starring Teiichiro Ishino as Ishino[80].
- New Detective Munesue Series (2005 - 2019, TV Asahi) - starring Koichiro Munai
  - Detective Munesue's Investigation File - Glass Lovers (2005, Seiichi Morimura 40th Anniversary Commemorative Project)
  - Detective Munesue's Pure White Proof (2007)
  - Detective Munesue's Cloud Sea of Youth (2008)
  - Detective Munesue's Apocalypse (2009)
  - Detective Munesue's Immoral Poetry (2011)
  - Detective Munesue's Dead Sea Foreshadowing (2012)
  - Detective Munesue's Night Rainbow (2014)
  - Detective Munesue's Black Festival (2015)
  - Detective Munesue's False Perfect Crime (2016)
  - Detective Munesue's Deadly Fate (2017)
  - Detective Munesue's Black Bonds (2019)
- Kuitan (gourmand detective) (2006) - starring Seiya Takano
  - Kuitan Special - I'm going to eat all of Hong Kong (2006)
  - Kuitan 2 (2007)
- Byakkotai: The First and Second Nights (2007) - as Matsudaira Yoriyasu
- Hissatsu Shigotonin Series (2007) - starring Kogoro Watanabe
  - Hissatsu Shigotonin 2007 (2007)
  - Hissatsu Shigotonin 2009 New Year Special (2009)
  - Hissatsu Shigotonin 2009 (2009)
  - Hissatsu Shigotonin 2010 (2010)
  - Hissatsu Shigotonin 2012 (2012)
  - Hissatsu Shigotonin 2013 (2013)
  - Hissatsu Shigotonin 2014 (2014)
  - Hissatsu Shigotonin 2015 (2015)
  - Hissatsu Shigotonin 2016 (2016)
  - Hissatsu Shigotonin (2018)
  - Hissatsu Shigotonin 2019 (2019)
  - Hissatsu Shigotonin 2020 (2020)
  - Hissatsu Shigotonin (2022)
  - Hissatsu Shigotonin (2023)
  - Hissatsu Shigotonin (2023)
- GM - Odorire Doctor (2010) - as Hideo Goto (Fire Goto)
- Ikkyu-san (2012) - as Ashikaga Yoshimitsu
  - Ikkyu-san 2 (2013)
- Ōoka Echizen Series (2013 - 2023, NHK BS Premium) - starring Ōoka Tadasuke
  - Ooka Echizen (2013)
  - Ooka Echizen 2 (2014)
  - Ooka Echizen 3 (2016)
  - Ooka Echizen Special (2017)
  - Ooka Echizen 4 (2018)
  - Ooka Echizen Special - Famous Judges Connecting Parent and Child (2019)
  - Ooka Echizen 5 (2020)
  - Ooka Echizen Special - Hatsuharu ni scattered Kageboushi (2021)
  - Ooka Echizen 6 (2022)
  - Ooka Echizen Special - Great Turmoil! Shirazu of Fate (2023)
- The Seven Meetings (2013) - starring Manji Harashima
- The Partner - To my beloved friends of 100 years (2013) - starring Sakitaro Asaba / Tetsuya Suzuki
- XXX Wife (2015) - Playing the role of Masazumi Kubota, news anchor
- Yokokuhan: The Pain (2015) - starring Eiji Sakuma
- Seven Detectives Series (2015 - , TV Asahi) - starring Yuu Amagi
  - Seven Detectives 1st Series (2015)
  - Seven Detectives 2nd Series (2016)
  - Seven Detectives 3rd series (2017)
  - Seven Detectives Fourth Series (2018)
  - Seven Detectives 5th series (2019)
  - Seven Detectives 6th series (2020)
  - Seven Detectives 7th series (2021)
  - Seven Detectives 8th series (2022)
  - Seven Detectives 9th series (2023)
- Nobunaga Moyu (2016) - starring as Oda Nobunaga
- Futsubun ga ichiban - Writer Shuhei Fujisawa: A Word from My Father (2016) - starring Shuhei Fujisaw
- Seichō Matsumoto Hanamitsu no Nai Mori (2017) - starring Ryusuke Umeki
- Sand no Kiki (2019) - starring Eitaro Imanishi
- Special investigation department 9 season 6 final episode (2023) - as Yu Amagi

=== Dubbing ===
==== Live-action ====
- We Bought a Zoo – Benjamin Mee (Matt Damon)

==== Animation ====
- Brother Bear – Kenai

== Stage ==
Title	Year	Role	Ref.
Okita Sōji	1988	Starring Okita Sōji	
Nayotake	1990	Starring Ishinokamino Fumimaro	
Barcelona Monogatari	1991	Starring Rafael Taranto	
Gari	1993	Okada	
Life	1994	Ohkura Shingo	
Spring is in full bloom	1995 / 2003	Sentaro Onoue / Shoya Saeki	
Singin' in the Rain	1996	Starring Don Lockwood	
Fukagawa Shigure	1997	Kamio Saumanosuke	
Both flowers and storms - The Marriage Hagiographer's Tale of Sato and Keisuke	1999	Keisuke Tsumura	
Millennium Shock	2000	Kōichi's deceased brother / Ghost	
Musical The Christmas Box	2001	Starring Richard Evans / David Parkin	
Romeo and Juliet	2004	Starring Romeo	
Tsukiko's Moon and the Tango	2005	Shinichiro Kashu	
Farewell My Concubine	2008	Starring Cheng Dieyi	
Broadway Musical Curtains	2010	Starring Lieutenant Frank Choffee	
Madame de Sade / My Friend Hitler	2011	Starring Renée, the Marquis de Sade / Starring Ernst Röhm	
The King's Speech	2012	Starring Bertie (George VI)	
No Words, No Time - Tears falling into the sky	2013	Starring The man	
Frankenstein	2013	Starring Dr. Frankenstein / The creature	
Joan d'Arc	2014	Charles VII of France	
Dorobou Yakusha	2018	Maezono	
Chocolate Donuts	2020-2021 / 2023	Starring Rudy	

== Book ==
- Higashiyama-Style: Noriyuki Higashiyama Photo Collection (December 15, 1990, Fusosha Publishing) Photo/Katsuo Hanzawa
- Noriyuki Higashiyama (December 17, 1998, Magazine House, ISBN 9784838711024) - A photo essay based on the serial "Higashiyama Noriyuki's My favorite scene" in the magazine "Raku", with new photos and articles added.
- Noriyuki Higashiyama talking about Makoto (February 18, 2005, Pia) - Dialogue and Photobook (published by Pia, Feb. 18, 2005, ISBN 9784835615097)
- Show Lovery River (Written by Show Aikawa / Published by Pia on March 3, 2005, ISBN 9784835615073) - Appeared as one of the guests in a book written by Show Aikawa. Talk 3: Noriyuki Higashiyama and Show Aikawa, two men who keep on running.
- Kawasaki Kid (June 4, 2010, Asahi Shimbun Publications Inc, ISBN 9784022507563 / August 7, 2015, Asahi Sonorama, ISBN 9784022618351) - A reconstructed version of the serial "Hitherto and Hereafter" from the magazine "Asahi Weekly," with new additions such as a document of a visit to his hometown Kawasaki. Essays on his half life
