= Chunichi Theatre =

Performing arts venue in Nagoya, Japan

Coordinates: 35.1684°N 136.9096°E

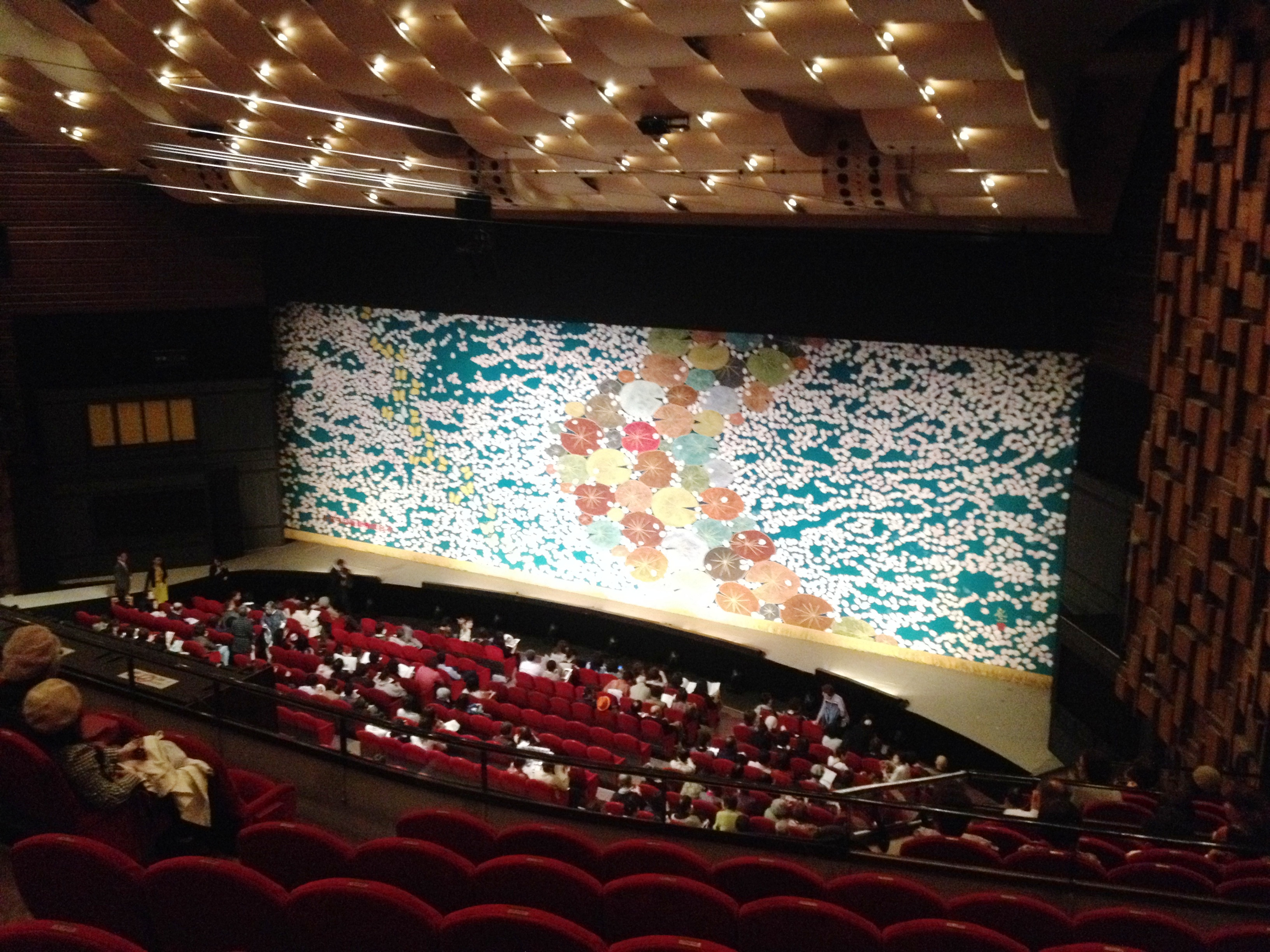
Interior of the Chunichi Theatre (2015)

The Chunichi Theatre (中日劇場, Chūnichi Gekijō) was a venue for the performing arts in Nagoya, Aichi Prefecture, Japan. It closed on March 25, 2018. The theatre was located inside the Chunichi Building. Performances such as kabuki and musicals were shown there.

== See also ==
- Aichi Arts Center
- Misono-za
