= Kamen Butōkai =

1985 single by Shonentai

Single by Shonentai

from the album Best of Shonentai
- Released: 12 December 1985
- Genre: Idol Kayōkyoku
- Length: 3:42
- Label: Warner Pioneer
- Songwriters: Kyōhei Tsutsumi, Motoki Funayama, Tetsuya Chiaki
- Producer: Johnny Kitagawa

Shonentai singles chronology
"Kamen Butōkai" (1985)	"Decameron no Densetsu" (1986)

"Kamen Butōkai" (仮面舞踏会) is the debut single by Japanese idol group Shonentai. The single was released on 12 December 1985 under Warner Pioneer label. They performed this song on the 37th Kōhaku Uta Gassen.

== Background ==
The beginning of the phrase, "Tonight ya ya ya, tear" was the idea not by the lyricist but one of the members, Nishikiori. For the arranger, Funayama, it was his most difficult work to be published during his career, due to big pressure from producer Johnny Kitagawa to produce the best debut song for his idol group.

The single has been released in 3 different editions with each including different B-Side tracks: "Nihon Yoitoko Makafushigi", "One Step Beyond" and "Harukaze ni Iine". The single has been included only in the compilations albums along with two B-side songs.

== Commercial performance ==
The single debuted number 1 in the weekly Oricon singles chart and became the third best-selling single of 1986 there with over 450,000 copies sold.

With this single, they won numerous awards in the 28th Japan Record Awards, 37th FNS Music Festival and in the 1986's Japan Music Awards.

== Track listing ==
=== Type A ===
7-inch single
No.	Title	Lyrics	Music	Arranger(s)	Length
1.	"Kamen Butōkai"	Tetsuya Chiaki	Kyōhei Tsutsumi	Motoki Funayama	4:05
2.	"Nihon Yoitoko Makafushigi"	Nomura	Yoshio Nomura	Funayama	4:09

=== Type B ===
7-inch single
No.	Title	Lyrics	Music	Arranger(s)	Length
2.	"Harukaze ni Iine"	Tomo Miyashita	Ken Satō	Satoshi Nakamura	4:09

=== Type C ===
7-inch single
No.	Title	Lyrics	Music	Arranger(s)	Length
2.	"One Step Beyond"	S.A.Williams	Alan O'Day	Funayama	4:09

== Cover ==
In the yearly television show Johnny's Count Down Live, the junior groups performing every year the debut song.

In 2015, another group from the same agency, Arashi covered "Nihon Yoitoko Makafushigi" in their studio album Japonism.

== See also ==
- 1985 in Japanese music
