= Aoyama Theatre =

Coordinates: 35.6623°N 139.7074°E

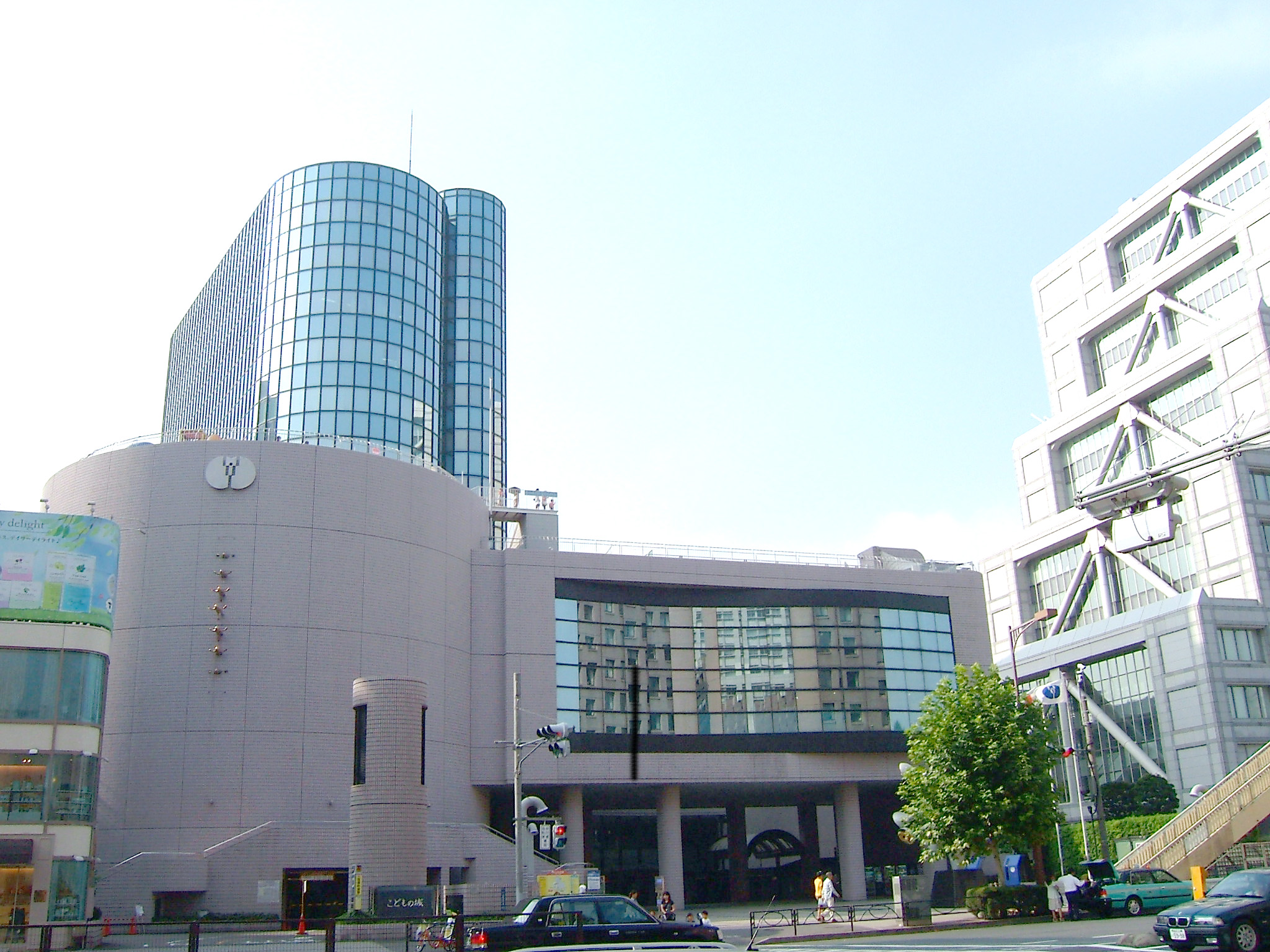
- Interactive map of Aoyama Theatre
- Location: Shibuya, Tokyo, Japan
- Capacity: 1,200
- Type: Indoor theatre

Construction
- Opened: November 1985
- Closed: 30 January 2015

The Aoyama Theatre (青山劇場, Aoyama Gekijō) was a theatre at the National Children's Castle (こどもの城, Kodomo no shiro) in Shibuya, Tokyo, Japan. The theatre opened in November 1985, and had a capacity of 1,200 seats. It closed on 30 January 2015.
