= Wataru Seken wa Oni Bakari =

- Also known as: Sugako Hashida Drama Wataru Seken wa Oni Bakari; Making It Through
- Genre: Drama
- Written by: Sugako Hashida
- Starring: Takuya Fujioka; Hisano Yamaoka; Aiko Nagayama; Izumi Pinko; Yoshiko Nakada
- Narrated by: Kōji Ishizaka
- Country of origin: Japan
- Original language: Japanese
- No. of seasons: 10
- No. of episodes: 502

Production
- Production company: TBS

Original release
- Network: JNN (TBS)
- Release: October 11, 1990 – September 29, 2011

Sugako Hashida Drama Wataru Seken wa Oni Bakari (橋田壽賀子ドラマ 渡る世間は鬼ばかり) (Making It Through) is a Japanese television drama series which first aired on TBS in 1990.

== Cast ==
- Takuya Fujioka / Ken Utsui as Daikichi Okakura
- Hisano Yamaoka as Setsukon Okakura
- Aiko Nagayama
- Izumi Pinko
- Yoshiko Nakada
- Kazuki Enari
- Takuzō Kadono
- Takaaki Enoki as Hisamitsu Aoyama
- Masako Izumi (4th series)
- Kunihiko Mitamura
- Masaki Kanda
- Satsohi Tokushige
- Harue Akagi as Miki Kojima

== Episodes ==
Season	Episodes	Debut	Ending
1	48	October 11, 1990	September 26, 1991
2	49	April 15, 1993	March 31, 1994
3	50	April 4, 1996	March 27, 1997
4	51	October 1, 1998	September 30, 1999
5	50	October 5, 2000	September 27, 2001
6	51	April 4, 2002	March 27, 2003
7	51	April 1, 2004	March 31, 2005
8	50	April 4, 2006	March 29, 2007
9	49	April 3, 2008	March 26, 2009
Final	47	October 14, 2010	September 29, 2011
