= List of songs recorded by AKB48 =

This is a list of songs recorded by the Japanese girl groups AKB48, SKE48, NMB48, HKT48, NGT48, SDN48, Nogizaka46 and Keyakizaka46, their members and subgroups, alphabetized by the romanized title of the song. Works released after graduation are not included. Songs with multiple versions or that were recorded by different groups are only counted once, unless they were released under different names.

== 0–9 ==
- "1%" (by Tomomi Itano)
- "1! 2! 3! 4! Yoroshiku!" (by SKE48)
- "1 Gallon no Ase" (by SDN48)
- "10 Krone to Pan" (by Haruka Kodama, Reina Fujie, Nao Furuhata, Sayaka Yamamoto, Yui Yokoyama)
- "10nen Go no Kimi e" (by Tomomi Itano)
- "10nen Sakura" (by AKB48)
- "12 Byō" (by HKT48)
- "12/31" (by NMB48)
- "12gatsu no Kangarū" (by SKE48)
- "13nichi no Kinyōbi" (by Under Members)
- "16iro no Yume Crayon" (from SKE48 Team KII 3rd stage "Ramune no Nomikata")
- "16nin Shimai no Uta" (from AKB48 Team K 4th stage "Saishū Bell ga Naru")
- "100 Meter Combini" (from AKB48 Team B 5th stage "Theater no Megami")
- "100nen Saki demo" (from NMB48 Team N 3rd stage "Koko ni Datte Tenshi wa Iru")
- "109 (Marukyū)" (by AKB48)
- "1994nen no Raimei" (from Team Surprise 1st stage "Jūryoku Sympathy")
- "365 Nichi no Kamihikouki" (by AKB48)
- "3seconds" (by Persona)
- "47 no Suteki na Machi e" (by Team 8)
- "50%" (from AKB48 Himawarigumi 2nd stage "Yume o Shinaseru Wake ni Ikanai")
- "6gatsu 29 Nichi" (by French Kiss)
- "7ji 12fun no Hatsukoi" (from AKB48 Team A 4th stage "Tadaima Renaichū")
- "8 Years" (by Tomomi Itano)

== A ==
- "Abazure" (by Undergirls B)
- "After Rain" (by AKB48)
- "Ai, Chuseyo" (by SDN48)
- "Ai ni Ikō" (from AKB48 Team K 4th stage "Saishū Bell ga Naru")
- "Ai no Imi o Kangaete Mita" (by Undergirls)
- "Ai no Iro" (from AKB48 Team K 5th stage "Saka Agari")
- "Ai no Kazu" (by Team KII)
- "Ai no Mama de" (by Misaki Iwasa)
- "Ai no Mōfu" (by AKB48)
- "Ai no Rule" (by Sentai Hero Unit)
- "Ai no Stripper" (from AKB48 Team B 5th stage "Theater no Megami")
- "Ai o Kure" (from AKB48 Team A 6th stage "Mokugekisha")
- "Ai to Pride" (from AKB48 Himawarigumi 2nd stage "Yume o Shinaseru Wake ni Ikanai")
- "Ai yo, Ugokanaide" (by Reiko Nishikunihara)
- "Aisareru Tame ni" (from SDN48 1st stage "Yūwaku no Garter")
- "Aisareru to Iu Koto" (by Ice from AKB48)
- "Aishisugiru to..." (by Atsuko Maeda)
- "Aishite-love-ru!" (by SKE48)
- "Aitakatta" (by AKB48)
- "Aitakatta Kamoshirenai" (by Nogizaka46)
- "Ajisai-bashi" (by Misaki Iwasa)
- "Akai Sweet Pea" (by Misaki Iwasa)
- "AKB48" (from AKB48 Team A 1st stage "PARTY ga Hajimaru yo")
- "AKB Festival" (from Team Surprise 1st stage "Jūryoku Sympathy")
- "AKB Sanjō!" (from AKB48 Team A 5th stage "Renai Kinshi Jōrei")
- "Akkanbe Bashi" (by Watarirōka Hashiritai)
- "Akogare no Popstar" (from AKB48 Team A 6th stage "Mokugekisha")
- "Akushu no Ai" (from SKE48 Team KII 3rd stage "Ramune no Nomikata")
- "ALIVE" (by Team K)
- "All In" (from SDN48 1st stage "Yūwaku no Garter")
- "Almond Croissant Keikaku" (by Team BII)
- "Already" (by Not Yet)
- "Always" (by Tomomi Itano)
- "Amai Kokansetsu" (by Megumi Ohori)
- "Amanojaku" (by French Kiss)
- "Ambulance" (by Yurigumi)
- "Ame no Dōbutsuen" (from AKB48 Team K 2nd stage "Seishun Girls")
- "Ame no Pianist" (from SKE48 Team S 2nd stage "Te o Tsunaginagara")
- "Anata ga Ite Kureta Kara" (by AKB48)
- "Anata no Tame ni Hikitai" (by Erika Ikuta)
- "Anata to Watashi" (by Yuki Kashiwagi)
- "Ano Hi Boku wa Tossa ni Uso o Tsuita" (by Nogizaka46)
- "Ano Hi no Fūrin" (by Waiting Girls)
- "Ano Koro no Sneaker" (from AKB48 Team A 5th stage "Renai Kinshi Jōrei")
- "Antenna" (from SKE48 Team S 3rd stage "Seifuku no Me")
- "Anti" (by Team Kenkyūsei)
- "Answer" (by No3b)
- "Aoi Mirai" (by Watarirōka Hashiritai)
- "Aoi Tsuki ga Miteru kara" (from NMB48 Team N 3rd stage "Koko ni Datte Tenshi wa Iru")
- "Aozora Cafe" (by AKB48)
- "Aozora Kataomoi" (by SKE48)
- "Aozora no Soba ni Ite" (by AKB48)
- "Aozora yo Sabishikunai ka?" (by AKB48, SKE48, NMB48, HKT48)
- "Arashi no Yoru ni wa" (from AKB48 Team B 5th stage "Theater no Megami")
- "Are kara Earl Grey o Nonde Inai" (by Not Yet)
- "Area K" (by DIVA)
- "Arigatō" (from AKB48 Team B 4th stage "Idol no Yoake")
- "Aru Aki no Hi no Koto" (by French Kiss)
- "Asatte, Jamaica" (by Haruna Kojima)
- "Ashita mo Waraō" (by Yuki Kashiwagi)
- "Ashita no Tame ni Kiss o" (from AKB48 Team K 6th stage "RESET")
- "Ashita wa Ashita no Kimi ga Umareru" (by Chocolove from AKB48)
- "Asphalt no Namida" (by NMB48 Team Kenkyūsei)
- "Atto Iu Ma no Shōjo" (by Kōen Ganbattagumi)
- "Aun no Kiss" (by Shirogumi)
- "Avocado Ja nē Shi..." (by Mayu Watanabe, Rino Sashihara)
- "Awajishima no Tamanegi" (by SDN48)

== B ==
- "B Garden" (by Team B)
- "B Stars" (from AKB48 Team B 4th stage "Idol no Yoake")
- "Baatari GO!" (by NMB48 Undergirls)
- "Baby! Baby! Baby!" (by AKB48)
- "Bakuhatsu Professor" (by Not Yet)
- "Banana Kakumei" (by Team E)
- "Band o Yarō yo" (by Magical Band)
- "Banzai Venus" (by SKE48)
- "Bara no Gishiki" (from Team Surprise 2nd stage "Bara no Gishiki")
- "Bara no Kajitsu" (by Undergirls)
- "Barrette" (by Nogizaka46)
- "Bazooka Hou Hassha!" (by Shirogumi)
- "Beach Sandal" (from AKB48 Team K 2nd stage "Seishun Girls")
- "Beginner" (by AKB48)
- "Believe in Myself" (by DIVA)
- "Best By..." (from SDN48 1st stage "Yūwaku no Garter")
- "Bike to Sidecar" (by 14 Carat)
- "Bikini wa Niawanai" (by Watarirōka Hashiritai 7)
- "Bin no Futa" (by French Kiss)
- "BINGO!" (by AKB48)
- "Biorythm" (by French Kiss)
- "Bird" (from AKB48 Team A 3rd stage "Dareka no Tame ni")
- "Birthday Wedding" (by Yuki Kashiwagi)
- "Blue Light Yokohama" (by Misaki Iwasa)
- "Blue Rose" (from AKB48 Team K 2nd stage "Seishun Girls")
- "Boku Dake no Value" (by Undergirls)
- "Black Boy" (from SDN48 1st stage "Yūwaku no Garter")
- "Boku ga Ikanakya Dare ga Ikunda?" (by Marika Ito, Sayuri Inoue, Yuri Saito, Reika Sakurai, Kana Nakada, Nanase Nishino, Yumi Wakatsuki)
- "Boku ga Iru Basho" (by Nogizaka46)
- "Boku ga Maketa Natsu" (by Shirogumi")
- "Boku ga Mō Sukoshi Daitan Nara" (by Akagumi)
- "Boku ni Dekiru Koto" (by Team K)
- "Boku no Taiyō" (by AKB48)
- "Boku no Sakura" (from AKB48 Team B 3rd stage "Pajama Drive")
- "Boku no Sei" (by Tomomi Itano)
- "Boku no Summertime blues" (by Tomomi Kasai)
- "Boku no Uchiage Hanabi" (from AKB48 Team K 2nd stage "Seishun Girls")
- "Boku no Yell" (by Theater Girls)
- "Boku to Juliet to Jet Coaster" (from AKB48 Himawarigumi 1st stage "Boku no Taiyō")
- "Boku wa Ganbaru" (by Anna Iriyama, Rina Kawaei, Minami Takahashi, Yui Yokoyama, Mayu Watanabe, Yuko Oshima, Yuki Kashiwagi, Haruna Kojima, Haruka Shimazaki)
- "Boku wa Matteru" (by NMB48)
- "Bokura no Eureka" (by NMB48)
- "Bokura no Kaze" (from SKE48 Team S 2nd stage "Te o Tsunaginagara")
- "Bokura no Kizuna" (by SKE48)
- "Bokura no Regatta" (by Shirogumi)
- "Bokutachi no Offshore" (by Not Yet)
- "Bokutachi wa Ima Hanashiau Beki nanda" (by Yuki Kashiwagi, Tomomi Itano)
- "Bowling Ganbō" (from SKE48 Team KII 3rd stage "Ramune no Nomikata")
- "Boy Hunt no Hōhō Oshiemasu" (by Yuria Kizaki, Rino Sashihara, Haruka Shimazaki, Fuuko Yagura)
- "Boyfriend no Tsukurikata" (from AKB48 Team K 4th stage "Saishū Bell ga Naru")
- "Brunch wa Blueberry" (by Atsuko Maeda)
- "Buenos Aires ni Ame ga Furu" (by Minami Takahashi)
- "Bukiyō Taiyō" (by SKE48)
- "Bungee Sengen" (by SKE48)
- "Bus Stop" (by No3b)
- "Bye Bye Bye" (from AKB48 Himawarigumi 2nd stage "Yume o Shinaseru Wake ni Ikanai")

== C ==
- "Canarya Syndrome" (by Shirogumi)
- "Candle no Shin" (by Yuki Kashiwagi, Asuka Kuramochi)
- "Candy" (from AKB48 Team B 5th stage "Theater no Megami")
- "Cattleya no Hana wo Miru Tabi ni Omoidasu" (from NMB48 Team N 3rd stage "Koko ni Datte Tenshi wa Iru")
- "Chime wa Love Song" (from SKE48 Team S 2nd stage "Te o Tsunaginagara")
- "Chireba Ii no Ni..." (by AKB48)
- "Cinderella wa Damasarenai" (from AKB48 Team K 2nd stage "Seishun Girls")
- "Chance no Junban" (by AKB48)
- "Chewing Gum no Aji ga Naku Naru Made" (by Upcoming Girls)
- "Chika Suido" (by DiVA)
- "Chikatetsu no Teddy Boy" (by Watarirōka Hashiritai 7)
- "Chinmoku" (by Yuki Kashiwagi)
- "Choco no Dorei" (by SKE48)
- "Choco no Yukue" (from SKE48 Team S 2nd stage "Te o Tsunaginagara")
- "Chocolate" (by Chocolove from AKB48)
- "Chōdai, Darling!" (by AKB48 x Putcho Girls)
- "Chokkaku Sunshine" (by Team 4)
- "Choose Me!" (by Team Young Jump)
- "Chotto Nekoze" (by Undergirls)
- "Christmas ga Ippai" (from AKB48 Team K 3rd stage "Nōnai Paradise")
- "Christmas Present" (by Persona)
- "Chū Shiyōze!" (by AKBIdoling!!!)
- "Class Kai no Ato de" (by Yuki Kashiwagi)
- "Classmate" (from AKB48 Team A 1st stage "PARTY ga Hajimaru yo")
- "Clone" (by Tomomi Itano)
- "Cloudy Sky" (by Haruna Kojima)
- "Come On!" (by Tomomi Itano)
- "Coming Soon" (by Boat Pier Senbatsu)
- "Confession" (from AKB48 Himawarigumi 2nd stage "Yume o Shinaseru Wake ni Ikanai")
- "Cool girl" (from AKB48 Team K 4th stage "Saishū Bell ga Naru")
- "Cosmos no Kioku" (by Shirogumi)
- "Cross" (from SKE48 Team KII 3rd stage "Ramune no Nomikata")
- "Cry" (by DiVA)

== D ==
- "DADA Machine Gun" (by Team KII)
- "Daiji na Jikan" (by AKB48)
- "Daisuki" (from SKE48 Team S 2nd stage "Te o Tsunaginagara")
- "Daisuki + Daikirai = Daisuki!" (by DIVA)
- "Dakedo..." (by AKB48)
- "Dakishimecha Ikenai" (by Undergirls)
- "Dakishimeraretara" (from AKB48 Team K 5th stage "Saka Agari")
- "Dakishimetai Kedo" (by Sayaka Yamamoto)
- "Dankeschon" (by Nogizaka46)
- "Dare ga Futari o Deawaseta no ka?" (from Team Surprise 2nd stage "Bara no Gishiki")
- "Dareka ga Nageta Ball" (by Undergirls)
- "Dareka no Sei ni wa Shinai" (by Akagumi)
- "Dareka no Tame ni ~What can I do for someone?" (from AKB48 Team A 3rd stage "Dareka no Tame ni)
- "Dareka Oshiete" (by Minami Takahashi)
- "Dareka wa Mikata" (by Misa Eto, Reika Sakurai, Yumi Wakatsuki)
- "Dark Side" (by Tomomi Itano)
- "Darkness" (by Seven Dancers)
- "Darui Kanji" (from AKB48 Team A 4th stage "Tadaima Renaichū")
- "Dazai Ozamu o Yonda ka?" (by Nana Yamada, Sayaka Yamamoto, Yui Yokoyama)
- "deal" (by Tomomi Itano)
- "Dear J" (by Tomomi Itano)
- "Dear my teacher" (by AKB48)
- "Deja vu" (from AKB48 Himawarigumi 1st stage "Boku no Taiyō")
- "Dekopin" (by Mai Shiraishi, Kazumi Takayama, Nanami Hashimoto, Mai Fukagawa, Sayuri Matsumura)
- "Demo ne Zutto" (by Yuki Kashiwagi)
- "Densha o Oriru" (by Team N)
- "Dessan" (from Team Surprise 1st stage "Jūryoku Sympathy")
- "Disco Hokenshitsu" (from SKE48 Team KII 3rd stage "Ramune no Nomikata")
- "DISCOVERY" (by DIVA)
- "DIVA!" (by DIVA)
- "Do Re Mi Fa Onchi" (by Next Girls)
- "Doga to Ballerina" (from NMB48 Team N 3rd stage "Koko ni Datte Tenshi wa Iru")
- "Doji" (by Watarirōka Hashiritai 7)
- "Doku Ringo o Tabesasete" (from AKB48 Team A 1st stage "PARTY ga Hajimaru yo")
- "Dōki" (by Haruka Shimazaki)
- "Dokugumo" (from AKB48 Team K 6th stage "RESET")
- "Don't Disturb!" (from AKB48 Team K 2nd stage "Seishun Girls")
- "Don't miss it!" (by Tomomi Itano)
- "Doro no Metronome" (by Umakuchi Hime)
- "Doryoku no Shizuku" (by Shirogumi)
- "Doshaburi no Seishun no Naka de" (by Shirogumi)
- "Doubt!" (from SKE48 Team S 3rd stage "Seifuku no Me")
- "Dragon Fruits no Tabegoro" (by French Kiss)
- "Dreamin' Girls" (from AKB48 Himawarigumi 1st stage "Boku no Taiyō")

== E ==
- "Ee Janaika" (by BABY GAMBA)
- "Eien Pressure" (by AKB48)
- "Eien Yori Tsuzuku Yō ni" (by OKL48)
- "End Roll" (from AKB48 Team K 5th stage "Saka Agari")
- "Enjō Rosen" (from AKB48 Team A 6th stage "Mokugekisha")
- "Enjoy your life!" (by Tomomi Kasai, Natsumi Matsubara, Yuko Oshima, Kana Kobayashi, Ayaka Umeda, Sae Miyazawa, Sayaka Yamamoto, Megumi Ohori, Kayo Noro)
- "Enkyori Poster" (by Team Play-Boy)
- "Erai Hito ni Naritakunai" (from AKB48 Team K 4th stage "Saishū Bell ga Naru")
- "Erande Rainbow" (by Tentōmu Chu!)
- "Eros no Trigger" (by Undergirls A)
- "Escape" (by SKE48)
- "Ettō Tsubame" (by Misaki Iwasa)
- "Everyday, Katyusha" (by AKB48)

== F ==
- "Fade Out" (by DiVA)
- "Faint" (from AKB48 Team A 4th stage "Tadaima Renaichū")
- "Fan Letter" (from AKB48 Team K 5th stage "Saka Agari")
- "Finland Miracle" (from SKE48 Team KII 3rd stage "Ramune no Nomikata")
- "First Love" (by Erena Ono)
- "First Rabbit" (by AKB48)
- "Flower" (by Atsuko Maeda)
- "Flying Get" (by AKB48)
- "For tenderness" (by DIVA)
- "For You, For Me" (by Tomomi Itano)
- "Fugiri" (from AKB48 Team K 5th stage "Saka Agari")
- "Fui ni" (by Tomomi Itano)
- "Fuku o Kita Ōsama" (by Watarirōka Hashiritai 7)
- "Fumo no Tochi wo Mankai ni" (from NMB48 Team N 3rd stage "Koko ni Datte Tenshi wa Iru")
- "Fumōna Yoru" (by Not Yet)
- "Furishite Maneshite" (from AKB48 Team K 5th stage "Saka Agari")
- "Fūsha ga Mieru Machi" (by Not Yet)
- "Fushidara na Natsu" (from AKB48 Team K 2nd stage "Seishun Girls")
- "Futari dake no Kioku" (by Aki Takajō)
- "Futari dake no Parade" (by Team KII)
- "Futari Nori no Jitensha" (from AKB48 Team B 3rd stage "Pajama Drive")
- "Futari wa Dekiteru" (by AKB48)
- "Futo Omou Koto" (by Minami Takahashi)
- "Futsū no Anata" (from SDN48 1st stage "Yūwaku no Garter")
- "Fuyu no Kamome" (by Shirogumi)
- "Fuyushōgun no Regret" (by Namba Teppōdai Sono Ni)

== G ==
- "GAGAGA" (by SDN48)
- "GALAXY of DREAMS" (by GALAXY of DREAMS)
- "Ganbariina" (from SDN48 1st stage "Yūwaku no Garter")
- "Gingham Check" (by AKB48)
- "Girl's Rule" (by Nogizaka46)
- "Girls' Talk" (by No3b)
- "Give Me Five!" (by AKB48)
- "Glass no I LOVE YOU" (from AKB48 Team A 2nd stage "Aitakatta")
- "Glory Days" (from SKE48 Team S 2nd stage "Te o Tsunaginagara")
- "Gōgaku Kiss" (from SKE48 Team S 3rd stage "Seifuku no Me")
- "Gokigen Naname na Mermaid" (from AKB48 Team B 3rd stage "Pajama Drive")
- "Gomen ne Jewel" (from AKB48 Team K 4th stage "Saishū Bell ga Naru")
- "Gomen ne, Summer" (by SKE48)
- "Gomennasai" (by Watarirōka Hashiritai)
- "Gondola Lift" (by Undergirls Yurigumi)
- "Greece no Kamotsusen" (by Not Yet)
- "Gū Gū Onaka" (by AKB48)
- "Gugutasu no Sora" (by Google+ Senbatsu)
- "Guilty love" (by Not Yet)
- "Guruguru Curtain" (by Nogizaka46)
- "Gūzen o Iiwake ni Shite" (by Nogizaka46)
- "Gūzen no Jūjiro" (by Undergirls)
- "Gūzen no Mikata" (by Asuka Kuramochi)
- "Gyakuten Ōjisama" (from AKB48 Team K 6th stage "RESET")
- "Gyu" (by Watarirōka Hashiritai)

== H ==
- "HA!" (by NMB48)
- "Hajimete no Drive" (by Team K)
- "Hajimete no Jelly Beans" (from AKB48 Himawarigumi 2nd stage "Yume o Shinaseru Wake ni Ikanai")
- "Hajimete no Hoshi" (from NMB48 Team N 3rd stage "Koko ni Datte Tenshi wa Iru")
- "Halation" (by Selection 8)
- "Halloween Night" (by AKB48)
- "Hana to Chire!" (from AKB48 Team K 3rd stage "Nōnai Paradise")
- "Hanabi wa Owaranai" (by Selection 8)
- "Hanamizuki" (by Misaki Iwasa)
- "Hanbunko" (by Minami Minegishi)
- "Hanikami Lollipop" (by Shirogumi)
- "Hanpa na Ikemen" (from AKB48 Team K 5th stage "Saka Agari")
- "Haru ga Kuru made" (from AKB48 Team A 4th stage "Tadaima Renaichū")
- "Haru Ichiban ga Fuku Koro" (from AKB48 Team B 4th stage "Idol no Yoake")
- "Hashire! Bicycle" (by Nogizaka46)
- "Hashire! Penguin" (by Team 4)
- "Hashiritai GO! GO! GO!" (by Watarirōka Hashiritai)
- "Hasute to Wasute" (by BKA48)
- "Hate" (by Team A)
- "Hatsukoi Butterfly" (by HKT48)
- "Hatsukoi Dash" (by Watarirōka Hashiritai)
- "Hatsukoi Hills" (by Rino Sashihara)
- "Hatsukoi no Fumikiri" (by SKE48)
- "Hatsukoi no Hito o Ima Demo" (by Nogizaka46)
- "Hatsukoi no Kagi" (from Team Surprise 2nd stage "Bara no Gishiki")
- "Hatsukoi no Yukue to Play Ball" (by NMB Seven)
- "Hatsukoi wa Minoranai" (by Ojarumaru Sisters)
- "Hatsukoi yo, Konnichiwa" (from AKB48 Team B 5th stage "Theater no Megami")
- "Hazumisaki" (by Undergirls B)
- "Heart Electric" (by AKB48)
- "Heart ga Kaze wo Hiita Yoru" (from AKB48 Himawarigumi 2nd stage "Yume o Shinaseru Wake ni Ikanai")
- "Heart Gata Virus" (from AKB48 Team A 5th stage "Renai Kinshi Jōrei")
- "Heart no Dasshutsu Game" (by Team 4)
- "Heart no Dokusenken" (by Miyuki Watanabe, Yuki Kashiwagi)
- "Heart no Ondo" (by No3b)
- "Heart no Vector" (from Team Surprise 1st stage "Jūryoku Sympathy")
- "Heavy Rotation" (by AKB48)
- "Hell or Heaven" (from Team Surprise 2nd stage "Bara no Gishiki")
- "Heso ga Magaru" (by Aika Ōta)
- "Hetappi Wink" (by Watarirōka Hashiritai 7)
- "Hidari Mune no Yūki" (by Under Members)
- "High School Days" (by Team Kenkyūsei)
- "Higurashi no Koi" (from AKB48 Himawarigumi 1st stage "Boku no Taiyō")
- "Hiiragi no Tsūgakuro" (by Watarirōka Hashiritai 7)
- "Hikaeme I Love You!" (by HKT48)
- "Hikkōshimashita" (from AKB48 Team K 6th stage "RESET")
- "Hikōkigumo" (from AKB48 Team A 5th stage "Renai Kinshi Jōrei")
- "Himawari" (from AKB48 Himawarigumi 1st stage "Boku no Taiyō")
- "Himitsu no Diary" (by Baby Elephants)
- "Hinadande wa Boku no Miryoku wa Ikanainda" (by Namba Teppōdai Sono San)
- "Hirahira" (by Not Yet)
- "Hirihiri no Hana" (by Not Yet)
- "Hiroi Sekai no Naka de Deaeta Koto" (by Yuki Kashiwagi)
- "Hissatsu Teleport" (from AKB48 Team B 3rd stage "Pajama Drive")
- "Hitei no Requiem" (from AKB48 Team K 5th stage "Saka Agari")
- "Hito Natsu no Hankōki" (by Next Girls)
- "Hito no Chikara" (by Undergirls)
- "Hito wa Naze Hashiru no ka?" (by Nogizaka46)
- "Hitori Omoi" (by DIVA)
- "Hitori Yogare" (by Nanase Nishino)
- "Hitsujikai no Tabi" (by Special Girls B)
- "Hizukehenkōsen" (from AKB48 Team K 2nd stage "Seishun Girls")
- "Hohoemi no Positive Thinking" (by Akagumi)
- "Hoka no Hoshi kara" (by Marika Ito, Sayuri Inoue, Yuri Saito, Reika Sakurai, Kana Nakada, Nanase Nishino, Yumi Wakatsuki)
- "Hōkago Race" (by Team S)
- "Hone Hone Waltz" (from AKB48 Team K 3rd stage "Nōnai Paradise")
- "Honest Man" (from AKB48 Team B 5th stage "Theater no Megami")
- "Hoola Hoop de GO! GO! GO!" (by Team S)
- "Hoshi no Mukōgawa" (from AKB48 Team A 6th stage "Mokugekisha")
- "Hoshi no Ondo" (from AKB48 Team A 1st stage "PARTY ga Hajimaru yo")
- "Hoshizora no Caravan" (by Shirogumi)
- "Hoshizora no Mistake" (from AKB48 Team K 6th stage "RESET")
- "Hoshokushatachi yo" (by Akagumi)
- "House!" (by Nogizaka46)
- "How Come?" (by Team K)
- "HHzue to Caffe Macchiato" (by Atsuko Maeda)
- "Hug-tomo" (by Not Yet)
- "Hungry Lion" (from Team Surprise 2nd stage "Bara no Gishiki")

== I ==
- "I love AICHI" (by Aichi Toyota Senbatsu)
- "I'm crying." (from AKB48 Team A 6th stage "Mokugekisha")
- "I'm sure." (from SDN48 1st stage "Yūwaku no Garter")
- "Ibitsu na Shinju" (from AKB48 Team A 6th stage "Mokugekisha")
- "Ibiza Girl" (by NMB48)
- "Ice no Kuchizuke" (by AKB48)
- "Ichi Ni no San" (by Yuko Oshima, Aki Takajō, Mariya Nagao, Airi Furukawa, Minami Minegishi)
- "Idol Nante Yobanaide" (from AKB48 Himawarigumi 1st stage "Boku no Taiyō")
- "Idol no Ōjya" (by Team H)
- "Idol no Yoake" (from AKB48 Team B 4th stage "Idol no Yoake")
- "Iede no Yoru" (by Team K)
- "If" (by French Kiss)
- "if no Mōsō" (by Rino Sashihara)
- "Ihōjin" (by Misaki Iwasa)
- "Iikagen no Susume" (by Haruka Katayama, Haruna Kojima, Mariko Shinoda, Sayaka Akimoto, Sae Miyazawa, Rena Matsui)
- "Iinjane?" (by No3b)
- "Iiwake Maybe" (by AKB48)
- "Ikiru Koto" (by Team A)
- "Ikirutte Subarashii" (from AKB48 Himawarigumi 2nd stage "Yume o Shinaseru Wake ni Ikanai")
- "Ikujinashi Masquerade" (by Rino Sashihara with AnRiRe)
- "Illumination" (by Tomomi Kasai)
- "Ima, Happy" (by Baragumi)
- "Ima, Kimi o Omō" (by HKT48)
- "Ima ga Ichiban" (by Umakuchi Hime)
- "Ima Kimi to Irareru Koto" (from SKE48 Team KII 3rd stage "Ramune no Nomikata")
- "In-Goal" (by NMB48)
- "Information" (by DiVA)
- "Innocence" (from SKE48 Team S 2nd stage "Te o Tsunaginagara")
- "Inochi no Imi" (from AKB48 Team A 6th stage "Mokugekisha")
- "Inochi no Tsukaimichi" (from AKB48 Team B 3rd stage "Pajama Drive")
- "Inseki no Kakuritsu" (from AKB48 Team B 5th stage "Theater no Megami")
- "Inugo o Hanaseru Otoko no Ko" (by Watarirōka Hashiritai 7)
- "Isshukan, Zenbu ga Getsuyōbi nara Ii no ni..." (by NMB48)
- "Itoshiki Natasha" (from AKB48 Team B 4th stage "Idol no Yoake")
- "Itoshiki Rival" (by Team K)
- "Itoshisa no Accel" (from AKB48 Team A 6th stage "Mokugekisha")
- "Itoshisa no defense" (from AKB48 Himawarigumi 1st stage "Boku no Taiyō")
- "Itoshisa o Marumete" (from Team Surprise 2nd stage "Bara no Gishiki")
- "Itsuka Mita Umi no Soko" (by Up-and-coming Girls)
- "Itsumo Soba ni" (by Asuka Kuramochi)
- "Itsunomanika, Yowaimonojime" (by Selection 8)
- "Itterasshai" (by AKB48)

== J ==
- "Jajauma Lady" (from SDN48 1st stage "Yūwaku no Garter")
- "Jane Doe" (by Minami Takahashi)
- "Jealousy no Alibi" (from SKE48 Team S 3rd stage "Seifuku no Me")
- "Jealousy Punch" (by Yuki Kashiwagi)
- "Jessica wa Door o Knock Shinai" (by No3b)
- "JESUS" (from AKB48 Team A 2nd stage "Aitakatta")
- "Jigsaw Puzzle 48" (from AKB48 Team K 6th stage "RESET")
- "Jiyūū no Kanata" (by Nogizaka46)
- "JJ ni Karitamono" (by Ayaka Umeda, Rie Kitahara, Asuka Kuramochi, Minami Takahashi, Akane Takayanagi, Nana Yamada)
- "JK Nemurihime" (from AKB48 Team A 5th stage "Renai Kinshi Jōrei")
- "Jōnetsu Highway" (from NMB48 Team N 3rd stage "Koko ni Datte Tenshi wa Iru")
- "Joshikōsei wa Yamerarenai" (from AKB48 Team B 4th stage "Idol no Yoake")
- "Jūjun na Slave" (by Team A)
- "Junai no Crescendo" (from AKB48 Team A 4th stage "Tadaima Renaichū")
- "Jung ya Freud no Baai" (by Special Girls C)
- "Jungle Gym" (by Sayaka Yamamoto)
- "Junjō Shugi" (from AKB48 Team B 3rd stage "Pajama Drive")
- "Junjō U-19" (by NMB48)
- "Jyuri-Jyuri Baby" (by Team S)
- "Jūryoku Sympathy" (from Team Surprise 1st stage "Jūryoku Sympathy")

== K ==
- "Kagami no Naka no Joan D'arc" (from AKB48 Team B 3rd stage "Pajama Drive")
- "Kairyū no Shima o" (by Mikumo Ando, Hina Kawago, Asuka Saito, Himeka Nakamoto, Seira Hatanaka, Hina Higuchi, Maaya Wada)
- "Kaisoku to Dōtai Shiryoku" (by Undergirls)
- "Kaiyūgyo no Capacity" (from AKB48 Team K 4th stage "Saishū Bell ga Naru")
- "Kakko warui I love you" (by French Kiss)
- "Kakumei no Uma" (by Manatsu Akimoto, Mai Shiraishi, Kazumi Takayama, Nanami Hashimoto, Mai Fukagawa, Sayuri Matsumura)
- "Kakushin ga Moterumono" (by Team A)
- "Kamigami no Ryōiki" (by SKE48)
- "Kamoku na Tsuki" (by Selection 8)
- "Kamonegikkusu" (by NMB48)
- "Kamujatan Bojō" (by Undergirls A)
- "Kanashiki Kinkyori Renai" (by Team B)
- "Kanashimi no Mirage" (by DiVA)
- "Kanojo ni Naremasu ka?" (from AKB48 Team K 6th stage "RESET")
- "Kanpeki Gu~no ne" (by Watarirōka Hashiritai)
- "Kare no Kitchen" (by Chocolove from AKB48)
- "Kareha no Station" (from SKE48 Team S 3rd stage "Seifuku no Me")
- "Kasa wa Iranai" (by Undergirls)
- "Kashaasa de Jihaku Suru" (by Undergirls B)
- "Kataomoi Finally" (by SKE48)
- "Kataomoi no Karage" (by Amakuchi Hime)
- "Kataomoi no Sotsugyōshiki" (from AKB48 Team K 3rd stage "Nōnai Paradise")
- "Kataomoi no Taikakusen" (from AKB48 Team B 4th stage "Idol no Yoake")
- "Kayōbi no Yoru, Suiyōbi no Asa" (from SKE48 Team S 2nd stage "Te o Tsunaginagara")
- "Kaza no Tower" (by Queen & Elizabeth)
- "Kazanbai" (by Yuki Kashiwagi)
- "Kibō no Hana" (by Not Yet)
- "Kaze no Rasen" (by Kojizaka46)
- "Kaze no Violin" (by Mayu Watanabe)
- "Kaze no Yukue" (by Asuka Kuramochi, Rino Sashihara, Minami Takahashi, Yuko Oshima, Minami Minegishi, Yuki Kashiwagi)
- "Kaze wa Fuiteiru" (by AKB48)
- "Keibetsu Shiteita Aijō" (by AKB48)
- "Keishasuru" (by Kojizaka46)
- "Kesenai Honō" (by Team S)
- "Kesshō" (by Shirogumi)
- "Ki ni Naru Tenkōsei" (from AKB48 Team K 3rd stage "Nōnai Paradise")
- "Kibō ni Tsuite" (by NO NAME)
- "Kibō no Kairyū" (by Amakuchi Hime)
- "Kibō Sanmyaku" (by Watarirōka Hashiritai 7)
- "Kibōteki Refrain" (by AKB48)
- "Kidoku Suru" (by Team H)
- "Kikyō" (from AKB48 Team A 4th stage "Tadaima Renaichū")
- "Kimi Dake ni Chu! Chu! Chu!" (by Tentōmu Chu!)
- "Kimi ga Hoshi ni Naru made" (from AKB48 Team K 2nd stage "Seishun Girls")
- "Kimi ga Omotteru yori" (from Team Surprise 1st stage "Jūryoku Sympathy")
- "Kimi ga Oshiete Kureta" (from AKB48 Team A 4th stage "Tadaima Renaichū")
- "Kimi Nara Daijōbu" (by French Kiss)
- "Kimi ni Au tabi Koi o Suru" (from AKB48 Team A 5th stage "Renai Kinshi Jōrei")
- "Kimi ni Tsuite" (by MINT)
- "Kimi ni Yarareta" (by Team B)
- "Kimi no C/W" (from Team Surprise 1st stage "Jūryoku Sympathy")
- "Kimi no Hitomi wa Planetarium" (by Team Kenkyūsei)
- "Kimi no Koi o Shita" (by Minami Minegishi)
- "Kimi no Koto ga Suki Dakara" (by Undergirls)
- "Kimi no Koto ga Suki yaken" (by HKT48)
- "Kimi no Na wa Kibō" (by Nogizaka46)
- "Kimi no Senaka" (by Undergirls)
- "Kimi no Tame ni Boku wa..." (by AKB48 Stage Fighters)
- "Kimi no Uso o Shitteita" (by Beauty Giraffes)
- "Kimi Shika" (by No3b)
- "Kimi to Boku no Kankei" (by Atsuko Maeda, Tomomi Itano)
- "Kimi to Deatte Boku wa Kawatta!" (by NMB48)
- "Kimi wa Boku da" (by Atsuko Maeda)
- "Kimi wa Dōshite?" (by HKT48)
- "Kimi wa Kangaeru" (by Watarirōka Hashiritai 7)
- "Kimi wa Kimagure" (by Team A)
- "Kimi wa Pegasus" (from AKB48 Team K 3rd stage "Nōnai Paradise")
- "Kinjirareta Futari" (from AKB48 Team K 2nd stage "Seishun Girls")
- "Kinmokusei" (from Team Surprise 1st stage "Jūryoku Sympathy")
- "Kinō yori Motto Suki" (by Smiling Lions)
- "Kioku no Dilemma" (from AKB48 Himawarigumi 2nd stage "Yume o Shinaseru Wake ni Ikanai")
- "Kireigoto Demo Iijanaika?" (by HKT48)
- "Kirigirisu Jin" (by No3b)
- "Kiseki wa Ma ni Awanai" (from AKB48 Team K 6th stage "RESET")
- "Kiseki wa Yoru Umareru" (by Minami Takahashi)
- "Kiss datte Hidarikiki" (by SKE48)
- "Kiss made 100 Mile" (by MINT)
- "Kiss made Countdown" (by Team A)
- "Kiss no Ryūsei" (by No3b)
- "Kiss Shite Son Shichatta" (from AKB48 Team B 3rd stage "Pajama Drive")
- "Kiss wa Dame yo" (from AKB48 Team A 1st stage "PARTY ga Hajimaru yo")
- "Kita no Yado kara" (by Misaki Iwasa)
- "Kitagawa Kenji" (by NMB48)
- "Kizashi" (from SKE48 Team KII 3rd stage "Ramune no Nomikata")
- "Kizuitara Kataomoi" (by Nogizaka46)
- "Kobushi no Seigi" (from AKB48 Team B 4th stage "Idol no Yoake")
- "Kodoku Kyōdai" (by Mai Shiraishi, Nanami Hashimoto)
- "Kodoku na Ballerina" (from SKE48 Team KII 3rd stage "Ramune no Nomikata")
- "Kodoku na Hoshizora" (by Team A)
- "Kodoku na Runner" (from SDN48 1st stage "Yūwaku no Garter")
- "Koe ga Kasureru Kurai" (by Akagumi)
- "Koi no Chewing" (by Okashina Sisters)
- "Koi no Keikō Taisaku" (from SKE48 Team S 2nd stage "Te o Tsunaginagara")
- "Koi no Owara" (by Team Z)
- "Koi no Plan" (from AKB48 Team A 2nd stage "Aitakatta")
- "Koi no Shinpaishō" (by Mayu Watanabe)
- "Koi Suru Fortune Cookie" (by AKB48)
- "Koi to ka..." (by AKB48)
- "Koi o Kataru Shijin ni Narenakute" (from SKE48 Team S 3rd stage "Seifuku no Me")
- "Koi yori mo Dream" (by Dasu, Tsuma & Nita)
- "Koike" (from AKB48 Team A 3rd stage "Dareka no Tame ni")
- "Koko de Ippatsu" (by Dasu & Tsuma)
- "Koko Janai Doko ka" (by Erina Ikuta, Rina Ikoma, Minami Hoshino)
- "Koko ni Datte Tenshi wa Iru" (from NMB48 Team N 3rd stage "Koko ni Datte Tenshi wa Iru")
- "Koko ni Iru Riyū" (by Nogizaka46)
- "Koko ni Ita Koto" (by AKB48, SKE48, NMB48, SDN48)
- "Kokoro no Hane" (by Team Dragon from AKB48)
- "Kokoro no Hashi no Sofa" (from AKB48 Team K 6th stage "RESET")
- "Kokoro no Kagi" (by Asuka Kuramochi)
- "Kokoro no Kusuri" (by Nogizaka46)
- "Kokoro no Placard" (by AKB48)
- "Kōmori yo" (by Mai Shiraishi, Himeka Nakamoto, Ami Nōjo, Yumi Wakatsuki)
- "Kondo Koso Ecstasy" (by Next Girls)
- "Konjo" (by Talking Chimpanzees)
- "Kono Mune no Barcode" (from SKE48 Team S 2nd stage "Te o Tsunaginagara")
- "Kono Mune no Melody" (by Atsuko Maeda)
- "Kono Namida o Kimi ni Sasagu" (by NO NAME)
- "Kono Sekai ga Yuki no Naka ni Umoreru Mae ni" (from NMB48 Team N 3rd stage "Koko ni Datte Tenshi wa Iru")
- "Korekara Wonderland" (by AKB48)
- "Korogaru Ishi ni Nare" (from AKB48 Team K 2nd stage "Seishun Girls")
- "Korogatta Kane o Narase!" (by Nogizaka46)
- "Kossetsu Romance" (by Watarirōka Hashiritai 7)
- "Kōtei no Koinu" (from SKE48 Team KII 3rd stage "Ramune no Nomikata")
- "Kuchibiru Furezu..." (by No3b)
- "Kuchibiru ni Be My Baby" (by AKB48)
- "Kuchiutsushi no Chocolate" (from AKB48 Team B 4th stage "Idol no Yoake")
- "Kudokinagara Azabu-Jūban duet with Mino Monta" (by SDN48)
- "Kujira no Basu" (by Honegumi from AKB48)
- "Kuma no Nuigurumi" (from AKB48 Team A 4th stage "Tadaima Renaichū")
- "Kurikuri" (by Undergirls A)
- "Kuroi Tenshi" (from AKB48 Team A 5th stage "Renai Kinshi Jōrei")
- "Kurukurupaa" (from AKB48 Team K 3rd stage "Nōnai Paradise")
- "Kurumi to Dialogue" (by Team A)
- "Kyō made no Koto, Kore kara no Koto" (by SKE48)
- "Kyō made no Meody" (by AKB48)
- "Kyōhansha" (by Team K)
- "Kyusen Kyotei" (by Team N)

== L ==
- "La Brea Ave." (by Atsuko Maeda)
- "Labrador Retriever" (by AKB48)
- "Last Train" (by Yuki Kashiwagi, Aki Takajō)
- "Lay down" (from AKB48 Himawarigumi 1st stage "Boku no Taiyō")
- "Lemon no Toshigoro" (from AKB48 Team K 6th stage "RESET")
- "Let's get "Ato 1cm"" (from AKB48 Himawarigumi 2nd stage "Yume o Shinaseru Wake ni Ikanai")
- "Lie" (by No3b)
- "Lily" (by Team N)
- "Locker Room Boy" (from AKB48 Team B 5th stage "Theater no Megami")
- "Loneliness Club" (by Team B)
- "lose-lose" (by Tomomi Itano)
- "Lost the way" (by DiVA)
- "LOVE CHASE" (from AKB48 Team A 4th stage "Tadaima Renaichū")
- "Love is Over" (by Misaki Iwasa)
- "Love Jump" (by Team B)
- "Love Shugyō" (by Team Kenkyūsei)
- "Love♡Wars" (by Queen & Elizabeth)
- "Lucky Seven" (by AKB48)

== M ==
- "Machi Awasetai" (by Team E)
- "Machikado no Party" (from AKB48 Team K 5th stage "Saka Agari")
- "Madoromi" (by Haruna Kojima)
- "Mae shika Mukanee" (by AKB48)
- "Mae o Muiteru Kimi" (by French Kiss)
- "Mail no Namida" (by Chocolove from AKB48)
- "Maji de Koi Suru 5byo Mae" (by Rino Sashihara)
- "Majijo Teppen Blues" (by AKB48)
- "Majisuka Rock 'n Roll" (by AKB48)
- "Makeoshimi Congratulation" (by SDN48)
- "Mamma, Grazie!" (by Watarirōka Hashiritai 7)
- "Mammoth" (from AKB48 Team K 4th stage "Saishū Bell ga Naru")
- "Manatsu no Christmas Rose" (from AKB48 Team A 5th stage "Renai Kinshi Jōrei")
- "Manatsu no Sounds Good!" (by AKB48)
- "Manazashi Sayonara" (from SKE48 Team KII 3rd stage "Ramune no Nomikata")
- "Mangekyō" (from SKE48 Team S 3rd stage "Seifuku no Me")
- "Mango no.2" (from SKE48 Team S 2nd stage "Te o Tsunaginagara")
- "MARIA" (from AKB48 Team K 3rd stage "Nōnai Paradise")
- "Masaka" (by Tomomi Kasai)
- "Maruhi Dokkiri de Ikō" (by Mayu Watanabe, Natsumi Hirajima, Misaki Iwasa)
- "Matenrō no Kyori" (from AKB48 Team A 6th stage "Mokugekisha")
- "Matsu wa" (by Misaki Iwasa)
- "Mattemashita, Shingakki" (by Akagumi)
- "May" (by Yui Yokoyama)
- "Mayflower" (by Dragon Girls)
- "Mayonaka no Hamigaki" (by Yuki Kashiwagi)
- "Mayu no Tame ni" (by Mayu Watanabe)
- "Me ga Itai Kurai Hareta Sora" (by SKE48 Team Kenkyūsei)
- "Me wo Akete Mama no First Kiss" (by Team 4)
- "Megami wa Doko de Hohoemu?" (from Team Surprise 1st stage "Jūryoku Sympathy")
- "Melon Juice" (by HKT48)
- "Melos no Michi" (from AKB48 Team K 4th stage "Saishū Bell ga Naru")
- "Michi wa Naze Tsuzuku no ka?" (by Aichi Toyota Senbatsu)
- "Mienai Sora wa Itsudemo Aoi" (by Not Yet)
- "Migi e Magare!" (by Akagumi)
- "Migikata" (by Atsuko Maeda)
- "Migi ni Shiteru Ring" (by Team M)
- "Mikata" (by Not Yet)
- "Mikazuki no Senaka" (by NMB48)
- "Min Min Min" (by SDN48)
- "Minasan mo Go Issho ni" (from AKB48 Team B 4th stage "Idol no Yoake")
- "Mine" (by Tomomi Kasai)
- "Miniskirt no Yōsei" (from AKB48 Team A 6th stage "Mokugekisha")
- "Mirai Bashi" (by Yuki Kashiwagi)
- "Mirai ga Me ni Shirimu" (from Team Surprise 2nd stage "Bara no Gishiki")
- "Mirai no Kajitsu" (by AKB48)
- "Mirai no Koibito" (by Watarirōka Hashiritai 7)
- "Mirai no Tobira" (from AKB48 Team A 2nd stage "Aitakatta")
- "Mirai to wa?" (by SKE48)
- "Mitsu no Namida" (by Special Girls)
- "Mitsubachi Girl" (by Team E)
- "Mizu no Nai Pool" (from SKE48 Team S 3rd stage "Seifuku no Me")
- "Mizutama Moyō" (by Rina Ikoma)
- "Mizukiri" (by Akagumi)
- "Mō Hadashi ni Hanarenai" (by Namba Teppōdai Sono Shi)
- "Mō Konna Jikan" (by Porrima from AKB48)
- "Mokugekisha" (from AKB48 Team A 6th stage "Mokugekisha")
- "Monozuki Ichigō" (by No3b)
- "Mori e Ikō" (from AKB48 Himawarigumi 2nd stage "Yume o Shinaseru Wake ni Ikanai")
- "Mosh&Dive" (by AKB48)
- "Moshimo, Te wo Tsunaideitara" (by Not Yet)
- "Moshimo Watashi ga Sora ni Sundeitara" (by Misaki Iwasa)
- "Mōsō Cinderella" (by DIVA)
- "Mōsō Girlfriend" (by NMB48)
- "Moteki no Uta" (by AKB48, Idoling!!! cover)
- "Moto Kare ga Kekkon Suru Toki" (by Not Yet)
- "Mr. Kissman" (from AKB48 Team A 4th stage "Tadaima Renaichū")
- "Muguchi na Lion" (by Nogizaka46)
- "Mujin Eki" (by Misaki Iwasa)
- "Mukashi no Kareshi no Oniichan to Tsukiau to Iu Koto" (by Team KIV)
- "Mushi no Ballad" (from AKB48 Team K 5th stage "Saka Agari")
- "My Shining Stars" (by Haruna Kojima)

== N ==
- "Nada Sōsō" (by Misaki Iwasa)
- "Nagai Hikari" (from AKB48 Team A 5th stage "Renai Kinshi Jōrei")
- "Nageki no Figure" (from AKB48 Team A 2nd stage "Aitakatta")
- "Nagekiss de Uchiotose!" (from AKB48 Team A 3rd stage "Dareka no Tame ni")
- "Nagiichi" (by NMB48)
- "Nagisa no Cherry" (from AKB48 Team A 2nd stage "Aitakatta")
- "Nagori Yuki" (by Misaki Iwasa)
- "Nakama no Uta" (from SKE48 Team S 3rd stage "Seifuku no Me")
- "Nakeru Basho" (by DIVA)
- "Nakinagara Hohoende" (from AKB48 Team K 3rd stage "Nōnai Paradise")
- "Namaiki Lips" (by Nako Yabuki, Miku Tanaka)
- "Namekuji Heart" (by Rina Kondo, Miru Shiroma, Miyuki Watanabe, Fūko Yagura, Keira Yogi, Yūri Ota, Rina Kushiro, Shu Yabushita, Aika Nishimura)
- "Namida ni Shizumu Taiyō" (from Team Surprise 1st stage "Jūryoku Sympathy")
- "Namida no Sei ja Nai" (by AKB48)
- "Namida no Shinkokyū" (from AKB48 Team A 5th stage "Renai Kinshi Jōrei")
- "Namida no Shōnan" (from AKB48 Team A 2nd stage "Aitakatta")
- "Namida no Sea-Saw Game" (by Undergirls)
- "Namida mada Kanashimi datta Koro" (by Under Members)
- "Namida Surprise!" (by AKB48)
- "Namida Uri no Shōjo" (by AKB48)
- "Naminori Kakigōri" (by Not Yet)
- "Nandeyanen, Idol" (by NMB48)
- "Nando mo Nerae!" (from NMB48 Team N 3rd stage "Koko ni Datte Tenshi wa Iru")
- "Nandome no Aozora ka?" (by Nogizaka46)
- "Nantai Renai Kuragekko" (by Mayu Watanabe)
- "Nani mo Dekizu ni Soba ni Iru" (by Nogizaka46)
- "Nante Bohemian" (by Undergirls)
- "Nante Ginga wa Akarui no Darō" (by Akagumi)
- "Nante Suteki na Ahiru no Boat" (by Mayu Watanabe, Aika Ōta, Mika Komori)
- "Nante Suteki na Sekai ni Umareta no Darō" (from AKB48 Team A 4th stage "Tadaima Renaichū")
- "Natsu ga Icchatta" (from AKB48 Team A 3rd stage "Dareka no Tame ni")
- "Natsu no Free & Easy" (by Nogizaka46)
- "Natsu no Mae" (by Team KIV)
- "Natsu no Saiminjutsu" (by Team M)
- "Nattō Angels" (by Nattō Angel)
- "Nattō Man" (by Nattō Angel Z)
- "Naze no Rakugaki" (by Minami Hoshino, Miona Hori, Asuka Saito)
- "Neko Damashi" (by Watarirōka Hashiritai 7)
- "Neko no Shippo ga Pin to Tatteru yō ni" (by Team S)
- "Nemuku Naru made Hitsuji wa Detekonai" (by Undergirls)
- "Never!" (from SDN48 1st stage "Yūwaku no Garter")
- "NEW SHIP" (by Special Girls A)
- "NEXT HEAVEN" (by EYES)
- "Nice to meet you!" (from SKE48 Team KII 3rd stage "Ramune no Nomikata")
- "Niji no Ressha" (by NO NAME)
- "Ningen to Iu Gakki" (by Nogizaka46)
- "Ningyo no Vacance" (by Aki Takajo, Moeno Nito, Yui Yokoyama, Tomomi Kasai, Rie Kitahara, Amina Sato, Yuka Maeda)
- "NMB48" (from NMB48 Team BII 1st stage "Aitakatta")
- "Nō Kan" (by Team B)
- "No Way Out" (by DiVA)
- "Noel no Yoru" (by AKB48)
- "Nogizaka no Uta" (by Nogizaka46)
- "Nōnai Paradise" (from AKB48 Team K 3rd stage "Nōnai Paradise")
- "Nusumareta Kuchibiru" (by Undergirls)

== O ==
- "Oboete Kudasai" (by HKT48 Team Kenkyūsei)
- "Ōgoe Diamond" (by AKB48)
- "Ōgon Center" (by Team Kenkyūsei)
- "Oh My God!" (by NMB48)
- "Oide Shampoo" (by Nogizaka46)
- "Oikake Shadow" (by Akagumi)
- "Ōkami ni Kuchibue o" (by Under Members)
- "Ōkami to Pride" (from SKE48 Team S 3rd stage "Seifuku no Me")
- "Okera" (from AKB48 Team K 6th stage "RESET")
- "Okey Dokey" (by SKE48)
- "Okuba" (by Shirogumi)
- "Omatase Set List" (from SKE48 Team KII 3rd stage "Ramune no Nomikata")
- "Omawase Kōsen" (by Akagumi)
- "Omo Naki Sono Koe" (by NO NAME)
- "Omoidasenai Hana" (by French Kiss)
- "Omoidasu Tabi ni Tsuraku Naru" (from Team Surprise 1st stage "Jūryoku Sympathy")
- "Omoide ga Tōi Hodo" (by Mayu Watanabe, Aika Ōta, Ayaka Kikuchi)
- "Omoide Ijō" (from SKE48 Team S 3rd stage "Seifuku no Me")
- "Omoide no Hotondo" (by Minami Takahashi, Atsuko Maeda)
- "Onedari Champagne" (by Undergirls A)
- "Onegai Valentine" (by HKT48)
- "Onew no Uwabaki" (from NMB48 Team N 3rd stage "Koko ni Datte Tenshi wa Iru")
- "Only Today" (by AKB48)
- "Onna no Ko no Dairokkan" (from SKE48 Team S 3rd stage "Seifuku no Me")
- "Oshibe to Meshibe to Yoru no Chōchō" (from AKB48 Team K 4th stage "Saishū Bell ga Naru")
- "Oshiete Mommy" (by Next Girls)
- "Oteagi Lullaby" (from Team Surprise 1st stage "Jūryoku Sympathy")
- "Oto ga Denai Guitar" (by Nogizaka46)
- "Otona e no Michi" (by Team Kenkyūsei)
- "Overtake" (by Team A)
- "Owaranai Encore" (by SDN48)

== P ==
- "Pajama Drive" (from AKB48 Team B 3rd stage "Pajama Drive")
- "Papa wa Kirai" (by Akagumi)
- "Pareo wa Emerald" (by SKE48)
- "PARTY ga Hajimaru yo" (from AKB48 Team A 1st stage "PARTY ga Hajimaru yo")
- "Party is Over" (by AKB48)
- "Peak" (by NMB48)
- "Pedicure Day" (by No3b)
- "Perapera Perao" (by Not Yet)
- "Pinocchio Gun" (from SKE48 Team S 3rd stage "Seifuku no Me")
- "Pioneer" (from AKB48 Team A 6th stage "Mokugekisha")
- "Plastic no Kuchibiru" (by Mariko Shinoda)
- "Pokkari" (by French Kiss)
- "Ponkotsu Blues" (by AKB48)
- "Ponytail to Shushu" (by AKB48)
- "Prom no Koibito" (by Shirogumi)
- "Psychokinesis no Kanosei" (by Nogizaka46)

== R ==
- "Radio Name" (from NMB48 Team N 3rd stage "Koko ni Datte Tenshi wa Iru")
- "Rainy Day" (by French Kiss)
- "Rakuen no Kaidan" (from SKE48 Team S 3rd stage "Seifuku no Me")
- "Ramune no Nomikata" (from SKE48 Team KII 3rd stage "Ramune no Nomikata")
- "Rashikunai" (by NMB48)
- "Reborn" (by Team Surprise)
- "Relax!" (by No3b)
- "Renai Athlete" (by Watarirōka Hashiritai)
- "Renai Circus" (by Team B)
- "Renai Heavy-kyū Champion" (by Mayu Watanabe, Haruka Nakagawa, Ayaka Kikuchi, Misaki Iwasa)
- "Renai Higaitodoke" (by Akagumi)
- "Renai Kinshi Jōrei" (from AKB48 Team A 5th stage "Renai Kinshi Jōrei")
- "Renai no Speed" (by NMB Seven)
- "Renai Sōsenkyo" (by YM7)
- "RESET" (from AKB48 Team K 6th stage "RESET")
- "Return Match" (from AKB48 Team K 4th stage "Saishū Bell ga Naru")
- "Ribbon Nante Niawanai" (from NMB48 Team N 3rd stage "Koko ni Datte Tenshi wa Iru")
- "Rider" (from AKB48 Team A 3rd stage "Dareka no Tame ni")
- "Rifujin Ball" (by Undergirls)
- "Rikoteki na Renai" (by Minami Takahashi)
- "Rinjin wa Kizutsukanai" (by Team A)
- "Rio no Kakumei" (from AKB48 Team A 2nd stage "Aitakatta")
- "RIVER" (by AKB48)
- "Rock da yo, Jinsei wa..." (from AKB48 Himawarigumi 2nd stage "Yume o Shinaseru Wake ni Ikanai")
- "Romance, Irane" (by AKB48)
- "Romance Kakurenbo" (from AKB48 Team B 5th stage "Theater no Megami")
- "Romance Kenjū" (by Team B)
- "Romance no Start" (by Nogizaka46)
- "Romance Privacy" (by French Kiss)
- "Romance Rocket" (from SKE48 Team S 2nd stage "Te o Tsunaginagara")
- "Romantic Ikayaki" (by Nogizaka46)
- "Rope no Yūjō" (from SKE48 Team S 2nd stage "Te o Tsunaginagara")
- "Ruby" (by Team A)
- "RUN RUN RUN" (from AKB48 Himawarigumi 1st stage "Boku no Taiyō")

== S ==
- "S-ko to Usohakkenki" (by Team KII)
- "Sabita Rock" (by Minami Takahashi)
- "Saboten to Gold Rush" (from AKB48 Team A 6th stage "Mokugekisha")
- "Sado e Wataru" (by Undergirls B)
- "Saigo no Catharsis" (by Shirogumi)
- "Saigo no Door" (by AKB48)
- "Saigo no Seifuku" (by AKB48)
- "Sailor Zombie" (by AKB48)
- "Saigo ni Ice Milk o Nonda no wa Itsu Darō?" (from Team Surprise 2nd stage "Bara no Gishiki")
- "Saisho no Mail" (by French Kiss)
- "Saishū Bell ga Naru" (from AKB48 Team K 4th stage "Saishū Bell ga Naru")
- "Saka Agari" (from AKB48 Team K 5th stage "Saka Agari")
- "Sakura, Minnade Tabeta" (by HKT48)
- "Sakura no Hanabira (Maeda Atsuko solo ver.)" (by Atsuko Maeda)
- "Sakura no Hanabiratachi" (by AKB48)
- "Sakura no Hanabiratachi 2008" (by AKB48)
- "Sakura no Ki ni Narō" (by AKB48)
- "Sakura no Shiori" (by AKB48)
- "Sakurairo no Sora no Shita de" (by AKB48)
- "Sakuranbo to Kodoku" (by Team Kenkyūsei)
- "Saru no Cymbol" (by Mayu Watanabe, Haruka Nakagawa, Mika Komori)
- "Sasae" (from AKB48 Team K 4th stage "Saishū Bell ga Naru")
- "Sansei Kawaii!" (by SKE48)
- "Sasameyuki Regret" (by Team K)
- "Sasayaka na Boku no Teikō" (by Not Yet)
- "Saturday Night Party" (from SDN48 1st stage "Yūwaku no Garter")
- "Sayanee" (by Undergirls)
- "Sayonara Crawl" (by AKB48)
- "Sayonara Kinō no Jibun" (by Team KII)
- "Sayonara ni Kizuite" (by Minami Minegishi)
- "Sayonara no Kanashibari" (from AKB48 Team B 5th stage "Theater no Megami")
- "Scandalous ni Ikō" (by Yuko Oshima, Haruna Kojima)
- "Scrap & Build" (by Team K)
- ""Seito Techo no Shashin wa Ki ni Haittenai" no Hoshoku" (by NMB48)
- "Sekai de Ichiban Kodoku na Lover" (by Nogizaka46)
- "Sekai no Namida" (by French Kiss)
- "Seifuku ga Jama o Suru" (by AKB48)
- "Seifuku no Bambi" (by HKT48)
- "Seifuku no Hane" (by Team 8)
- "Seifuku no Mannequin" (by Nogizaka46)
- "Seifuku no Me" (from SKE48 Team S 3rd stage "Seifuku no Me")
- "Seifuku Resistance" (from AKB48 Team K 6th stage "RESET")
- "Seigi no Mikata ja Nai Hero" (by Team B)
- "Seijun Philosophy" (by Team 4)
- "Seikaku ga Warui Onna no Ko" (by Future Girls)
- "Seishun Curry Rice" (by Team E)
- "Seishun Girls" (from AKB48 Team K 2nd stage "Seishun Girls")
- "Seishun no Flag" (by Watarirōka Hashiritai)
- "Seishun no Komorebi" (by No3b)
- "Seishun no Mizushibuki" (by Boat Pier Senbatsu)
- "Seishun wa Hazukashii" (by Akagumi)
- "Seishun no Inazuma" (from AKB48 Himawarigumi 2nd stage "Yume o Shinaseru Wake ni Ikanai")
- "Seishun no Laptime" (by NMB48)
- "Seishun to Kizukanai Mama" (by AKB48)
- "Sekai no Kaze o Bokura wa Ukete" (by Not Yet)
- "Sekaijyū no Ame" (by Team Dragon from AKB48)
- "Sekkachi na Katatsumuri" (by Nogizaka46)
- "Sekkaku" (by No3b)
- "Senaka kara Dakishimete" (from AKB48 Team A 2nd stage "Aitakatta")
- "Senpūki" (by Nogizaka46)
- "Sentakumonotachi" (from AKB48 Team K 6th stage "RESET")
- "Seto no Hanayome" (by Misaki Iwasa)
- "Seventeen" (by AKB48)
- "Shakiism" (by Nogizaka46)
- "Shaku ga Hoshii" (by Renai Ujōshō-dan)
- "Shalala na Calendar" (by Team A)
- "Shamu Neko" (from AKB48 Team K 4th stage "Saishū Bell ga Naru")
- "Shekarashika!" (by HKT48)
- "Shibuya Blues" (by Mai Shiraishi, Kazumi Takayama)
- "Shikatte yo, Darling" (by Team KII)
- "Shikaze no Shōtaijō" (from AKB48 Team B 5th stage "Theater no Megami")
- "Shimai Donburi" (by Mayu Watanabe, Kazumi Urano)
- "Shinkirō" (from AKB48 Team A 3rd stage "Dareka no Tame ni")
- "Shiro Nuki Heart Mark" (by Queen & Elizabeth)
- "Shiroi Kumo ni Notte" (by Nogizaka46)
- "Shiroi Shirt" (from AKB48 Team B 3rd stage "Pajama Drive")
- "Shiroi Tullip" (by Watarirōka Hashiritai)
- "Shirokuro" (by Tomomi Itano)
- "Shitsuren Dōmei" (from Team Surprise 2nd stage "Bara no Gishiki")
- "Shōjo A" (by Tomomi Itano)
- "Shōjo wa Manatsu ni Nani o Suru?" (by Undergirls A)
- "Shōjotachi yo" (by AKB48)
- "Shōnen yo Uso o Tsuke!" (by Watarirōka Hashiritai 7)
- "Shonichi" (from AKB48 Team B 3rd stage "Pajama Drive")
- "Shortcake" (by Yuki Kashiwagi)
- "Show fight!" (by Future Girls)
- "Shower no Ato Dakara" (by Yuki Kashiwagi, Haruna Kojima, Rena Matsui)
- "Shūmatsu Not Yet" (by Not Yet)
- "Sister" (by Tomomi Itano)
- "SKE48" (from SKE48 Team S 1st stage "Party ga Hajimaru yo")
- "Skirt, Hirari" (by AKB48)
- "Smile Kamikakushi" (by Tentōmu Chu!)
- "So Long!" (by AKB48)
- "So-Mi-So-Mi-La-Si-La" (by Watarirōka Hashiritai 7)
- "Soba ni Isasete" (by SKE48)
- "Sobakasu no Kiss" (from AKB48 Team B 4th stage "Idol no Yoake")
- "Soft Cream Kiss" (by Rino Sashihara)
- "Sōgen no Kiseki" (from AKB48 Team K 3rd stage "Nōnai Paradise")
- "Soko de Inu no Unchi Funjau kane?" (by Team B)
- "Soko de Nani o Kangaeru ka?" (by HKT48)
- "Sono Ase wa Uso o Tsukanai" (from AKB48 Team K 5th stage "Saka Agari")
- "Sono Saki ni Kimi ga Ita" (by SKE48 Team Kenkyūsei)
- "Sono Saki no Deguchi" (by Nogizaka46)
- "Sonna Baka na..." (by Nogizaka46)
- "Sonna Konna Wake de" (from AKB48 Himawarigumi 1st stage "Boku no Taiyō")
- "Sono Mama de" (from Team Surprise 1st stage "Jūryoku Sympathy")
- "Sonzai Shitenai Mono" (by Akagumi)
- "Sore o Seishun to Yobu Hi" (by Tabidachi Sotsugyōgumi)
- "Soredemo Nakanai" (by Yuki Kashiwagi)
- "Soredemo Suki Da yo" (by Rino Sashihara)
- "Sotsugyōshiki no Wasuremono" (by Shirogumi)
- "Sōzō no Shinjin" (by NMB48 Team Kenkyūsei)
- "Sqall no Aida ni" (from AKB48 Team A 5th stage "Renai Kinshi Jōrei")
- "Stand Up" (from AKB48 Team K 4th stage "Saishū Bell ga Naru")
- "Star ni Nante Naritakunai" (by Team BII)
- "Stargazer" (by Yuka Masuda)
- "Stay by my side" (by Tomomi Itano)
- "Still" (by Takahashi Minami)
- "Stoic na Bigaku" (by Miori Ichikawa, Mina Oba, Kanon Kimoto, Sakura Miyawaki, Nako Yabuki, Shu Yabushita, Mayu Watanabe)
- "Sugar Rush" (by AKB48)
- "Suifu wa Arashi ni Yume wo Miru" (from AKB48 Team B 3rd stage "Pajama Drive")
- "Suika Baby" (by Not Yet)
- "Suitei Marmalade" (by Future Girls)
- "Suiyōbi no Alice" (from Team Surprise 1st stage "Jūryoku Sympathy")
- "Suki! Suki! Skip!" (by HKT48)
- "Suki Suki Suki" (from AKB48 Team B 5th stage "Theater no Megami")
- "Suki to Ieba Yokatta" (from AKB48 Team B 4th stage "Idol no Yoake")
- "Sukoshi Nigai Jinsei Sōdan" (from NMB48 Team N 3rd stage "Koko ni Datte Tenshi wa Iru")
- "Sunahama de Pistol" (by Namba Teppōdai Sono Ichi)
- "Sunao ni Naritai" (by Not Yet)
- "Sunday drive" (by Atsuko Maeda)
- "Sunenagara, Ame" (by Selection 8)
- "Sunglasses to Uchiakebanashi" (by NMB48 Team Kenkyūsei)
- "Surrender" (by DIVA)
- "Suteki na Sankaku Kankei" (from Team Surprise 1st stage "Jūryoku Sympathy")
- "Suzukake no Ki no Michi de "Kimi no Hohoemi o Yume ni Miru" to Itte Shimattara Bokutachi no Kankei wa Dō Kawatte Shimau no ka, Bokunari ni Nannichi ka Kangaeta Ue de no Yaya Kihazukashii Ketsuron no Yō na Mono" (by AKB48)
- "Sweet & Bitter" (by Selection 6)
- "Switch" (from AKB48 Team A 5th stage "Renai Kinshi Jōrei")

== T ==
- "Tabidachi no Toki" (from Team Surprise 1st stage "Jūryoku Sympathy")
- "Tadaima Renaichū" (from AKB48 Team A 4th stage "Tadaima Renaichū")
- "Taiikukan de Chōshoku o" (by Shirogumi)
- "Takane no Ringo" (by NMB48)
- "Takeuchi Senpai" (from AKB48 Himawarigumi 1st stage "Boku no Taiyō")
- "Tane" (by No3b)
- "Taningyōgi na Sunset Beach" (by Aika Ota, Akari Suda, Suzuran Yamauchi, Miyuki Watanabe)
- "Tanjōbi no Yoru" (from AKB48 Team A 3rd stage "Dareka no Tame ni")
- "Tanpopo no Kesshin" (from AKB48 Team B 4th stage "Idol no Yoake")
- "Tatami" (by Atsuko Maeda)
- "Te o Tsunaginagara" (from SKE48 Team S 2nd stage "Te o Tsunaginagara")
- "Team B Oshi" (from AKB48 Team B 5th stage "Theater no Megami")
- "Team Zaka" (by Team 4)
- "Tegami no Koto" (from SKE48 Team S 3rd stage "Seifuku no Me")
- "Temodemo no Namida" (from AKB48 Team B 3rd stage "Pajama Drive")
- "Tender days" (by Nogizaka46)
- "Tengoku no Door wa Sankaime no Bell de Aku" (by Undergirls A)
- "Tengoku Yarō" (from AKB48 Team B 4th stage "Idol no Yoake")
- "Tenmonbu no Jijō" (by HKT48)
- "Tenohira" (by Watarirōka Hashiritai)
- "Tenohira" (from AKB48 Team K 5th stage "Saka Agari")
- "Tenshi no Shippo" (from AKB48 Team B 3rd stage "Pajama Drive")
- "Teppen Tottande!" (by NMB48)
- "Thank you" (by Tomomi Itano)
- "Theater no Megami" (from AKB48 Team B 5th stage "Theater no Megami")
- "Theater Pirates" (from AKB48 Team K 3rd stage "Nōnai Paradise")
- "Through The Night" (by Selection 8)
- "Tiny T-shirt" (by Team B)
- "To be continued" (from AKB48 Team K 5th stage "Saka Agari")
- "Tobenai Agehachō" (by Undergirls)
- "Todokanasōde Todokumono" (by NMB48)
- "Tōhikō" (from SDN48 1st stage "Yūwaku no Garter")
- "Tōi Machi e" (by Rino Sashihara)
- "Toiki no Method" (by Nogizaka46)
- "Toki no Nagareni Miwo Makase" (by Misaki Iwasa)
- "Toki wa Katari Hajimeru" (by Undergirls)
- "Tokimeki Antique" (from Team Surprise 2nd stage "Bara no Gishiki")
- "Tokimeki no Ashiato" (by Shirogumi)
- "Tōku ni Ite mo" (from SKE48 Team S 2nd stage "Te o Tsunaginagara")
- "Tōmawari" (by Atsuko Maeda)
- "Tōmawari no Aijō" (by Nogizaka46)
- "Tomo yo" (from AKB48 Team K 3rd stage "Nōnai Paradise")
- "Tomo yo Yoake ni Machiawaseyō" (by Sukeban Girls)
- "Tomodachi" (by Nana Yamada, Sayaka Yamamoto)
- "Tomodachi no Mama de" (by Selection 10)
- "Tomonoura Bojō" (by Misaki Iwasa)
- "Tonari no Banana" (from AKB48 Himawarigumi 2nd stage "Yume o Shinaseru Wake ni Ikanai")
- "Tori wa Aoi Sora no Hate wo Shiranai" (by Akagumi)
- "Totteoki Christmas" (by AKB48)
- "Tsubasa o Kudasai" (by Misaki Iwasa)
- "Tsubomitachi" (by Team 4+Kenkyūsei)
- "Tsugaru Kaikyo Fuyugeshiki" (by Misaki Iwasa)
- "Tsugi no Pierce" (by Not Yet)
- "Tsugi no Season" (by Undergirls)
- "Tsugunai" (by Misaki Iwasa)
- "Tsuki no Inori" (by Tomomi Itano)
- "Tsuki no Katachi" (from AKB48 Team A 3rd stage "Dareka no Tame ni")
- "Tsuki no Ōkisa" (by Nogizaka46)
- "Tsuki no Uragawa" (by DiVA)
- "Tsukimisō" (from AKB48 Team A 3rd stage "Dareka no Tame ni")
- "Tsumiki no Jikan" (by SKE48)
- "Tsundere!" (from AKB48 Team A 5th stage "Renai Kinshi Jōrei")
- "Tsupparu Riyū" (by Sukeban Girls)
- "Tsuyogari Tokei" (by SKE48)
- "Tsuyoi Hana" (by Team Kenkyūsei)
- "Tsuyoki Mono yo" (by SKE48)
- "Tsuyosa to Yowasa no Aida de" (by AKB48)
- "TUNNEL" (by Tomomi Itano)
- "Two Roses" (by Kinect)
- "Two Years Later" (from AKB48 Team B 3rd stage "Pajama Drive")

== U ==
- "Ude o Kunde" (from AKB48 Team A 6th stage "Mokugekisha")
- "Ue kara Mariko" (by AKB48)
- "Ue kara Natsuko" (by Undergirls B)
- "Uhho Uhhoho" (from AKB48 Team K 6th stage "RESET")
- "Umareta Mama de" (by Under Members)
- "Umi o Watare!" (from AKB48 Team K 5th stage "Saka Agari")
- "Uminari yo" (by Not Yet)
- "Ushinaitakunai kara" (by Nogizaka46)
- "Uso desho? ~Nanaboshi Ga Hama no Nanafushigi~" (by GIRLS・ING)
- "Uso no Tenbin" (by NMB Seven)
- "Usotsuki no Dachō" (from SKE48 Team KII 3rd stage "Ramune no Nomikata")
- "Utaitai" (by Katareagumi)
- "Utaouyo, Bokutachi no Kōka" (by Selection 8)
- "Utsukushii Inazuma" (by SKE48)
- "Utsukushiki Mono" (from AKB48 Team A 6th stage "Mokugekisha")
- "UZA" (by AKB48)

== V ==
- "Valentine Kiss" (by Watarirōka Hashiritai 7)
- "Vamos" (by Undergirls Baragumi)
- "Vampire Keikaku" (from SDN48 1st stage "Yūwaku no Garter")
- "Vermeer no Tegami" (by Not Yet)
- "Virgin Love" (by AKB48)
- "Virginity" (by NMB48)
- "Viva! Hurricane" (by AKB48)

== W ==
- "Wagamama Collection" (by Aika Ota, Ami Maeda, Mika Komori, Sumire Satō, Mayu Watanabe, Jurina Matsui)
- "Wagamama na Nagareboshi" (from AKB48 Team K 5th stage "Saka Agari")
- "Waiting Room" (by Undergirls)
- "Wakage no Italian" (by Watarirōka Hashiritai)
- "Warau ga Ii" (by Not Yet)
- "Warning" (from AKB48 Team A 3rd stage "Dareka no Tame ni")
- "Warukii" (by Miyuki Watanabe)
- "Wasshoi B!" (from AKB48 Team B 3rd stage "Pajama Drive")
- "Watashi, Okiru" (by Nogizaka46)
- "Watashi Leaf" (by Anna Iriyama, Rena Kato, Rina Kawaei, Jurina Matsui)
- "Watashi no Hikari" (by Tomomi Kasai)
- "Watashi no Kareshi wa Zenigata Heiji" (by Team Z)
- "Watashi no Tame ni, Dareka no Tame ni" (by Misa Eto, Mahiro Kawamura, Reika Sakurai, Mai Shiraishi, Kazumi Takayama)
- "Watashi wa Blueberry Pie" (by Blueberry Pie)
- "Watashi wa Watashi" (by Minami Minegishi)
- "Watashitachi no Reason" (by AKB48)
- "Waves" (by Chocolove from AKB48)
- "Wink wa 3-kai" (by HKT48)
- "With My Soul" (by Team M)
- "White Day ni wa..." (from AKB48 Team K 6th stage "RESET")
- "Wimbledon e Tsureteitte" (from SKE48 Team S 2nd stage "Te o Tsunaginagara")
- "Winning Ball" (from SKE48 Team KII 3rd stage "Ramune no Nomikata")
- "Wow War Tonight ~Toki ni wa Okose yo Movement~" (by DIVA)

== Y ==
- "Yabanna Softcream" (by Akagumi)
- "Yabureta Hane" (by Minami Takahashi)
- "Yaruki Hanabi" (by Watarirōka Hashiritai)
- "Yasashisa nara Ma ni Atteru" (by Nogizaka46)
- "Yaritagariya-san" (by Undergirls Team G)
- "Yakusoku yo" (from AKB48 Team K 2nd stage "Seishun Girls")
- "Yama e Ikō" (by Namba Teppōdai Sono Go)
- "Yankee Soul" (by AKB48)
- "Yasai Sisters" (by AKB48)
- "Yasai Uranai" (by AKB48)
- "Yasashiku Sasete" (by Mayu Watanabe)
- "Yasashiza no Chizu" (by AKB48)
- "Yasashisa to wa" (by Nogizaka46)
- "Yeah! Meccha Holiday" (by Rino Sashihara)
- "Yoake made" (by Atsuko Maeda)
- "Yobisute Fantasy" (by Team B)
- "Yōchien no Sensei" (from Team Surprise 2nd stage "Bara no Gishiki")
- "Yokaze no Shiwaza" (from AKB48 Team B 5th stage "Theater no Megami")
- "Yokosuka Curve" (from AKB48 Team B 4th stage "Idol no Yoake")
- "You should know it..." (by DIVA)
- "Yoyakushita Christmas" (by AKB48)
- "Yubi Bōenkyo" (by Nogizaka46)
- "Yūdachi no Mae" (by SKE48 Team Kenkyūsei)
- "Yūhi Marie" (by Team K)
- "Yūhi o Miteiru ka?" (by AKB48)
- "Yūhi no Ijiwaru" (by Mayu Watanabe)
- "Yūki no Hammer" (from AKB48 Team B 5th stage "Theater no Megami")
- "Yume o Miru Nara" (from Team Surprise 2nd stage "Bara no Gishiki")
- "Yume o Shinaseru Wake ni Ikanai" (from AKB48 Himawarigumi 2nd stage "Yume o Shinaseru Wake ni Ikanai")
- "Yume no Dead Body" (from NMB48 Team N 3rd stage "Koko ni Datte Tenshi wa Iru")
- "Yume no Kane" (from AKB48 Team K 6th stage "RESET")
- "Yume no Kawa" (by AKB48)
- "Yume wa Nandomo Umarekawaru" (by NO NAME)
- "Yuru Yuru de DE-O! 2007 Crayon Friends Version" (by Crayon Friends from AKB48)
- "Yūwaku no Garter" (from SDN48 1st stage "Yūwaku no Garter")

== Z ==
- "Zakuro no Jitsuwa Yūtsu ga Nantsubu Tsumatte Iru?" (by Akagumi)
- "Zannen Shōjo" (from AKB48 Team B 4th stage "Idol no Yoake")
- "Zenigata Heiji" (by Team Z)
- "Zenjin Mitō" (from AKB48 Team A 6th stage "Mokugekisha")
- "Zero-sum Taiyō" (by Team K)
- "Zetsumetsu Kurokami Shōjo" (by NMB48)
- "Zipper" (from NMB48 Team N 3rd stage "Koko ni Datte Tenshi wa Iru")
- "Zutto mae kara" (by French Kiss)
- "Zutto Zutto" (from AKB48 Team A 6th stage "Mokugekisha")
- "Zutto Zutto Saki no Kyō" (by Selection 18)
