= Hikari Kajiwara =

Japanese actress

- Born: 21 December 1992 (age 32); Tokyo, Japan
- Occupation: Actress
- Years active: 2000–present

Hikari Kajiwara (梶原 ひかり, Kajiwara Hikari; born 21 December 1992) is a Japanese actress.

== Early life ==
Hikari Kajiwara was born in Tokyo on 21 December 1992.

== Career ==
Kajiwara debuted as a child actress in the stage play Fall Guy in 2000. She was represented by Horipro Improvement Academy when she was a child actress. She has appeared in films such as the Kamen Rider series, Cold Fish, and Kuro. She signed with the agency Hirata Office in 2012.

== Personal life ==
Kajiwara enjoys playing the koto and exercising.

== Filmography ==
=== Film ===
Year	Title	Role	Notes
2004	Kamen Rider Blade: Missing Ace	Amane Kurihara (young)	
2006	True Tears	Io Sakuragawa	Direct-to-video
2008	Park and Love Hotel	Mika	
2010	Aete yokatta	Alisa	
2011	Cold Fish	Mitsuko Syamoto	
2011	Dōbutsu no Kari-kata		Agency for Cultural Affairs promo
2011	Shiroi Ie		Made by the Japan Institute of the Moving Image
2011	If: Kyō, Koi o hajimemasu	Misa	Short film for the song "If" by French Kiss
2012	Audrey	Eri Ishizuka	
2012	Kamen Rider Fourze the Movie: Space, Here We Come!	Ritsuko Usaka	
2012	Land of Hope	Yoko	
2013	Judas		
2013	Jinrō Game	Naoko Inose	
2014	Kuro	Kizashi	
2015	Shinjuku Swan		
2017	Shinjuku Swan II		
2017	Tremble All You Want		

=== Television ===
Year	Title	Role	Notes
2001	Heart		Episode 5
2001	Mama masshigura! 2		Episode 14
2002	Chiharu Saotome no Tenjō Hōkoku-sho 12		Episode 14
2003	Korogashi o Gin	Yuki	
2004	Kamen Rider Blade	Amane Kurihara	
2005	The Queen's Classroom	Erika Sato	
2007	Enka no Joō		Final episode
2007	Sexy Voice and Robo	Mu-chan	
2008	Battery	Haruna Ito	
2008	Natsukoi	Sawako Hirata	
2008	Gakkō ja Oshierarenai!	Erika	Episode 9
2008	Love Letter	Atsuko Namiki	Episodes 11 to 14
2009	Kamen Rider W	Young Girl	Episode 12
2010	Hidarime Tantei Eye		Episode 7 to finale
2010	Onna Taxi Driver no Jiken Nisshi 5	Saori	
2011	Hideo Yokoyama Suspense: Hikitsugi		
2011	Kōkōsei Restaurant	Yuko Toba	
2011	Kamen Rider Fourze	Ritsuko Usaka / Altar Zodiarts	4 episodes
2011	Yonimo Kimyōna Monogatari 2011-nen Aki no Tokubetsu-hen: Ijime rare kko	Moe Hiratsuka	
2012	Mikeneko Homes no Suiri	Makiko Hamano	2 episodes
2012	Sōmatō Kabushikigaisha	Yuko Tachibana	Episode 1
2012	Sangaku Keiji	Hiroko Michihara	
2012	Aibō Season 11	Kyoko Nagao	2 episodes
2012	Shūchakueki no Ushio Keiji Vs Jiken Kisha Saeko 12	Narumi Soejima	
2012	Kakarichō Aoshima Shunsaku 2: Jiken wa matamata Torishirabe-shitsu de Okite iru!	Sanae Tsushima	Web series
2013	35-sai no Koukousei		Episode 4
2013	Limit	Saeko	Episode 2
2015	Mare	Ami Okano	
2016	Iyana Onna	Marina	Episode 4
2016	Suizokukan Girl	Kanade Tada	
2019	Kamen Rider Zi-O	Amane Kurihara	2 episodes

=== Stage ===
Year	Title	Role
2000	Kamata Kōshinkyoku Kanketsu-hen: Gin-chan ga Iku	
2001	Kazushige Nagashima Satsujin Jiken	
2011	Bungaku Seinen	

=== Radio ===
Year	Title	Role	Notes
2008	Seishun Adventure: Bird Cage Ichiokuen o Tsukai kire!	Kumi	NHK FM
2015	Seishun Adventure: Ugly Girl	Ivan	NHK FM

=== Commercial ===
Year	Title
2011	Kagome Yasai Seikatsu
2011	Nippon Telegraph and Telephone East Hikari i Frame 2
