= Sekai no Chūshin wa Osaka ya: Namba Jichiku =

Sekai no Chuushin wa Osaka ya (Namba Jichiku)
- Cover art for the album's Type N edition

Studio album by NMB48
- Released: August 13, 2014
- Genre: J-pop
- Label: laugh out loud/R&C

NMB48 chronology
Teppen Tottande! (2013)	''Sekai no Chuushin wa Osaka ya (Namba Jichiku)'' (2014)	Namba Ai ~Ima, Omou Koto~

Sekai no Chuushin wa Osaka ya ~Namba Jichiku~ (世界の中心は大阪や 〜なんば自治区〜) ("Center Of The World Is Osaka : Namba Autonomous Region") is the second album by NMB48. It was released on August 13, 2014. It debuted at number one on the weekly Oricon Albums Chart and, as of August 25 (issue date), it has sold 325,249 copies.

== Track listings ==
All lyrics written by Yasushi Akimoto.

=== Type-N ===
CD
No.	Title	Artist(s)	Length
1.	"Ibisa Girl" (イビサガール)		4:08
2.	"Bokura no Eureka" (僕らのユリイカ)		4:10
3.	"Kamonegikkusu" (カモネギックス)		4:17
4.	"Takane no Ringo" (高嶺の林檎)		4:38
5.	"Seito Techō no Shashin wa Ki ni Itte Inai no Hōsoku" ("生徒手帳の写真は気に入っていない"の法則)		4:58
6.	"Densha o Oriru" (電車を降りる)	Team N	5:05
7.	"Okuba" (奥歯)	Shirogumi	5:39
8.	"Doshaburi no Seishun no Naka de" (どしゃぶりの青春の中で)	Shirogumi	4:31
9.	"Prom no Koibito" (プロムの恋人)	Shirogumi	4:36
10.	"Dakishimetai Kedo" (抱きしめたいけど)	Sayaka Yamamoto	4:18
11.	"Isshūkan, Zenbu ga Getsuyōbi Nara Iinoni..." (一週間、全部が月曜日ならいいのに…)		4:28
12.	"Sunglass to Uchiake Banashi" (サングラスと打ち明け話)		4:36
13.	"Jikan wa Katari Hajimeru" (時間は語り始める)		3:56
14.	"Kamonegikkusu (Remo-Con REMIX)" (カモネギックス (Remo-Con REMIX))		5:10
15.	"Kimi to Deatte Boku wa Kawatta" (君と出会って僕は変わった)		4:18

DVD Disc A
No.	Title	Artist(s)	Length
1.	"Ibisa Girl Music Video"
2.	"Ibisa Girl Music Video Dancing Version"
3.	"Densha o Oriru Music Video"	Team N
4.	"Ibisa Girl Bonus Footage: Riho Kotani challenges skydiving!"
5.	""Koko ni Datte Tenshi wa Iru" Stage Performance -2014.3.25-"	Team N

DVD Disc B
No.	Title	Artist(s)	Length
1.	"NMB48 Request Hour Set List Best 50 2014 (50th to 34th-place)"
2.	"Bonus Footage1: Oshaberi Gumi 2 First Part"
3.	"Bonus Footage2: Hajimete no Burari Hitori Tabi"	Yūri Ōta

=== Type-M ===
CD
No.	Title	Artist(s)	Length
1.	"Ibisa Girl" (イビサガール)		4:08
2.	"Bokura no Eureka" (僕らのユリイカ)		4:10
3.	"Kamonegikkusu" (カモネギックス)		4:17
4.	"Takane no Ringo" (高嶺の林檎)		4:38
5.	"Seito Techō no Shashin wa Ki ni Itte Inai no Hōsoku" ("生徒手帳の写真は気に入っていない"の法則)		4:58
6.	"Natsu no Saiminjutsu" (夏の催眠術)	Team M	4:14
7.	"Hinadan Deha Boku no Miryoku wa Ikinainda" (ひな壇では僕の魅力は生きないんだ)	Namba Teppōtai Sono San	3:48
8.	"Omowase Kōsen" (思わせ光線)	Akagumi	3:51
9.	"Yama e Ikō" (山へ行こう)	Namba Teppōtai Sono Go	4:50
10.	"Peak" (ピーク)		4:34
11.	"Isshūkan, Zenbu ga Getsuyōbi Nara Iinoni..." (一週間、全部が月曜日ならいいのに…)		4:28
12.	"Sunglass to Uchiake Banashi" (サングラスと打ち明け話)		4:36
13.	"Jikan wa Katari Hajimeru" (時間は語り始める)		3:56
14.	"Kamonegikkusu (Remo-Con REMIX)" (カモネギックス (Remo-Con REMIX))		5:10
15.	"Kimi to Deatte Boku wa Kawatta" (君と出会って僕は変わった)		4:18

DVD Disc A
No.	Title	Artist(s)	Length
1.	"Ibisa Girl Music Video"
2.	"Ibisa Girl Music Video Dancing Version"
3.	"Natsu no Saiminjutsu Music Video"	Team M
4.	"Ibisa Girl Bonus Footage: Riho Kotani challenges skydiving!"
5.	""Idol no Yoake" Stage Performance -2014.4.1-"	Team M

DVD Disc B
No.	Title	Artist(s)	Length
1.	"NMB48 Request Hour Set List Best 50 2014 (33th to 17th-place)"
2.	"Bonus Footage1: Oshaberi Gumi 2 Last Part"
3.	"Bonus Footage2: Hajimete no Burari Hitori Tabi"	Miru Shiroma

=== Type-B ===
CD
No.	Title	Artist(s)	Length
1.	"Ibisa Girl" (イビサガール)		4:08
2.	"Bokura no Eureka" (僕らのユリイカ)		4:10
3.	"Kamonegikkusu" (カモネギックス)		4:17
4.	"Takane no Ringo" (高嶺の林檎)		4:38
5.	"Seito Techō no Shashin wa Ki ni Itte Inai no Hōsoku" ("生徒手帳の写真は気に入っていない"の法則)		4:58
6.	"Kimi ni Yarareta" (君にヤラレタ)	Team BII	3:55
7.	"Mou Hadashi ni wa Narenai" (もう裸足にはなれない)	Namba Teppōtai Sono Yon	3:48
8.	"Yaban na Soft Cream" (野蛮なソフトクリーム)	Akagumi	4:26
9.	"Mizukiri" (水切り)	Akagumi	4:09
10.	"Heart no Dokusenken" (ハートの独占権)		4:20
11.	"Isshūkan, Zenbu ga Getsuyōbi Nara Iinoni..." (一週間、全部が月曜日ならいいのに…)		4:28
12.	"Sunglass to Uchiake Banashi" (サングラスと打ち明け話)		4:36
13.	"Jikan wa Katari Hajimeru" (時間は語り始める)		3:56
14.	"Kamonegikkusu (Remo-Con REMIX)" (カモネギックス (Remo-Con REMIX))		5:10
15.	"Kimi to Deatte Boku wa Kawatta" (君と出会って僕は変わった)		4:18

DVD Disc A
No.	Title	Artist(s)	Length
1.	"Ibisa Girl Music Video"
2.	"Ibisa Girl Music Video Dancing Version"
3.	"Kimi ni Yarareta Music Video"	Team BII
4.	"Ibisa Girl Bonus Footage: Riho Kotani challenges skydiving!"
5.	""Tadaima Renaichū" Stage Performance -2014.3.24-"	Team BII

DVD Disc B
No.	Title	Length
1.	"NMB48 Request Hour Set List Best 50 2014 (16th to 1st-place)"
2.	"Bonus Footage: NMB48 feat. Yoshimoto Shin Kigeki Vol.9"

=== Theater Edition ===
CD
No.	Title	Artist(s)	Length
1.	"Ibisa Girl" (イビサガール)		4:08
2.	"Bokura no Eureka" (僕らのユリイカ)		4:10
3.	"Kamonegikkusu" (カモネギックス)		4:17
4.	"Takane no Ringo" (高嶺の林檎)		4:38
5.	"Seito Techō no Shashin wa Ki ni Itte Inai no Hōsoku" ("生徒手帳の写真は気に入っていない"の法則)		4:58
6.	"Sōzō no Shijin" (想像の詩人)	Kenkyūsei	6:10
7.	"Todokanasou de Todoku Mono" (届かなそうで届くもの)		3:57
8.	"Sunglass to Uchiake Banashi" (サングラスと打ち明け話)		4:36
9.	"Kasa wa Iranai" (傘はいらない)		4:14
10.	"Jikan wa Katari Hajimeru" (時間は語り始める)		3:55
11.	"Isshūkan, Zenbu ga Getsuyōbi Nara Iinoni..." (一週間、全部が月曜日ならいいのに…)		4:29
12.	"Saya Nē" (さや姉)		5:28
13.	"Kamonegikkusu (Remo-Con REMIX)" (カモネギックス (Remo-Con REMIX))		5:10
14.	"Kimi to Deatte Boku wa Kawatta" (君と出会って僕は変わった)		4:18

== Charts ==
Chart (2014)	Peak position
Japan (Oricon Weekly Albums Chart)	1
Japan (Billboard Japan Top Albums Sales)	1

=== Year-end charts ===
Chart (2014)	Peak position
Japan (Oricon Yearly Albums Chart)	5
