= Love Wars (song) =

"Love♡Wars"
- The cover for the standard edition of "Love♡Wars" featuring (left to right) Tomomi Kasai as Elizabeth, Tomomi Itano (seated) as Queen, and Kamen Rider Double

Single by Queen & Elizabeth
- Released: March 31, 2010
- Genre: J-Pop
- Length: 4:17
- Label: Avex Trax
- Songwriters: Shoko Fujibayashi, Shuhei Naruse

"Love Wars" (stylized as "Love♡Wars") is a song by Queen & Elizabeth, fictional characters portrayed by AKB48 members Tomomi Itano and Tomomi Kasai, respectively, for the soundtrack of the 2009-2010 Kamen Rider Series Kamen Rider W.

== Overview ==
Itano and Kasai had been cast members of Kamen Rider W since September 2009 when "Love Wars" was first announced on January 22, 2010, with the music video filmed shortly after this announcement. Within the fiction of the show in episode 23, Itano and Kasai's characters Queen and Elizabeth compete in a Pop Idol-inspired contest called Fuuuuuutic Idol to win a record deal. When they are eliminated from the competition in favor of a much worse musician, they call upon the television show's protagonists Shotaro Hidari (Renn Kiriyama) and Philip (Masaki Suda) to investigate why they have lost, discovering that the rumored Radio Tower Clown is to blame. Soon after the case is closed, Queen and Elizabeth get their record deal after making another appearance on Fuuuuuutic Idol. At the same time, Kasai and Itano (in character) began hosting an Internet radio show connected with W on the fictional Wind Wave radio station titled Queen & Elizabeth's White Heart Mark (QueenとElizabethの白抜きハートマーク！, Kuīn to Erisabesu no Shironuki Hāto Māku).

Their single "Love♡Wars" was released on March 31, 2010, as four different variants: a standard CD single with no bonus tracks (Type-C), a CD+DVD single featuring a solo rendition of the title track by Itano as a bonus track (Type-A), a CD+DVD single featuring a solo rendition by Kasai as a bonus track (Type-B), and a CD+DVD single containing the fictional song Queen & Elizabeth "lost" from the television series (Type-D). While each different version of the CD has its own cover, a fifth variant cover exists for the standard CD+DVD release. The DVDs featured in each release include the music video, while the Type-A and Type-B releases also include a making-of documentary for the music video.

"Love♡Wars" reached the No. 4 spot on the Oricon Weekly Single Rankings chart, and remained in the charts for a total of 9 weeks.

== Track listing ==
All lyrics are written by Shoko Fujibayashi; all music is composed by Shuhei Naruse.

Standard edition CD (Type C)
No.	Title	Length
1.	"Love♡Wars"	4:20
2.	"Love♡Wars" (ACO Edit.)	4:27
3.	"Love♡Wars" (instrumental)	4:19
4.	"Love♡Wars" (ACO Edit.) (Instrumental)	4:28
Total length:		17:34

Standard edition DVD (Type C)
No.	Title	Length
1.	"Love♡Wars" (Music Film)

Type A bonus track
No.	Title	Length
5.	"Love♡Wars" (Tomomi Itano solo Edit.)	4:17
Total length:		21:50

Type B bonus track
No.	Title	Length
5.	"Love♡Wars" (Tomomi Kasai solo Edit.)	4:17
Total length:		21:50

Limited edition DVD bonus track (Type A & B)
No.	Title	Length
2.	"Making of Love♡Wars"

Standard edition bonus track (Type D)
No.	Title	Artist	Length
5.	"Futo Tower" (風都タワー Fūto Tawā)	Jimmy Nakata (Keisuke Tomita)
