= Nagiichi =

"Nagiichi （ナギイチ）"

Single by NMB48

from the album Teppen Tottande!
- B-side: "Rifujin Ball"; "Saigo no Catharsis" (Type-A); "Boku ga Mō Sukoshi Daitan nara" (Type-B); "Hatsukoi no Yukue to Play Ball" (Type-C); "Warukī" (Theater Edition)
- Released: May 9, 2012
- Label: laugh out loud! records
- Songwriter: Yasushi Akimoto
- Producer: Yasushi Akimoto

NMB48 singles chronology
"Junjō U-19" (2012)	"Nagiichi （ナギイチ）" (2012)	"Virginity" (2012)

Nagiichi (ナギイチ) is the fourth single by Japanese girl group NMB48. It has sold 375,785 copies. The title "Nagiichi" is shortened from "Nagisade ichiban kawaī GIRL!!" (渚で一番かわいいGIRL!!; lit. The cutest GIRL on the beach!!)

== Members ==
=== "Nagiichi" ===
Senbatsu* Centers: Sayaka Yamamoto, Watanabe Miyuki

- Team N: Mayu Ogasawara, Kanako Kadowaki, Riho Kotani, Rina Kondo, Kei Jonishi, Miru Shiroma, Aina Fukumoto, Nana Yamada, Sayaka Yamamoto, Akari Yoshida, Miyuki Watanabe
- Team M: Momoka Kinoshita, Eriko Jo, Airi Tanigawa, Ayaka Murakami, Fuuko Yagura

=== "Rifujin Ball" ===
Undergirls

- Team N: Rika Kishino, Haruna Kinoshita, Kanna Shinohara, Shiori Matsuda, Yuuki Yamaguchi
- Team M: Riona Ota, Rena Kawakami, Yuuka Kodokari, Yui Takano, Ayame Hikawa, Runa Fujita, Mao Mita, Sae Murase, Natsumi Yamagishi
- Kenkyūsei: Yuki Azuma, Yuumi Ishida, Mizuki Uno, Ayaka Okita, Narumi Koga, Arisa Koyanagi, Sorai Sato, Hiromi Nakagawa, Rurina Nishizawa, Momoka Hayashi, Mizuki Hara, Hitomi Yamamoto, Hono Akazawa, Akari Ishizuka, Anna Ijiri, Mirei Ueda, Mako Umehara, Yuuri Oota, Yuuka Katou, Emika Kamieda, Konomi Kusaka, Rina Kushiro, Hazuki Kurokawa, Saki Kono, Rikako Kobayashi, Nanami Sasaki, Kamo Sugimoto, Riko Takayama, Sora Togo, Riko Hisada, Arisa Miura, Kanako Muro, Syu Yabushita, Tsubasa Yamauchi

=== "Saigo no Catharsis" ===
Shirogumi

- Team N: Riho Kotani, Haruna Kinoshita, Rina Kondo, Rika Kishino, Kei Jonishi, Kanna Shinohara, Aina Fukumoto, Sayaka Yamamoto
- Team M: Eriko Jo, Ayaka Murakami, Fuuko Yagura, Yuuka Kodakari

=== "Boku ga Mou Sukoshi Daitan Nara" ===
Akagumi

- Team N: Mayu Ogasawara, Kanako Kadowaki, Miru Shiroma, Nana Yamada, Akari Yoshida, Yuuki Yamaguchi, Miyuki Watanabe
- Team M: Airi Tanigawa, Momoka Kinoshita, Keira Yogi, Ayame Hikawa, Rena Shimada

=== "Hatsukoi no Yukue to Play Ball" ===
NMB Seven

- Team N: Mayu Ogasawara, Aina Fukumoto, Nana Yamada, Sayaka Yamamoto, Miyuki Watanabe
- Team M: Eriko Jo, Airi Tanigawa

=== "Warukii" ===
- Team N: Miyuki Watanabe

== Oricon charts ==
Release	Oricon Singles Chart	Peak position	Debut sales (copies)	Sales total (copies)
May 9, 2012	Daily Chart	1	231,200	449,098
May 9, 2012	Weekly Chart	2	375,785	449,098
May 9, 2012	Monthly Chart	4	410,142	449,098
