= Junjō U-19 =

Single by NMB48

from the album Teppen Tottande!
- B-side: "Baatari Go!"; "Doryoku no Shizuku" (Type-A); "Migi e Magare!" (Type-B); "Ren'ai no Speed" (Type-C); "Jungle Gym" (Theater Edition)
- Released: January 25, 2012
- Label: laugh out loud! records
- Songwriter: Yasushi Akimoto
- Producer: Yasushi Akimoto

NMB48 singles chronology
"Oh My God!" (2011)	"Junjō U-19" (2012)	"Nagiichi" (2012)

"Junjō U-19" (純情U-19, "Innocence Under 19") is Japanese idol group NMB48's third single. It was released on January 25, 2012. This is the first single to feature members from Team M which was formed on January 26, 2012. The single was released in four editions: Type-A, Type B, Type-C and a Theater edition, all of which contains different B-sides. Upon its release "Junjō U-19" topped the Oricon weekly chart and Billboard Japan Hot 100.

== Live performances ==
The group first performed the song during the Hey! Hey! Hey! 2011 Christmas special which aired on December 19.

== Members ==
On December 18, 2011, the senbatsu (選抜; "selection") members were revealed.

=== "Junjou U-19" ===
- Team N: Mayu Ogasawara, Kanako Kadowaki, Rika Kishino, Haruna Kinoshita, Riho Kotani, Rina Kondo, Kei Jonishi, Miru Shiroma, Aina Fukumoto, Nana Yamada, Sayaka Yamamoto, Miyuki Watanabe
- Team M: Momoka Kinoshita, Eriko Jo, Fuuko Yagura, Keira Yogi

=== "Baatari Go!" ===
Performed by Undergirls

- Team N: Kanna Shinohara, Yuuki Yamaguchi
- Team M: Riona Ota, Rena Kawakami, Yuuka Kodokari, Yui Takano, Airi Tanigawa, Ayame Hikawa, Runa Fujita, Mao Mita, Ayaka Kurakami, Sae Murase, Natsumi Yamagishi
- Kenkyuusei: Yuki Azuma, Yuumi Ishida, Mizuki Uno, Risako Okada, Ayaka Okita, Narumi Koga, Arisa Koyanagi, Sorai Sato, Hiromi Nakagawa, Rurina Nishizawa, Momoka Hayashi, Mizuki Hara, Hitomi Yamamoto

=== "Doryoku no Shizuku" ===
Performed by Shirogumi

- Team N: Mayu Ogasawara, Kanako Kadowaki, Rika Kishino, Haruna Kinoshita, Kanna Shinohara, Nana Yamada, Sayaka Yamamoto
- Team M: Yuuka Kodakari, Eriko Jo, Natsumi Yamagishi, Keira Yogi
- Kenkyuusei: Ayaka Okita

=== "Migi e Magare!" ===
Akagumi

- Team N: Riho Kotani, Rina Kondo, Kei Jonishi, Miru Shiroma, Aina Fukumoto, Yuuki Yamaguchi, Miyuki Watanabe
- Team M: Momoka Kinoshita, Airi Tanigawa, Ayame Hikawa, Ayaka Murakami, Fuuko Yagura

=== "Renai no Speed" ===
NMB Seven

- Team N: Mayu Ogasawara, Kei Jonishi, Aina Fukumoto, Nana Yamada, Sayaka Yamamoto, Miyuki Watanabe
- Kenkyuusei: Eriko Jo

=== "Jungle Gym" ===
- Team N: Sayaka Yamamoto

== Charts and certifications ==
=== Weekly charts ===
Chart (2012)	Peak position
Japan (Billboard Japan Hot 100)	1
Japan (Oricon)	1
Japan (RIAJ Digital Track Chart)	32
