= Romance Privacy =

Single by French Kiss
- Released: July 18, 2012 (Japan)

French Kiss singles chronology
"Saisho no Mail" (2011)	"Romance Privacy" (2012)	"Omoidasenai Hana" (2014)

"Romance Privacy" (ロマンス・プライバシー) is the 5th single by Japanese idol girl group French Kiss, a sub-unit of AKB48. It was released on July 18, 2012. It debuted in 2nd place on the weekly Oricon Singles Chart and was the 81st best-selling single in Japan in 2012, with 98,214 copies. It also reached 2nd place on the Billboard Japan Hot 100.
