= Virginity (song) =

Single by NMB48

from the album Teppen Tottande!
- B-side: "Mōsō Girlfriend"; "Bokura no Regatta" (Type-A); "Sonzai Shiteinai Mono" (Type-B); "Sunahama de Pistol" (Type-C); "Chotto Nekoze" (Theater Edition); "Milky no Chapuchapu Type-A" (Type-A); "Milky no Chapuchapu Type-B" (Type-B); "Milky no Chapuchapu Type-C" (Type-C)
- Released: August 8, 2012
- Label: laugh out loud! records
- Songwriter: Yasushi Akimoto
- Producer: Yasushi Akimoto

NMB48 singles chronology
"Nagiichi" (2012)	"Virginity" (2012)	"Kitagawa Kenji" (2012)

Music video
- NMB48 "Virginity" (Short ver.) on YouTube

"Virginity" (ヴァージニティー, Vājinitī) is the fifth single by Japanese girl group NMB48.

== Track listing ==
Type-A edition CD
No.	Title	Artist(s)	Length
1.	"Virginity" (ヴァージニティー Vājinitī)
2.	"Mōsō Girlfriend" (妄想ガールフレンド Mōsō Gārufurendo, "Wishful Girlfriend")
3.	"Bokura no Regatta" (僕らのレガッタ, "Our Regatta")	Shirogumi (白組)
4.	"Milky no Chapuchapu Type-A" (みるきーのちゃぷちゃぷ Type-A Mirukī no Chapuchapu)	Miyuki Watanabe's Bathing Sound Effect (渡辺美優紀の入浴効果音)
5.	"Virginity" (off vocal ver.)
6.	"Mōsō Girlfriend" (off vocal ver.)
7.	"Bokura no Regatta" (off vocal ver.)

Type-A edition DVD
No.	Title	Length
1.	"Virginity" (Music Video)
2.	"Virginity" (Music Video Dance Mix Version)
3.	"Mōsō Girlfriend" (Music Video)
4.	"Bokura no Regatta" (Music Video)
5.	"Special Film 'Goodnight Film, Part 1'" (特典映像「おやすみ映像 前編」 Tokuten Eizō "Oyasumi Eizō Zenpen")

Type-B edition CD
No.	Title	Artist(s)	Length
3.	"Sonzai Shitenai Mono" (存在してないもの, "I Do Not Exist")	Akagumi (紅組)
4.	"Milky no Chapuchapu Type-B"
7.	"Sonzai Shiteinai Mono" (off vocal ver)

Type-B edition DVD
No.	Title	Length
4.	"Sonzai Shitenai Mono" (Music Video)
5.	"Special Film 'Goodnight Film, Part 2'" (特典映像「おやすみ映像 後編」 Tokuten Eizō "Oyasumi Eizō Kōhen")

Type-C edition CD
No.	Title	Artist(s)	Length
3.	"Sunahama de Pistol" (砂浜でピストル Sunahama de Pisutoru, "Pistol on a Sandy Beach")	Namba Teppōtai Sono Ichi (難波鉄砲隊其之壱)
4.	"Milky no Chapuchapu Type-C"
7.	"Sunahama de Pistol" (off vocal ver.)

Type-C edition DVD
No.	Title	Length
4.	"Sunahama de Pistol" (Music Video)
5.	"NMB feat. Yoshimoto Shinkigeki Vol.4" (NMB feat.吉本新喜劇 Vol.4)

Theater edition CD
No.	Title	Artist(s)	Length
1.	"Virginity"
2.	"Bokura no Regatta"	Shirogumi
3.	"Sonzai Shitenai Mono"	Akagumi
4.	"Chotto Nekoze" (ちょっと猫背, "Stooped Over a Little")
5.	"Virginity" (off vocal ver)
6.	"Bokura no Regatta" (off vocal ver.)
7.	"Sonzai Shitenai Mono" (off vocal ver.)
8.	"Chotto Nekoze" (off vocal ver)

== Members ==
=== "Virginity" ===
- Team N: Mayu Ogasawara, Kanako Kadowaki, Rika Kishino, Haruna Kinoshita, Riho Kotani, Kei Jōnishi, Miru Shiroma, Aina Fukumoto, Nana Yamada, Sayaka Yamamoto, Akari Yoshida, Miyuki Watanabe
- Team M: Eriko Jō, Airi Tanigawa
- Kenkyūsei 3rd Generation: Yūka Katō, Shū Yabushita

=== "Mōsō Girlfriend" ===
- Team N: Mayu Ogasawara, Kanako Kadowaki, Rika Kishino, Haruna Kinoshita, Riho Kotani, Kei Jōnishi, Miru Shiroma, Aina Fukumoto, Nana Yamada, Sayaka Yamamoto, Akari Yoshida, Miyuki Watanabe
- Team M: Eriko Jō, Airi Tanigawa
- Kenkyūsei 3rd Generation: Yūka Katō, Shū Yabushita

=== "Bokura no Regatta" ===
Shirogumi

- Team N: Rina Kondō, Kei Jōnishi, Nana Yamada, Sayaka Yamamoto
- Team M: Rena Shimada, Eriko Jō, Mao Mita, Sae Murase
- Kenkyūsei 2nd Generation: Yuki Azuma, Hitomi Yamamoto
- Kenkyūsei 3rd Generation: Rina Kushiro, Kanako Muro

=== "Sonzai Shiteinai Mono" ===
Akagumi

- Team N: Mayu Ogasawara, Kanna Shinohara, Aina Fukumoto, Yūki Yamaguchi, Akari Yoshida, Miyuki Watanabe
- Team M: Ayaka Okita, Yui Takano, Natsumi Yamagishi
- Kenkyūsei 2nd Generation: Momoka Hayashi
- Kenkyūsei 3rd Generation: Hono Akazawa, Tsubasa Yamauchi

=== "Sunahama de Pistol" ===
Namba Teppōtai Sono Ichi

- Team N: Riho Kotani, Shiori Matsuda
- Team M: Ayame Hikawa, Ayaka Murakami, Fūko Yagura, Keira Yogi
- Kenkyūsei 3rd Generation: Yūka Katō, Shū Yabushita

=== "Chotto Nekoze" ===
- Team M: Riona Ōta, Rena Kawakami, Runa Fujita
- Kenkyūsei 1st Generation: Arisa Koyanagi
- Kenkyūsei 2nd Generation: Yūmi Ishida, Mizuki Uno, Narumi Koga, Sorai Satō, Hiromi Nakagawa, Rurina Nishizawa, Momoka Hayashi
- Kenkyūsei 3rd Generation: Anri Ishizuka, Anna Ijiri, Mirei Ueda, Mako Umehara, Yūri Ōta, Emika Kamieda, Konomi Kusaka, Rina Kushiro, Hazuki Kurokawa, Saki Kōno, Rikako Kobayashi, Kano Sugimoto, Riko Takayama, Sora Tōgō, Riko Hisada, Arisa Miura, Kanako Muro, Tsubasa Yamauchi

== Oricon Charts ==
Release	Oricon Singles Chart	Peak position	Debut sales (copies)	Sales total (copies)
August 8, 2012	Daily Chart	1	269,386	395,655
August 8, 2012	Weekly Chart	1	315,205	395,655
August 8, 2012	Monthly Chart	2	336,624	395,655
