= Jane Doe (Minami Takahashi song) =

- Type C cover art

Single by Minami Takahashi
- A-side: "Jane Doe"
- B-side: Yabureta Hane (破れた羽根); Sabita Rock (錆びたロック); Rikoteki na Renai (利己的な恋愛); Migikata (右肩); Buenos Aires ni Ame ga Furu (ブエノスアイレスに雨が降る)
- Released: April 3, 2013
- Genre: J-pop
- Length: 4:45
- Label: Universal Music Japan / NAYUTAWAVE Records
- Songwriter: Yasushi Akimoto
- Producer: Yasushi Akimoto

Minami Takahashi singles chronology
"Jane Doe" (2013)	"Kodoku wa Kizutsukanai" (2017)

Music video
- "Jane Doe" on YouTube

"Jane Doe" is the debut single by Japanese singer Minami Takahashi. It was released on April 3, 2013. The A-side is used as theme song for the Japanese drama Saki. The single was released in four versions, three CD Maxi+DVD editions and a limited theater edition.

The song is a rock ballad written from a male perspective, depicted as being in a relationship he can't resist falling in love with one woman even after being disrespected, deceived by her and finally losing everything. The tracks follow the A-side upbeat feel, except for the ballads "Yabureta Hane" and Type C exclusive track, "Migikata", originally a song from Atsuko Maeda's second single Kimi wa Boku da.

== Track listing ==
All lyrics written by Yasushi Akimoto.

=== Type A ===
CD track list
No.	Title	Composer	Length
1.	"Jane Doe"	Akio Hayakawa	4:45
2.	"Yabureta Hane" (破れた羽根 "Broken Wings")	Mineaki Kawahara	4:01
3.	"Sabita Rock" (錆びたロック "Rusted Rock")	Shinya Sumida	3:57
4.	"Jane Doe off vocal ver."	Akio Hayakawa	4:45
5.	"Yabureta Hane off vocal ver." (破れた羽根 "Broken Wings")	Mineaki Kawahara	4:01
6.	"Sabita Rock off vocal ver." (錆びたロック "Rusted Rock")	Shinya Sumida	3:57

DVD track list
No.	Title	Length
1.	"Jane Doe" (music video)
2.	"Yabureta Hane" (music video)
3.	"The Path of Takahashi Minami, Part 1 ~The Small General Manager Who Brings Together a Giant Group~" (高橋みなみの軌跡 前編 ～巨大グループをまとめる小さな総監督～)
4.	"Making of Jane Doe"

=== Type B ===
CD track list
No.	Title	Composer	Length
1.	"Jane Doe"	Akio Hayakawa	4:45
2.	"Yabureta Hane" (破れた羽根 "Broken Wings")	Mineaki Kawahara	4:01
3.	"Rikoteki na Renai" (利己的な恋愛 "Selfish Love")	Masatoshi Moriwaki	4:12
4.	"Jane Doe off vocal ver."	Akio Hayakawa	4:45
5.	"Yabureta Hane off vocal ver." (破れた羽根 "Broken Wings")	Mineaki Kawahara	4:01
6.	"Rikoteki na Renai off vocal ver." (利己的な恋愛 "Selfish Love")	Masatoshi Moriwaki	4:12

DVD track list
No.	Title	Length
1.	"Jane Doe" (music video)
2.	"Yabureta Hane" (music video)
3.	"The Path of Takahashi Minami, Part 2 ~The Hard Work Paid Off After 6 Years, 8 Months, and 18 Days~" (高橋みなみの軌跡 後編 ～報われた6年8ヶ月18日の努力～)
4.	"Making of Yabureta Hane"

=== Type C ===
CD track list
No.	Title	Composer	Length
1.	"Jane Doe"	Akio Hayakawa	4:45
2.	"Yabureta Hane" (破れた羽根 "Broken Wings")	Mineaki Kawahara	4:01
3.	"Migikata" (右肩 "Your Right Shoulder", Atsuko Maeda cover)	Katsuhiko Sugiyama	5:08
4.	"Jane Doe off vocal ver."	Akio Hayakawa	4:45
5.	"Yabureta Hane off vocal ver." (破れた羽根 "Broken Wings")	Mineaki Kawahara	4:01
6.	"Migikata off vocal ver." (右肩 "Your Right Shoulder")	Katsuhiko Sugiyama	5:08

DVD track list
No.	Title	Length
1.	"Jane Doe" (music video)
2.	"Yabureta Hane" (music video)
3.	"Solo Debut Commemorative Talk Takahashi Minami x Akimoto Yasushi ~2nd Single Lyrics Meeting~" (ソロデビュー記念対談 高橋みなみ×秋元 康 ～2ndシングル作詞会議～)

=== Theater edition ===
CD
No.	Title	Composer	Length
1.	"Jane Doe"	Akio Hayakawa	4:45
2.	"Yabureta Hane" (破れた羽根 "Broken Wings")	Mineaki Kawahara	4:01
3.	"Buenos Aires ni Ame ga Furu" (ブエノスアイレスに雨が降る "Rain Falls in Buenos Aires")	Shuji Watanabe, Ryuichi Kureha	4:11
4.	"Jane Doe off vocal ver."	Akio Hayakawa	4:45
5.	"Yabureta Hane off vocal ver." (破れた羽根 "Broken Wings")	Mineaki Kawahara	4:01
6.	"Buenos Aires ni Ame ga Furu off vocal ver." (ブエノスアイレスに雨が降る "Rain Falls in Buenos Aires")	Shuji Watanabe, Ryuichi Kureha	4:11

== Charts ==
Year	Chart	Position
2013	Oricon Weekly Singles Chart	2
2013	Billboard Japan Hot 100	1

- The single sold 45,645 copies on the first day of release and 85,493 copies in the first week of release.
