= Perapera Perao =

Single by Not Yet
- Released: November 16, 2011
- Label: Future Seven
- Songwriter: Yasushi Akimoto
- Producer: Akimoto

Not Yet singles chronology
""Naminori Kakigōri""	"Perapera Perao"	""Suika Baby""

"Perapera Perao" (ペラペラペラオ) is a single by Not Yet.
