= Shortcake (Yuki Kashiwagi song) =

Single by Yuki Kashiwagi
- B-side: "Soredemo Nakanai"; "Sakura no Ki ni Narō (acoustic version)
- Released: February 6, 2013
- Genre: J-pop
- Length: 29:38 (type A); 28:54 (type B); 28:04 (type C)
- Label: Avex / YukiRing; AVCA-62291/B (type A, regular); AVCA-62288/B (type A, limited); AVCA-62292/B (type B, regular); AVCA-62289/B (type B, limited); AVCA-62293/B (type C, regular); AVCA-62290/B (type C, limited); AVC1-62294/B (Theater Edition)
- Songwriter(s): Yasushi Akimoto (lyrics)
- Producer(s): Yasushi Akimoto

Yuki Kashiwagi singles chronology
"Shortcake" (2013)	"Birthday Wedding" (2013)

"Shortcake" (ショートケーキ) is the debut single of AKB48 member Yuki Kashiwagi. It was released on February 6, 2013 by Avex Group under its YukiRing brand, named after Kashiwagi's nickname Yukirin.

== Track listing ==
All lyrics are written by Yasushi Akimoto.

Type A track listing
No.	Title	Arranger	Length
1.	"Shortcake"	YUMA	4:38
2.	"Soredemo Nakanai"	Satomi Kawasaki	4:43
3.	"Sakura no Ki ni Narō" (acoustic version featuring Kotaro Oshio)	Oshio	5:29
4.	"Shortcake" (off-vocal version)	YUMA	4:38
5.	"Soredemo Nakanai" (off-vocal version)	Kawasaki	4:43
6.	"Sakura no Ki ni Narō" (off-vocal version)	Oshio	5:29
Total length:			29:38

== Tie-ups ==
- TV Tokyo: Mieri no Kashiwagi (ミエリーノ柏木) opening theme and insert song (tracks 1 and 2)

== Chart performance ==
Release	Oricon Singles Chart	Peak position	Debut sales (copies)	Sales total (copies)
February 6, 2013	Daily Chart	1	45,333	126,864
February 6, 2013	Weekly Chart	2	104,799	126,864
February 6, 2013	Monthly Chart			126,864
February 6, 2013	Yearly Chart			126,864

Chart (2013)	Peak position
Japan (Japan Hot 100)	2
