= Diva (Japanese band) =

Japanese idol girl group

- Origin: Tokyo, Japan
- Genre: Pop
- Years active: 2011–2014
- Label: avex trax
- Spinoff of: AKB48
- Past members: Sae Miyazawa; Ayaka Umeda; Sayaka Akimoto; Yuka Masuda
- Website: avex.jp/diva/

Diva (stylized as "DiVA" and "DIVA") was a sub-unit of Japanese idol girl group AKB48 that was active from 2011 to 2014. Its members are: Sayaka Akimoto, Sae Miyazawa, Ayaka Umeda, and Yuka Masuda. The group has released four singles that have peaked in Oricon's top 10.

== History ==
The formation of Diva was revealed to Sayaka Akimoto and Sae Miyazawa on January 10, 2011, and disclosed to public by the all Diva members at the AKB48 Theater on February 27, 2011. The initial four-member unit consisted of Sayaka Akimoto, Sae Miyazawa, Ayaka Umeda, and Yuka Masuda. All four members are signed by the entertainment agency Flave Entertainment, formerly known as Office48. The concept of the unit is "The first-ever Dance & Vocal unit from AKB48". They were originally scheduled to release their debut single on April 27, 2011, but on April 1, it was announced that the release date had been postponed to May 18 due to the aftermath of the 2011 Tōhoku earthquake and tsunami. The A-side song, "Tsuki no Ura gawa" (月の裏側, Reverse side of the Moon), was written by Yasushi Akimoto (no relation to Sayaka), as well as some B-side songs including AKB48 Team-K's theater-performed song "Blue Rose", and one of the songs recorded on Type-B CD, "Information" (インフォメーション), was written by Tetsuya Komuro. They performed publicly at the Kobe Collection in Shanghai on April 16, 2011.

It was announced on the official Diva blog that Akimoto would continue her activities in Diva even after leaving AKB48 on August 22, 2013 at AKB48's Tokyo Dome Concert while her last stage performance was to be on August 28. In March 2014, Diva released a cover version of "Wow War Tonight" by H Jungle with t. The song was only available for download from SoftBank's mobile phone application, and did not feature Masuda. In August 2014, it was announced that the group would be reuniting before the end of 2014 for the last time to release their final single, their first album, and a farewell concert. Former AKB48 member Masuda's participation was also confirmed. This final single named "Discovery", was released on October 8, 2014, and was sold in four different versions.

== Discography ==
=== Singles ===
Release	Title	Copies sold	Chart positions		
Release	Title	Copies sold	Oricon Singles Charts	Billboard Japan Hot 100	RIAJ digital tracks*
May 18, 2011	"Tsuki no Uragawa" (月の裏側; "The Other Side of the Moon")	87,276	3	4	32
August 10, 2011	Cry	68,813	2	6	-
March 21, 2012	Lost the way	77,417	3	6	13
October 8, 2014	Discovery	30,159	4		

*RIAJ Digital Tracks established April 2009.
