= Naminori Kakigōri =

Single by Not Yet
- Released: March 16, 2011
- Label: Future Seven
- Songwriter: Yasushi Akimoto
- Producer: Akimoto

Not Yet singles chronology
| ""Shūmatsu Not Yet"" | "Naminori Kakigōri" | ""Perapera Perao"" |

"Naminori Kakigōri" (波乗りかき氷) is a single by Not Yet. It reached number-one in the Oricon Weekly Chart and number-one in the Japan Hot 100 chart.
