= Kitagawa Kenji (song) =

"Kitagawa Kenji (北川謙二)"

Single by NMB48

from the album Teppen Tottande!
- Released: November 7, 2012
- Songwriter: Yasushi Akimoto
- Producer: Yasushi Akimoto

NMB48 singles chronology
"Virginity" (2012)	"Kitagawa Kenji (北川謙二)" (2012)	"Bokura no Eureka" (2013)

"Kitagawa Kenji" (北川謙二) is the sixth single by Japanese girl group NMB48.

== Members ==
=== "Kitagawa Kenji" ===
- Team N: Mayu Ogasawara, Kanako Kadowaki, Rika Kishino, Riho Kotani, Kei Jonishi, Miru Shiroma, Aina Fukumoto, Nana Yamada, Sayaka Yamamoto, Akari Yoshida, Miyuki Watanabe
- Team M: Airi Tanigawa, Fuuko Yagura
- Team BII: Yuuka Katou, Shu Yabushita
- Team A/Unknown: Yui Yokoyama

=== "Hoshizora no Caravan" ===
Shirogumi

- Team N: Mayu Ogasawara, Rina Kondo, Sayaka Yamamoto, Akari Yoshida
- Team M: Yuki Azuma, Ayaka Okita, Momoka Kinoshita, Yui Takano
- Team BII: Hono Akazawa, Tsubasa Yamauchi
- Kenkyūsei: Momoka Hayashi
- Team A/Unknown: Yui Yokoyama

=== "Renai Higaitodoke" ===
Akagumi

- Team N: Haruna Kinoshita, Aina Fukumoto, Yuuki Yamaguchi, Nana Yamada, Miyuki Watanabe
- Team M: Rena Kawakami, Rena Shimada, Ayame Hikawa, Mao Mita, Fuuko Yagura
- Team BII: Hazuki Kurokawa, Kanako Muro

=== "Fuyushougun no Regret" ===
Namba Teppoudai Ni

- Team N: Shiori Matsuda
- Team M: Fuuko Yagura, Natsumi Yamagishi, Hitomi Yamamoto, Keira Yogi
- Team BII: Yuuka Katou, Rina Kushiro, Shu Yabushita

=== "In-Goal" ===
- Team N: Mayu Ogasawara, Kanako Kadowaki, Rika Kishino, Kei Jonishi, Shiori Matsuda, Sayaka Yamamoto, Akari Yoshida, Miyuki Watanabe
- Team M: Ayaka Okita, Arisa Koyanagi, Airi Tanigawa, Sae Murase, Fuuko Yagura, Natsumi Yamagishi
- Team BII: Emika Kamieda, Rikako Kobayashi

=== "Nemuku Naru made Hitsuji wa Detekonai" ===
Undergirls

- Team N: Kanna Shinohara
- Team M: Riona Ota, Ayaka Murakami
- Team BII: Akari Ishizuka, Anna Ijiri, Mirei Ueda, Mako Umehara, Yuuri Ota, Konomi Kusaka, Saki Kono
- Kenkyuusei: Yuumi Ishida, Mizuki Uno, Narumi Koga, Sorai Sato, Kano Sugimoto, Riko Takayama, Sora Togo, Hiromi Nakagawa, Rurina Nishizawa, Riko Hisada, Arisa Miura

== Oricon Charts ==
Release	Oricon Singles Chart	Peak position	Debut sales (copies)	Sales total (copies)
November 7, 2012	Daily Chart	1	259,984	409,409
November 7, 2012	Weekly Chart	1	317,051	409,409
November 7, 2012	Monthly Chart	1	350,108	409,409
