= Omoidasenai Hana =

Single by French Kiss
- Released: October 1, 2014 (Japan)
- Songwriters: Yasushi Akimoto, Makoto Wakatabe

French Kiss singles chronology
"Romance Privacy" (2014)	"Omoidasenai Hana" (2014)

"Omoidasenai Hana" (思い出せない花) is a single by Japanese idol girl group French Kiss, a sub-unit of AKB48. It was released on October 1, 2014. It debuted in 2nd place on the weekly Oricon Singles Chart, with 37,788 copies, and reached 5th place on the Billboard Japan Hot 100.
