= Hirihiri no Hana =

Single by Not Yet
- Released: September 25, 2013

Not Yet singles chronology
""Suika Baby""	"Hirihiri no Hana"

"Hirihiri no Hana" (ヒリヒリの花) is a single by the Japanese idol girl group Not Yet. It reached number one on the Oricon Singles Chart.
