= Tsuki no Uragawa =

"Tsuki no Uragawa (月の裏側; The Other Side of the Moon)"

Single by DiVA
- Released: May 18, 2011 (Japan)
- Recorded: 2011; Japan
- Genre: J-POP
- Length: 26:32（Type-A・D） 25:28（Type-B・E） 28:52（Type-C・F）
- Label: avex trax
- Composer: Nao Morisaki
- Lyricist: Yasushi Akimoto
- Producer: Yasushi Akimoto

DiVA singles chronology
"Tsuki no Uragawa (月の裏側; The Other Side of the Moon)" (2011)	"Cry" (2011)

"Tsuki no Uragawa" is the debut single released by DiVA. The single was certified in May 2011 by the RIAJ as gold for physical copies shipped.

== Information ==
"Tsuki no Uragawa" is the debut single released by DiVA. It was released in seven versions: six limited and regular CD+DVD editions (types A, B, and C), and a limited CD-only theater edition. The limited CD+DVD editions came with a debut commemoration event ticket, while the theater edition came with one of four photos and a release commemoration handshake event ticket.

The single was originally scheduled to be released on April 27, but it was postponed until May 18 due to the 2011 Tōhoku earthquake and tsunami.

== Track listing ==
All lyrics are written by Yasushi Akimoto, except Type B・E #2 by Tetsuya Komuro.

Limited Edition CD Type A・Regular Edition CD Type D
No.	Title	Music	Arranger(s)	Length
1.	"Tsuki no Uragawa"	Nao Morisaki	Earth Pine Productions.	4:26
2.	"Fade out"	Itou Tokoroten rou	Earth Pine Productions.	4:42
3.	"Tsuki no Uragawa（Instrumental）"	Nao Morisaki	Earth Pine Productions.	4:26
4.	"Fade out（Instrumental）"	Itou Tokoroten rou	Earth Pine Productions.	4:42

Limited Edition CD Type B・Regular Edition CD Type E
No.	Title	Music	Arranger(s)	Length
1.	"Tsuki no Uragawa"	Nao Morisaki	Earth Pine Productions.	4:26
2.	"Information"	Tetsuya Komuro	Tetsuya Komuro, Koji Kubo	4:29
3.	"Tsuki no Uragawa（Instrumental）"	Nao Morisaki	Earth Pine Productions.	4:26
4.	"Information（Instrumental）"	Tetsuya Komuro	Tetsuya Komuro, Koji Kubo	4:29

Limited Edition CD Type C・Regular Edition CD Type F
No.	Title	Music	Arranger(s)	Length
1.	"Tsuki no Uragawa"	Nao Morisaki	Earth Pine Productions.	4:26
2.	"Blue rose -DiVA ver.-"	Kouji Ueda	Hiroshi Matsui	4:26
3.	"Tsuki no Uragawa（Instrumental）"	Nao Morisaki	Earth Pine Productions.	4:26
4.	"Blue rose -DiVA ver.-（Instrumental）"	Kouji Ueda	Hiroshi Matsui	4:26

Limited Edition CD Type G (Theater)
No.	Title	Music	Arranger(s)	Length
1.	"Tsuki no Uragawa"	Nao Morisaki	Earth Pine Productions.	4:26
2.	"Tsuki no Uragawa -RoyalMirrorball Mix-"	Nao Morisaki	Earth Pine Productions.	4:26
3.	"Tsuki no Uragawa（Instrumental）"	Nao Morisaki	Earth Pine Productions.	4:26
4.	"Tsuki no Uragawa -RoyalMirrorball Mix-（Instrumental）"	Nao Morisaki	Earth Pine Productions.	4:26

DVD Type A・D
No.	Title	Length
1.	"Tsuki no Uragawa" (video clip)
2.	"Tsuki no Uragawa" (Special Making Movie)

DVD Type B・E
No.	Title	Length
1.	"Tsuki no Uragawa" (video clip)
2.	"DiVA Member no Kiseki Document Eizou"

DVD Type C・F
No.	Title	Length
1.	"Tsuki no Uragawa" (video clip)
2.	"AKB48 Member Kara DiVA e no Message Eizou"

=== Oricon Chart ===
Released	Oricon Chart	Weekly Peak	Debut Sales	Sales Total	Chart Run
May 18, 2011	Daily Singles Chart	4		73,890	1 week
May 18, 2011	Weekly Singles Chart	3		73,890	1 week
May 18, 2011	Monthly Singles Chart			73,890	1 week
