= Suika Baby =

Single by Not Yet
- Released: May 30, 2012
- Label: Future Seven
- Songwriter: Yasushi Akimoto
- Producer: Akimoto

Not Yet singles chronology
""Perapera Perao""	"Suika Baby"	""Hirihiri no Hana""

"Suika Baby" (西瓜BABY) is a single by Not Yet. It reached number one in the Oricon Weekly Chart.
