= Saisho no Mail =

Single by French Kiss
- Released: November 22, 2011 (Japan)

French Kiss singles chronology
"'Kakko warui I love you'" (2011)	"Saisho no Mail" (2011)	"Romance Privacy" (2012)

"Saisho no Mail" (最初のメール) is a single by Japanese idol girl group French Kiss, a sub-unit of AKB48. It was released on November 22, 2011. It debuted in number one on the weekly Oricon Singles Chart and, as of May 7, 2012 (issue date), had sold 154,223 copies. It also reached 2nd place on the Billboard Japan Hot 100.
