= Not Yet (band) =

Japanese girl group

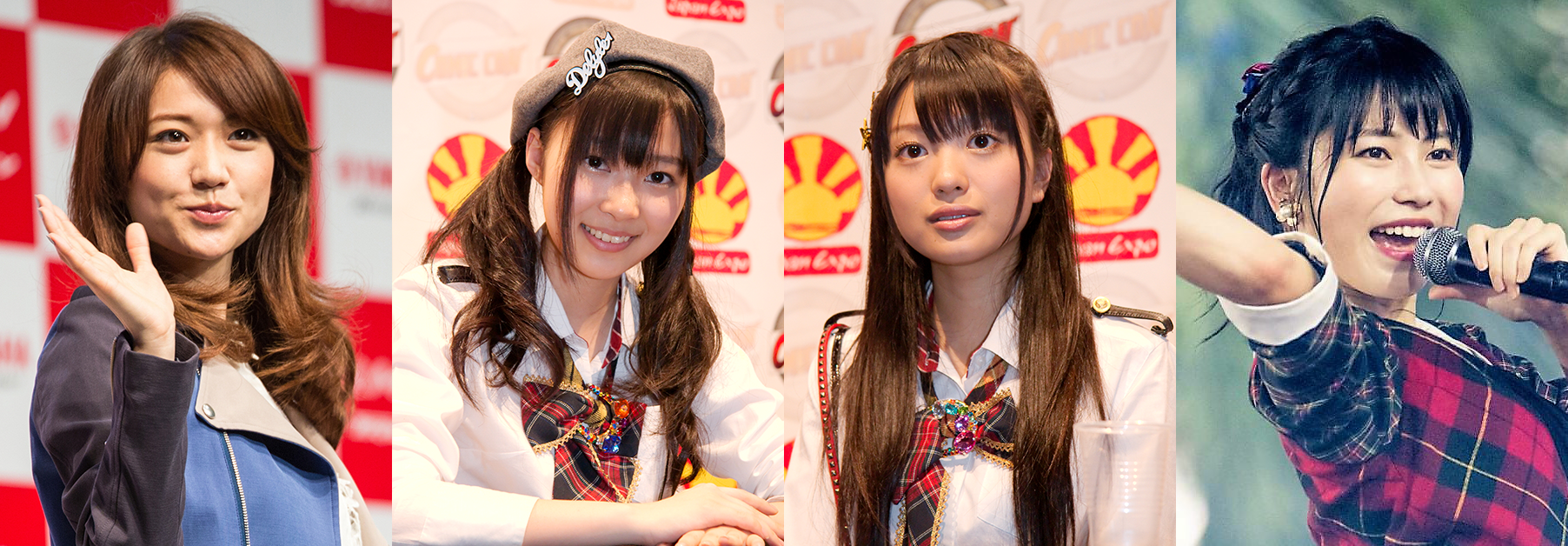
- Members of Not Yet, from left to right: Yuko Oshima, Rino Sashihara, Rie Kitahara, and Yui Yokoyama

Background information
- Origin: Tokyo, Japan
- Genres: Pop
- Years active: 2011–2015
- Labels: Future Seven; Nippon Columbia
- Members: Yuko Oshima; Rino Sashihara; Rie Kitahara; Yui Yokoyama
- Website: columbia.jp/notyet/

Not Yet (stylized as Not yet, pronounced as Notto Yetto (ノット・イェット)) was a sub-unit of the all-female Japanese pop group AKB48.

== History ==
The formation of Not Yet was announced at AKB48's Request Hour Set List Best 100 2011 on January 21, 2011. Their producer Yasushi Akimoto, who is also the producer of AKB48, revealed he named the group "Not Yet" because the members' dancing and singing skills were, as he described, not very good yet. They released their debut single "Shūmatsu Not Yet (週末Not yet, "Weekend Not Yet") on March 16, 2011. The song, written by Akimoto, is about lovers who cannot wait for the weekend. Their album already, released on April 23, 2014, reached number one on the Weekly Oricon Albums Chart, selling 68,111 copies.

They performed the Japanese credits song for Hop (film) called "Hug Tomo".

== Members ==
- Yui Yokoyama (AKB48's Team A, NMB48)
- Rino Sashihara (AKB48's Team B, HKT48)
- Yuko Oshima (AKB48's Team K)
- Rie Kitahara (AKB48's Team A, Team B, Team K, SKE48, NGT48)

== Discography ==
=== Singles ===
Year	Title	Sales	Chart positions			Album
Year	Title	Sales	Oricon Singles Charts	Billboard Japan Hot 100	RIAJ digital tracks	Album
2011	"Shūmatsu Not Yet" (週末Not yet, "Weekend Not yet")	247,688	1	1	2	Already
2011	"Naminori Kakigōri" (波乗りかき氷)	208,164	1	1	6	Already
2011	"Perapera Perao" (ペラペラペラオ)	211,686	2	2	14	Already
2012	"Suika Baby" (西瓜BABY, "Watermelon Baby")	171,574	1	2	9	Already
2013	"Hirihiri no Hana" (ヒリヒリの花)	127,855	1	1	–	Already
