= Shūmatsu Not Yet =

Single by Not Yet
- Released: March 16, 2011
- Label: Future Seven
- Songwriter: Yasushi Akimoto
- Producer: Akimoto

Not Yet singles chronology
| "Shūmatsu Not Yet" | ""Naminori Kakigōri"" |

"Shūmatsu Not Yet" (週末Not yet) is a single by Not Yet. It reached number-one in the Oricon Weekly Chart and number-one in the Japan Hot 100 chart.
