= Teppen Tottande! =

Studio album by NMB48
- Released: February 27, 2013
- Recorded: 2011–2013
- Genre: J-pop
- Label: laugh out loud! records
- Producer: Yasushi Akimoto

Teppen Tottande! (てっぺんとったんで!) ("Because We Got The Top!") is an album by NMB48. It topped the Oricon weekly albums chart in March 2013.

== Details ==
The album was released on February 27, 2013, in Japan and reached the top spot in sales of Oricon, selling 328,000 copies in the first week. It is available in several versions (Type "N", "M" or "B") with pockets and different content, and a special edition sold only at the theater where the group produces. It contains the first six singles' group previously released.

== Track listing ==
=== Type-N ===
CD
No.	Title	Artist(s)	Length
1.	"Teppen Tottande!" (てっぺんとったんで!)		4:06
2.	"Zetsumetsu Kurokami Shōjo" (絶滅黒髪少女 "Extinct Black-haired Girls")		3:48
3.	"Oh My God!" (オーマイガー!)		4:17
4.	"Junjō U-19" (純情U-19 "Innocence Under 19")		3:46
5.	"Nagiichi" (ナギイチ "The Cutest Girl in the Beach")		4:07
6.	"Virginity" (ヴァージニティ)		4:12
7.	"Kitagawa Kenji" (北川謙二 "Kenji Kitagawa")		3:48
8.	"HA!" (NMB48 Version)		4:13
9.	"12/31" (12月31日 "31 December")		4:18
10.	"Lily"	Team N	6:11
11.	"Jungle Gym" (ジャングルジム)	Sayaka Yamamoto	5:10
12.	"Hoshokushatachi yo" (捕食者たちよ)	Akagumi	4:26
13.	"NMB48"		3:58
14.	"Seishun No Laptime" (青春のラップタイム "Laptime of Youth")		4:48
15.	"Boku wa Matteru" (僕は待ってる "I'm Waiting")		3:45
16.	"Message from Sayaka Yamamoto (iTunes only)" (山本彩 メッセージ)		0:54

DVD
No.	Title	Length
1.	"12/31 Music Video"
2.	"NMB48 Kinki Concert Tour: Minasan Chapu Chapu Shimasho @2012.8.21"

=== Type-M ===
CD
No.	Title	Artist(s)	Length
1.	"Teppen Tottande!" (てっぺんとったんで!)		4:06
2.	"Zetsumetsu Kurokami Shōjo" (絶滅黒髪少女 "Extinct Black-hair Girls")		3:48
3.	"Oh My God!" (オーマイガー!)		4:17
4.	"Junjō U-19" (純情U-19 "Innocence Under 19")		3:46
5.	"Nagiichi" (ナギイチ "The Cutest Girl in the Beach")		4:07
6.	"Virginity" (ヴァージニティ)		4:12
7.	"Kitagawa Kenji" (北川謙二 "Kenji Kitagawa")		3:48
8.	"HA!" (NMB48 Version)		4:13
9.	"12/31" (12月31日 "31 December")		4:19
10.	"With my soul"	Team M	4:19
11.	"Warukii" (わるきー)	Miyuki Watanabe	4:02
12.	"Kesshō" (結晶 "Crystal")	Shirogumi	4:26
13.	"Namekuji Heart" (なめくじハート)	Chō Idol Senbatsu	3:29
14.	"NMB48"		3:58
15.	"Seishun No Laptime" (青春のラップタイム "Laptime of Youth")		4:48
16.	"Boku wa Matteru" (僕は待ってる)		3:45
17.	"Message from Miyuki Watanabe (iTunes only)" (渡辺美優紀 メッセージ)		0:52

DVD
No.	Title	Artist(s)	Length
1.	"12/31 Music Video"
2.	"NMB48 Osaka Jūban Shōbu @2012.5.3 Orix Theater"	Team N

=== Type-B ===
CD
No.	Title	Artist(s)	Length
1.	"Teppen Tottande!" (てっぺんとったんで!)		4:06
2.	"Zetsumetsu Kurokami Shōjo" (絶滅黒髪少女 "Extinct Black-hair Girls")		3:48
3.	"Oh My God!" (オーマイガー!)		4:17
4.	"Junjō U-19" (純情U-19 "Innocence Under 19")		3:46
5.	"Nagiichi" (ナギイチ "The Cutest Girl in the Beach")		4:07
6.	"Virginity" (ヴァージニティ)		4:12
7.	"Kitagawa Kenji" (北川謙二 "Kenji Kitagawa")		3:48
8.	"HA!" (NMB48 Version)		4:13
9.	"12/31" (12月31日 "31 December")		4:19
10.	"Almond Croissant Keikaku" (アーモンドクロワッサン計画)	Team BII	5:23
11.	"Mikazuki no Senaka" (三日月の背中 "Back of The Crescent Moon")		4:00
12.	"Fuyushougun no Regret" (冬将軍の リグレット"Regret of Old Man Winter")	Namba Teppōtai Sono Ni	4:22
13.	"Dazai Osamu o Yonda Ka?" (太宰治を読んだか?)		4:44
14.	"NMB48"		3:58
15.	"Seishun no Laptime" (青春のラップタイム "Laptime of Youth")		4:48
16.	"Boku wa Matteru" (僕は待ってる)		3:45
17.	"Message from Nana Yamada (iTunes only)" (山田菜々 メッセージ)		0:58

DVD
No.	Title	Length
1.	"12/31 Music Video"
2.	"Teppen Tottande! Complete Version"

=== Theater Edition ===
CD
No.	Title	Artist(s)	Length
1.	"Teppen Tottande!" (てっぺんとったんで!)		4:06
2.	"Zetsumetsu Kurokami Shōjo" (絶滅黒髪少女 "Extinct Black-haired Girls")		3:48
3.	"Oh My God!" (オーマイガー!)		4:17
4.	"Junjō U-19" (純情U-19 "Innocence Under 19")		3:46
5.	"Nagiichi" (ナギイチ "The Cutest Girl in the Beach")		4:07
6.	"Virginity" (ヴァージニティ)		4:12
7.	"Kitagawa Kenji" (北川謙二 "Kenji Kitagawa")		3:48
8.	"HA!" (NMB48 Version)		4:13
9.	"12/31" (12月31日 "31 December")		4:18
10.	"Lily"	Team N	6:11
11.	"With my soul"	Team M	4:19
12.	"Almond Croissant Keikaku" (アーモンドクロワッサン計画)	Team BII	5:24
13.	"NMB48"		3:58
14.	"Seishun No Laptime" (青春のラップタイム "Laptime of Youth")		4:48
15.	"Boku wa Matteru" (僕は待ってる "I'm Waiting")		3:45
16.	"Message from Shu Yabushita, Airi Tanigawa and Miru Shiroma (iTunes only)" (薮下柊、谷川愛梨、白間美瑠 メッセージ)		1:54

== Charts ==
Chart (2013)	Peak position
Japan (Oricon Weekly Albums Chart)	1
Japan (Billboard Japan Top Albums Sales)	1

=== Year-end charts ===
Chart (2013)	Peak position
Japan (Oricon Yearly Albums Chart)	3

== See also ==
- List of number-one albums of 2013 (Japan)
