= French Kiss (band) =

Japanese pop group

- Origin: Tokyo, Japan
- Genres: J-pop; Pop
- Years active: 2010–2015
- Labels: avex entertainment
- Members: Yuki Kashiwagi; Asuka Kuramochi; Aki Takajō
- Website: mv.avex.jp/french-kiss/

French Kiss (フレンチ・キス, Furenchi Kisu) was a sub-unit of all-female Japanese pop group AKB48, produced by Yasushi Akimoto.

== History ==
It was announced on June 28, 2010 by Kashiwagi Yuki that French Kiss would be formed and debuted with a single Zutto mae kara (ずっと前から, Since long time before), at AKB48 Team-B's stage performance. "Zutto mae kara" was used as the ending theme song for anime "Major sixth season", broadcast on NHK Educational TV. The catchphrase of the group is "Oya ni shoukai shitai 3nin gumi" (「親に紹介したい3人組」, "Trio whom (I) would like to introduce to (my) parents).

After 4 months from release of the 1st single on September 8, 2010, they released 2nd single "If" on January 19, 2011, which ranked 2nd after Tomohisa Yamashita's single "Hadakanbō" (はだかんぼー, "Naked") on Oricon Weekly Chart, and 1st on Billboard Japan Hot 100 ranking dated on January 31, bounced up from 73rd on prior week's ranking. The 4th single"Saisho no mail"(最初のメール) was released on November 22, 2011.

In 2015, the sub-unit was disbanded.

=== Members ===
- Asuka Kuramochi (倉持明日香, Kuramochi Asuka) (AKB48's Team B)
- Aki Takajo (高城亜樹, Takajo Aki) (AKB48's Team K)
- Yuki Kashiwagi (柏木由紀, Kashiwagi Yuki) (AKB48's Team B, NGT48)

== Discography ==
=== Singles ===
Release	Title	Sales	Chart positions		
Release	Title	Sales	Oricon Singles Charts	Billboard Japan Hot 100	RIAJ digital tracks*
2010	"Zutto mae kara" (ずっと前から, "Since long time ago")	52,141	5	5	91
2011	"If"	97,113	2	1	22
2011	"Kakko warui I love you" (カッコ悪いI love you, "Uncool I love You")	142,810	2	3	26
2011	"Saisho no Mail" (最初のメール, "First e-mail")	145,163	1	2	24
2012	"Romance Privacy" (ロマンス・プライバシー)	98,214	2	2	
2014	"Omoidasenai Hana" (思い出せない花)	43,381	2	5	

*RIAJ Digital Tracks established April 2009.
