= If (French Kiss song) =

Single by French Kiss
- Released: January 19, 2011 (Japan)

French Kiss singles chronology
"'Zutto mae kara'" (2011)	"If" (2011)	"Kakko warui I love you" (2011)

"If" is a single by Japanese idol girl group French Kiss, a sub-unit of AKB48. It was released on January 19, 2011. It debuted in 2nd place on the weekly Oricon Singles Chart and, as of May 30, 2011 (issue date), had sold 97,113 copies. It also reached number one on the Billboard Japan Hot 100.
