= Bokura no Eureka =

Single by NMB48
- Released: June 19, 2013
- Songwriter: Yasushi Akimoto
- Producer: Yasushi Akimoto

NMB48 singles chronology
"Kitagawa Kenji" (2012)	"Bokura no Eureka" (2013)	"Kamonegikkusu" (2013)

Music videos
- "Bokura no Eureka" on YouTube (Short ver.)
- "Bokura no Eureka" on YouTube Dance Ver. (Short ver.)
- "Okuba" on YouTube (Short ver.)
- "Yabanna Softcream" on YouTube (Short ver.)

Bokura no Eureka (僕らのユリイカ, Bokura no Yuriika) is the seventh single by Japanese girl group NMB48.

== Release ==
The single was released in four versions: Type A, B, C and Theater Edition. Each of the limited editions came with a bonus DVD will different contents except for similar title track music video. First Press versions of each came with a lottery ticket for handshake event, trading card (1 of 16 for each type – 48 total), and raw photo (1 of 63). The coupling song "Todokana Soude Todoku Mono" was used as the theme song to NMB's comedy show "Geinin! 2".

== Track listing ==
=== Type-A ===
CD
No.	Title	Artist(s)	Length
1.	"Bokura no Eureka" (僕らのユリイカ)		4:10
2.	"Todokekana Soude Todoku Mono" (届かなそうで届くもの)
3.	"Okuba" (奥歯)	Shirogumi
4.	"Bokura no Eureka off vocal ver."
5.	"Todokekana Soude Todoku Mono off vocal ver."
6.	"Okuba off vocal ver."

DVD
No.	Title	Length
1.	"Bokura no Eureka (Music Video)"
2.	"Bokura no Eureka (Music Video Dance Ver.)"
3.	"Okuba (Music Video)"
4.	"Riho Kotani vs Tsukitei Hosei Hetare Taiketsu (Part 1)"

=== Type-B ===
CD
No.	Title	Artist(s)	Length
1.	"Bokura no Eureka" (僕らのユリイカ)
2.	"Todokekana Soude Todoku Mono" (届かなそうで届くもの)
3.	"Yabanna Softcream" (野蛮なソフトクリーム)	Akagumi
4.	"Bokura no Eureka off vocal ver."
5.	"Todokekana Soude Todoku Mono off vocal ver."
6.	"Yabanna Softcream off vocal ver."

DVD
No.	Title	Length
1.	"Bokura no Eureka (Music Video)"
2.	"Bokura no Eureka (Music Video Dance Ver.)"
3.	"Yabanna Softcream (Music Video)"
4.	"Riho Kotani vs Tsukitei Hosei Hetare Taiketsu (Part 2)"

=== Type-C ===
CD
No.	Title	Artist(s)	Length
1.	"Bokura no Eureka" (僕らのユリイカ)
2.	"Todokekana Soude Todoku Mono" (届かなそうで届くもの)
3.	"Hinadande wa Boku no Miryoku wa Ikinainda" (ひな壇では僕の魅力は生きないんだ)	Namba Teppoutai Sono San
4.	"Bokura no Eureka off vocal ver."
5.	"Todokekana Soude Todoku Mono off vocal ver."
6.	"Hinadande wa Boku no Miryoku wa Ikinainda off vocal ver."

DVD
No.	Title	Length
1.	"Bokura no Eureka (Music Video)"
2.	"Bokura no Eureka (Music Video Dance Ver.)"
3.	"Hinadande wa Boku no Miryoku wa Ikinainda (Music Video)"
4.	"NMB48 feat. Yoshimotoshinkigeki Vol.6"

=== Theater Edition ===
CD
No.	Title	Artist(s)	Length
1.	"Bokura no Eureka" (僕らのユリイカ)
2.	"Okuba" (奥歯)	Shirogumi
3.	"Yabanna Softcream" (野蛮なソフトクリーム)	Akagumi
4.	"Sayanee" (さや姉)
5.	"Bokura no Eureka off vocal ver."
6.	"Okuba off vocal ver."
7.	"Yabanna Softcream off vocal ver."
8.	"Sayanee off vocal ver."

== Members ==
=== "Bokura no Eureka" ===
(Center: Sayaka Yamamoto)

- Team N: Miori Ichikawa, Mayu Ogasawara, Riho Kotani, Kei Jonishi, Miru Shiroma, Sayaka Yamamoto, Akari Yoshida, Miyuki Watanabe
- Team M: Rena Shimada, Yui Takano, Airi Tanigawa, Fuuko Yagura, Nana Yamada, Keira Yogi
- Team BII: Yuuka Katou, Shu Yabushita

=== "Todokekana Soude Todoku Mono" ===
- Team N: Mayu Ogasawara, Haruna Kinoshita, Riho Kotani, Rina Kondo, Kei Jonishi, Miru Shiroma, Sayaka Yamamoto, Akari Yoshida, Miyuki Watanabe
- Team M: Momoka Kinoshita, Nana Yamada
- Team BII: Yuri Ota, Rina Kushiro, Shu Yabushita
- Team A (AKB48): Yui Yokoyama

=== "Okuba" ===
Shirogumi

- Team N: Mayu Ogasawara, Rika Kishino, Haruna Kinoshita, Yuuki Yamaguchi, Kanako Kadowaki, Sayaka Yamamoto
- Team M: Yuki Azuma, Natsumi Yamagishi, Nana Yamada, Ayaka Murakami
- Team BII: Konomi Kusaka, Emika Kamieda

=== "Yabanna Softcream" ===
Akagumi

- Team N: Miori Ichikawa, Narumi Koga, Rina Kondo, Miyuki Watanabe
- Team M: Mao Mita, Ayaka Okita, Rena Kawakami, Fuuko Yagura, Momoka Kinoshita
- Team BII: Hazuki Kurokawa, Kanako Muro, Rikako Kobayashi

=== "Hinadande wa Boku no Miryoku wa Ikinainda" ===
Namba Teppoutai Sono San

- Team N: Miru Shiroma, Aika Nishimura
- Team M: Sae Murase, Keira Yogi
- Team BII: Hono Akazawa, Yuuri Ota
- Kenkyuusei: Nagisa Shibuya, Rina Yamao

=== "Sayanee" ===
This song is about team captain Sayaka Yamamoto.

- Team M: Arisa Koyanagi
- Team BII: Akari Ishizuka, Anna Ijiri, Mirei Ueda, Mako Umehara, Kono Saki, Tsubasa Yamauchi
- Kenkyuusei: Natsuko Akashi, Yumi Ishida, Masako Ishihara, Mizuki Uno, Mai Odan, Noa Ogawa, Chihiro Kawakami, Momoka Shimazaki, Riko Takayama, Honoka Terui, Hiromi Nakagawa, Reina Nakano, Rurina Nishizawa, Momoka Hayashi, Chiho Matsuoka, Megumi Matsumura, Arisa Miura, Ayaka Morita, Rina Yamao
