= Kanjani8 no Janiben =

- Genre: Variety show
- Starring: Kanjani8 (You Yokoyama; Subaru Shibutani; Shingo Murakami; Ryuhei Maruyama; Shota Yasuda; Ryo Nishikido; Tadayoshi Okura)
- Country of origin: Japan
- Original language: Japanese

Production
- Running time: 55 minutes

Original release
- Network: Kansai TV
- Release: May 2, 2007

Kanjani8 no Janiben (関ジャニ∞のジャニ勉) is a Japanese TV show hosted by the members of the group Kanjani8. The show began airing on May 2, 2007, and is broadcast every Wednesday night on Kansai TV from 0:35 AM to 1:30 AM (before April 20, 2011, it was broadcast from 0:35 AM to 1:05 AM ).

== Cast ==
- Kanjani8 (hosts) (You Yokoyama, Subaru Shibutani, Shingo Murakami, Ryuhei Maruyama, Shota Yasuda, Ryo Nishikido, Tadayoshi Okura)
- Keiko Fujimoto (narrator)
- Masato Den (narrator)
- Kansai Jr. (Juniben/Junideka/Junimaga section hosts) (Junta Nakama, Akito Kiriyama, Daichi Nakata, Takahiro Hamada)

== Broadcasting details ==
=== 2007 ===
Episode	Air date	Guest	Notes
1	May 2, 2007	High Heel	
2	May 9, 2007	Shohei Shofukutei	
3	May 16, 2007	Ikko	
4	May 23, 2007	Hikomaro	
5	May 30, 2007	Yasuei Yakushiji	
6	June 6, 2007	Hiroshi Madoka	
7	June 13, 2007	Noriko Aota	
8	June 20, 2007	Tetsuro Degawa	
9	June 27, 2007	Hideki Yashiro	
10	July 4, 2007	Duke Saraie	
11	July 11, 2007	Zakoba Katsura	(Part 1)
12	July 18, 2007	Zakoba Katsura	(Part 2)
13	July 25, 2007	Yasushi Ishida; Yamada Hanako	(Part 1)
14	August 1, 2007	Yasushi Ishida; Yamada Hanako	(Part 2)
15	August 8, 2007	Chisako Takashima	
16	August 15, 2007	Masashi Nakayama	(Part 1)
17	August 22, 2007	Masashi Nakayama	(Part 2)
18	August 29, 2007	Hiroyuki Yamamoto	
19	September 5, 2007	Hidekazu Akai	
20	September 12, 2007	Miyako Takeuchi; Yoshiko Shimizu	
21	September 19, 2007	Tetsuya Miyazaki	
22	October 3, 2007	Daisuke Shima	
23	October 10, 2007	Toru Yamazaki	
24	October 17, 2007	Jaguar Yokota; Hirokatsu Kinoshita	
25	October 24, 2007	Fujiwara	
26	October 31, 2007		Okinawa Location Special (Part 1)
27	November 7, 2007		Okinawa Location Special (Part 2)
28	November 14, 2007	Speed Wagon	
29	November 21, 2007	Nobuhiro Takeda	
30	November 28, 2007	Sumiko Nishioka	
	December 1, 2007 (Saturday)	Takajin Yashiki	Zukkoke Otoko Michi Special
31	December 5, 2007	Akimasa Haraguchi	
32	December 12, 2007	Lou Ohshiba	
33	December 19, 2007	Ungirls	
34	December 26, 2007	Yusuke Kamiji	

=== 2008 ===
Episode	Air date	Guest	Notes
35	January 9, 2008	Yoshiaki Kanemura	
36	January 16, 2008	Kuwabata Ohara	
37	January 23, 2008	Papaya Suzuki	
38	January 30, 2008	Okada Masuda	
39	February 6, 2008	Kabachan	
40	February 13, 2008	Unjash	
41	February 20, 2008	Sandwich Man	
42	February 27, 2008	TIM	
43	March 5, 2008	Eiji Bando	
44	March 12, 2008	Junji Takada	
45	March 19, 2008	Bananaman	
46	March 26, 2008		Sōshūhen Benkyō ni Narimashita Special (Part 1)
47	April 2, 2008		Sōshūhen Benkyō ni Narimashita Special (Part 2)
48	April 9, 2008	Shogo Kariyazaki	Renewal
49	April 16, 2008	Aki Hano	
50	April 23, 2008	Peter	
51	April 30, 2008	Kazuhiko Kanayama; Miyoko Yoshimoto	
52	May 7, 2008	Kazumasa Koura	
53	May 14, 2008	Yasuda Dai Circus	
54	May 21, 2008	Yasuha	
55	May 28, 2008	Toru Watanabe	
56	June 4, 2008	Tamotsu Kuroda	
57	June 11, 2008	Motoya Izumi	
58	June 18, 2008	Masanori Ishii	
59	June 25, 2008	The Touch	
60	July 2, 2008	Marie	
61	July 9, 2008	Kai Ato	
62	July 16, 2008	Yoko Kumada; Jun Natsukawa	
63	July 23, 2008	Ai Haruna	
64	July 30, 2008	Genki Sudo	
65	August 6, 2008	Hiroshi Madoka	
66	August 13, 2008	Junji Inagawa	
67	August 20, 2008	Croquette	
68	August 27, 2008	Musashi	
69	September 3, 2008	Sayuri Kokushō	
70	September 10, 2008	Chris Matsumura	
71	September 17, 2008	Akira Nishikino	
72	September 24, 2008	Shigeru Matsuzaki	
73	October 8, 2008	Shunichi Kawai	
74	October 15, 2008	TKO	(Part 1)
75	October 22, 2008	TKO	(Part 2)
76	October 29, 2008	Zakoba Katsura; Mai Sekiguchi	
77	November 5, 2008	Shin Kōda	
78	November 12, 2008	Ichikawa Shunen II	
79	November 19, 2008	Bobby Ologun	
80	November 26, 2008	Shigenori Yamazaki	
81	December 3, 2008	Takafumi Ogura	
82	December 10, 2008	Haruhiko Kato	
83	December 17, 2008	Gal Sone	
	December 27, 2008 (Saturday)	Emiko Kaminuma	Special

=== 2009 ===
Episode	Air date	Guest	Notes
84	January 7, 2009	Ayana Tsubaki	
85	January 14, 2009	Koji Matoba	
86	January 21, 2009	Piko	
87	January 28, 2009	Princess Tenko	
88	February 4, 2009	Hiroko Moriguchi	
89	February 11, 2009	Coolpoko	
90	February 18, 2009	Iyo Matsumoto	
91	February 25, 2009	Narumi	
92	March 4, 2009	Naomasa Musaka	
93	March 11, 2009	Audrey	
94	March 18, 2009	Tarō Yamamoto	
95	March 25, 2009		Bakushō Mikōkai Special
96	April 1, 2009	Tamotsu Kuroda; Hachimitsu Tsukitei	
97	April 8, 2009	Hiroiki Ariyoshi	
98	April 15, 2009	Masanobu Katsumura	
99	April 22, 2009	Yoshihiro Akiyama	
100	April 29, 2009	Nakamura Shichinosuke	
101	May 6, 2009	Shinji Uchiyama	
102	May 13, 2009	Buffalo Goro	
103	May 20, 2009	Saori Takizawa	
104	May 27, 2009	Antoki no Inoki	
105	June 3, 2009	Ikue Sakakibara	
106	June 10, 2009	Ken Mogi	
107	June 17, 2009	Ryuhei Ueshima	
108	June 24, 2009	Yasue Michi; Kazutoyo Koyabu	
109	July 1, 2009	Nobuhiko Takada	
110	July 8, 2009	George Takahashi	
111	July 15, 2009	Hokuyō	
112	July 22, 2009	Michiko Shimizu	
113	July 29, 2009	Masakazu Aihara; Sekai no Nabeatsu	(Part 1)
114	August 5, 2009	Masakazu Aihara; Sekai no Nabeatsu	(Part 2)
115	August 12, 2009	Hosshan	
116	August 19, 2009	Hokuyō	Hokkaido Location Special (Part 1)
117	August 26, 2009	Hokuyō	Hokkaido Location Special (Part 2)
118	September 2, 2009	Mari Hamada	
119	September 9, 2009	Knights	
120	September 16, 2009	Jo Hye Ryun	
121	September 23, 2009	Asian	
122	September 30, 2009	Yumi Adachi	
123	October 7, 2009	Tokuma Nishioka	
124	October 14, 2009	Ryota Yamasato	
125	October 21, 2009	Sheila	
126	October 28, 2009	Yoko Minamino	
127	November 4, 2009	Yoshio Kojima	
128	November 11, 2009	Yoshio Nomura	
129	November 18, 2009		Hokkaido Location Special
130	November 25, 2009	Miki Fujimoto	
131	December 2, 2009	Britney Hamada	
132	December 9, 2009	Monster Engine	
133	December 16, 2009	Shampoo Hat	
134	December 23, 2009	Kazuhiko Nishimura	

=== 2010 ===
Episode	Air date	Guest	Notes
135	January 6, 2010	Seiji Miyane	
136	January 13, 2010	Total Tenbosch	
137	January 20, 2010	Dangerous	
138	January 27, 2010	Ayako Nishikawa	
139	February 3, 2010	Chidori	
140	February 10, 2010	Eiji Bando	
141	February 17, 2010	Mikihisa Azuma	
142	February 24, 2010	Jun Komori	
143	March 3, 2010	Garage Sale	
144	March 10, 2010	Fuyuki Moto	
145	March 17, 2010	Cowcow	
146	March 24, 2010	Tomomi Nishimura	
147	March 31, 2010	Kenji Tamura	Renewal
148	April 7, 2010	Koji Abe	
149	April 14, 2010	Megumi Yokoyama	
150	April 21, 2010	Hiroshi Madoka	
151	April 28, 2010	Shiho	
152	May 5, 2010	Waraimeshi	
153	May 12, 2010	Youn-a	
154	May 19, 2010	Yoji Tanaka	
155	May 26, 2010	Fujiwara	
156	June 2, 2010	Punkbooboo	
157	June 9, 2010	Rei Kikukawa	
158	June 16, 2010		Beppin Guests Mikōkai Special
159	June 23, 2010	Hanamaru-Daikichi Hakata	
160	June 30, 2010	Ikko	
161	July 7, 2010	Keisuke Okada	
162	July 14, 2010	Akito Matsumoto	
163	July 21, 2010	Chiharu Niiyama	Aomori Location Special (Ryuhei Maruyama, Shota Yasuda)
164	July 28, 2010	Tetsuro Degawa	
165	August 4, 2010	Mari Natsuki	
166	August 11, 2010	Peter	
167	August 18, 2010	Hokuyo	
168	August 25, 2010	Misako Yasuda	
169	September 1, 2010	Kazushi Sakuraba	
170	September 8, 2010	Sei Ashina	
171	September 15, 2010	Daisuke Motoki	
172	September 22, 2010	Mari Hamada	
173	September 29, 2010	Kirin	
174	October 6, 2010	Hibiki	
175	October 13, 2010	Yoichi Watanabe	
176	October 27, 2010	Riyo Mori	
177	November 3, 2010	Mitz Mangrove; Nadja Grandiva	
178	November 10, 2010	Sekai no Nabeatsu; Razor Ramon RG	
179	November 17, 2010	Yuri Nakamura	
180	November 24, 2010	Reina Triendl	
181	December 1, 2010	Ranko Kanbe	Miyazaki Location Special (You Yokoyama, Shingo Murakami, Tadayoshi Okura)
182	December 8, 2010	Hidehiko Ishizuka	
183	December 15, 2010	Ahn Mika	
184	December 22, 2010	Emiri Miyasaka	
185	December 29, 2010		Beppin Guests Mikōkai Special

=== 2011 ===
Episode	Air date	Guest	Notes
186	January 12, 2011	Karen Michibata; Angelica Michibata	
187	January 19, 2011	TKO; Yutaka Onedari; Michako Murase; Tokushu Menkyo	
188	January 26, 2011	Junichi Ishida	
189	February 2, 2011	U-ji Kōji	
190	February 9, 2011	Hinano Yoshikawa	
191	February 16, 2011	Natsuki Kato	Akita Location Special (You Yokoyama, Shota Yasuda, Tadayoshi Okura)
192	February 23, 2011	LIZA	
193	March 2, 2011	Saori Takizawa	Nagano Location Special (Subaru Shibutani, Shingo Murakami, Ryuhei Maruyama)
194	March 9, 2011	Total Tenbosch	Shizuoka Location Special (Shota Yasuda, Ryo Nishikido, Tadayoshi Okura)
195	March 23, 2011	Sawa Suzuki	Shizuoka Location Special (Shota Yasuda, Ryo Nishikido, Tadayoshi Okura)
196	March 30, 2011	Youn-a	
197	April 6, 2011		Sōshūhen Special
198	April 20, 2011	Fujiwara	Renewal
199	April 27, 2011	Kohei Otomo	
200	May 4, 2011	Becky	
201	May 11, 2011	Nakamura Kantarō II	
202	May 18, 2011	Tutorial	
203	May 25, 2011	Aki Hoshino	
204	June 1, 2011	Shingo Yanagisawa	
205	June 8, 2011	Takashi Sasano	
206	June 15, 2011	Wagaya; Tetsuji from Shampoo Hat	
207	June 22, 2011	Shoko Haida	
208	June 29, 2011	Akina Minami	
209	July 6, 2011	Aya Sugimoto	
210	July 13, 2011	Aya Hirayama	
211	July 20, 2011	Tsubasa Masuwaka	
212	July 27, 2011	Kuwabata Ohara	
213	August 3, 2011	King Kong	
214	August 10, 2011	Daiki Hyodo; Hiroshi Madoka; Hachimitsu Tsukitei; Chidori; Warai Meshi	∞ no Yuzurenai Natsuyasumi Special (You Yokoyama, Subaru Shibutani, Shingo Murakami)
215	August 17, 2011	Shinichi Hatori	
216	August 24, 2011	Tooru Kazama	
217	August 31, 2011	Ayako Nishikawa	
218	September 7, 2011	Kenji Tamura	
219	September 14, 2011	Yuki Morisaki	
220	September 21, 2011	Riko Higashio	
221	September 28, 2011	Tanoshingo	
222	October 5, 2011	Sandwich Man	
223	October 12, 2011	Airi Taira	
224	October 19, 2011	Rozan	
225	October 26, 2011	RIKACO (Rikako Murakami)	
226	November 2, 2011	Nakagawake	
227	November 9, 2011	Nanao	
228	November 16, 2011	Mari Hoshino	
229	November 23, 2011	Oriental Radio	
230	November 30, 2011	Ryōsei Tayama	
231	December 7, 2011	Kendō Kobayashi	
232	December 14, 2011	Non Style	
233	December 21, 2011	Rei Okamoto	
234	December 28, 2011	Yoko Aramaki; Karakuri Doll (magician); Amemiya	

=== 2012 ===
Episode	Air date	Guest	Notes
235	January 11, 2012	Mai Satoda	
236	January 18, 2012	Chiaki	
237	January 25, 2012	Impulse	
238	February 1, 2012	Aki Hano	
239	February 8, 2012	Koki Tanaka	
240	February 15, 2012	Hannya	
241	February 22, 2012	Jun Komori	
242	February 29, 2012	Haraichi	
243	March 7, 2012	Shinagawa Shōji; Oniyakko Tsubaki	Okinawa Location Special (Part 1) (Shota Yasuda, Ryo Nishikido, Tadayoshi Okura)
244	March 14, 2012	Seiji Chihara (Chihara Kyodai)	Okinawa Location Special (Part 2) (Shota Yasuda, Ryo Nishikido, Tadayoshi Okura)
245	March 21, 2012	Croquette	
246	March 28, 2012	Mai Oshima	
247	April 4, 2012	Ungirls	
248	April 11, 2012	Satoumi	
249	April 18, 2012	Christine Haruka	
250	April 25, 2012	Noriko Maeda	
251	May 2, 2012	Mikie Hara	
252	May 9, 2012	Ginshari	
253	May 16, 2012	Fruit Punch	
254	May 23, 2012	Ai Maeda	
255	May 30, 2012	Ayano Fukada	
256	June 6, 2012	Slim Club	
257	June 13, 2012	Tomochika	
258	June 20, 2012	Yoko Gushiken	
259	June 27, 2012	Aiku Maikawa	
260	July 4, 2012	Risa Yoshiki	
261	July 11, 2012	Nana Suzuki	
262	July 18, 2012	Youn-a	
263	July 25, 2012	Tatsuya Kawagoe	
264	August 1, 2012	IMALU	
265	August 8, 2012	LiLiCo	
266	August 15, 2012	Kazutoyo Koyabu	
267	August 22, 2012	Ayako Nishikawa	
268	August 29, 2012	Michael Tomioka	
269	September 5, 2012	Robert	
270	September 12, 2012	Ai Haruna	
271	September 19, 2012	Shampoo Hat	
272	September 26, 2012	Satoko Koizumi	
273	October 3, 2012	Takehiro Kimoto from TKO; Danchō Yasuda from Yasuda Dai Circus	Renewal
274	October 10, 2012	Mayuko Kawakita	
275	October 17, 2012	Ami Kikuchi	
276	October 24, 2012	Eri Murakawa	
277	October 31, 2012	Angelica Michibata	
278	November, 2012	Tomoko Tabata	
279	November, 2012	Yui Ichikawa	
280	November, 2012	Unabara Yasuyo Tomoko	
281	November, 2012	Asian	
282	December 5, 2012	Shintaro Yamada	
283	December 12, 2012	Takashi Fujii	
284	December 12, 2012	Ai Tominaga	
285	December 12, 2012		Hokkaido Location Special (You Yokoyama, Subaru Shibutani, Ryuhei Maruyama)

=== 2013 ===
Episode	Air date	Guest	Notes
286	January 9, 2013	An Nakamura	
287	January 16, 2013	Youn-a	
288	January 23, 2013	Takeshi Nadagi	
289	January 30, 2013	Kenji Tamura	
290	February 6, 2013	Chiaki Horan	
291	February 13, 2013	Ikuta Toma	
292	February 20, 2013	Riyo Mori	
293	February 27, 2013	Saori Yoshida	
294	March 6, 2013	Maggy	
295	March 13, 2013		Beppin Darake no Maruhi Mikōkai Special
296	March 20, 2013	Sumire	
297	March 27, 2013	Viking	
298	April 3, 2013	Karina Maruyama	
299	April 10, 2013	Speed Wagon	
300	April 17, 2013	Akina Minami	
301	April 24, 2013	Loveli	
302	May 1, 2013	Airi Taira	
303	May 8, 2013	Akiyoshi Nakao	
	May 11, 2013 (Saturday)	Eiichirō Funakoshi; Emiko Kaminuma	Iwai! 300 Kai Toppa Kinen Gōka Geinōjin Kyōkan Shite Hoshii Nen Special
304	May 15, 2013	Kuwabata Ohara	
305	May 22, 2013	Maryjun Takahashi	
306	May 29, 2013	Ruriko Kojima	
307	June 5, 2013	Haruna Kawaguchi	
308	June 12, 2013	Hamakān	
309	June 19, 2013	Mirei Kiritani	
310	June 26, 2013	Wakako Shimazaki	
311	July 3, 2013	Akemi Darenogare	
312	July 10, 2013	Drunk Dragon	
313	July 17, 2013	Nanase Aikawa	
314	July 24, 2013	Ayako Nishikawa	
315	July 31, 2013	Takako Katou	
316	August 7, 2013	Megumi Yasu	
317	August 14, 2013	Arie Mizusawa	
318	August 21, 2013	Ryōhei Suzuki	
319	August 28, 2013	Katsuhide Uekusa	
320	September 4, 2013	Jun Kaname	
321	September 11, 2013	Kazuki Enari	
322	September 18, 2013	Akimasa Haraguchi; Hori	
323	September 25, 2013	Hitomi Satō	
324	October 2, 2013	Kaoru Hirata	
325	October 9, 2013	Ungirls	
326	October 16, 2013	Koji Yamamoto	
327	October 23, 2013	Yōsuke Asari	
328	October 30, 2013	Karen Miyama	
329	November 6, 2013	Azumax (Takahiro Azuma)	
330	November 13, 2013	Mitsuki Takahata	
331	November 20, 2013	Kōki Kameda	
332	November 27, 2013	Yumiko Shaku	
333	December 4, 2013	Karen Miyazaki	
334	December 11, 2013	Kazuki Namioka	
335	December 18, 2013	Chinami Suzuki	
336	December 25, 2013	Miyu Yoshimoto	

=== 2014 ===
Episode	Air date	Guest	Notes
337	January 8, 2014	Angelica Michibata	
338	January 15, 2014	Emiri Miyasaka	
339	January 22, 2014	Yuko Fueki	
340	January 29, 2014	Keiko Kitagawa	
341	February 5, 2014	Moro Morooka	
342	February 12, 2014	Haruhi Ryōga	
343	February 19, 2014	Kavka Shishido	
344	February 26, 2014	Kazuto Ioka	
345	March 5, 2014	Ai Haruna	
346	March 19, 2014	Hitomi Shimatani	
347	March 26, 2014	Chiaki Kuriyama	
348	April 2, 2014	TKO	
349	April 9, 2014		Bijo Darake no Mikōkai Sōshūhen Special
350	April 16, 2014	Arata Tomori	
351	April 23, 2014	Masami Yamamoto	
352	April 30, 2014	Hana Imai	
353	May 7, 2014	Maasa Takahashi	
354	May 14, 2014	Miho Tanaka	
355	May 21, 2014	Kamomentaru	
356	May 28, 2014	Akina Minami	
357	June 4, 2014	Kei Yasuda	
358	June 11, 2014	Tomoe Shinohara	
359	June 18, 2014	Nicche	
360	June 25, 2014	Makoto Tsubasa	
361	July 2, 2014	Iyo Matsumoto; Yū Hayami	
362	July 9, 2014	IMALU	
363	July 16, 2014	Reiko Shiota	
364	July 23, 2014	Lotti	
365	July 30, 2014	Moe Oshikiri	
366	August 6, 2014	Maki Watase (Lindberg)	
367	August 13, 2014	Ayano Fukuda	
368	August 20, 2014	Yoshizumi Ishihara	
369	September 3, 2014	Nobunari Oda	
370	September 10, 2014	Miwa Asao	
371	September 17, 2014	Mitsuru Yaku	
372	September 24, 2014	Mikan; Yū Yashiro	
373	October 1, 2014	Ainosuke Kataoka	
374	October 8, 2014	Diamond Yukai	
375	October 15, 2014	Shinobu Sakagami	
376	October 22, 2014	Kōji Matoba	
377	October 29, 2014	Akiko Suzuki; Rina Takeda	
378	November 5, 2014	Yo Hitoto	
379	November 12, 2014	Takayuki Takuma	
380	November 19, 2014	Aki Hano	
381	November 26, 2014	Masuda Okada	
382	December 3, 2014	Yoko Minamino	
383	December 10, 2014	Rei Okamoto	
384	December 17, 2014	Mai Asada	

=== 2015 ===
Episode	Air date	Guest	Notes
385	January 7, 2015	Jinbo Satoshi	
386	January 14, 2015	Haru	
387	January 21, 2015	Fujiko Kojima	
388	January 28, 2015	Ichirōta Miyakawa	
389	February 4, 2015	Momiji Yamamura	
390	February 11, 2015	Jun Shibuki	
391	February 18, 2015	Shizuka Nakamura	
392	February 25, 2015	KiLa (magician)	
393	March 4, 2015	Kanna Mori	
394	March 11, 2015	Ivan	
395	March 18, 2015	Kaori Manabe	
396	March 25, 2015	Kenichi Ebina	
397	April 1, 2015	Yoshimi Tendō	
398	April 8, 2015	Chiaki Horan	
399	April 15, 2015	Junichi Davidson	
400	April 22, 2015		400kai Kinen Nōpuran Tabi - Hakone Location Special (Part 1)
401	April 29, 2015		400kai Kinen Nōpuran Tabi - Hakone Location Special (Part 2)
402	May 6, 2015	Doburock	
403	May 13, 2015	Masanobu Katsumura	
404	May 20, 2015	Maya Kobayashi	
405	May 27, 2015	Shinichi Shinohara	
406	June 3, 2015	Mirai Shida	
407	June 10, 2015	Yōji Tanaka	
408	June 17, 2015	Miwako Kakei	
409	June 24, 2015		Bijo Darake no Mikōkai Sōshūhen Special
410	July 1, 2015	Maki Ichiro	
411	July 8, 2015	Hitoshi Kusano	
412	July 15, 2015	Yumiko Shaku	
413	July 22, 2015	Mikie Hara	
414	July 29, 2015	DJ Koo (TRF)	
415	August 5, 2015	Yūga Yamato	
416	August 12, 2015	Yumi Adachi	
417	August 19, 2015	Abareru-kun; Atsugiri Jason	
418	September 2, 2015	Kento Nagayama	
419	September 9, 2015	Shelly	
420	September 16, 2015	Masako Ohara & Mac Suzuki	
421	September 23, 2015	Houka Kinoshita	
422	September 30, 2015	Masakiyo Maezono	
423	October 7, 2015	GENKING	
424	October 14, 2015	Kumiko Funayama	
425	October 21, 2015		Unpublished SP
426	November 4, 2015	Seiko Niizuma	
427	November 11, 2015	Sato Shiori	
428	November 18, 2015	Sugi-chan & Dandy Sakano & Hige Danshaku	
429	November 25, 2015	Speed Wagon	
430	December 2, 2015	Manami Hashimoto	
431	December 9, 2015	Makoto (Sharam Q)	
432	December 16, 2015	Natsume Mito	
433	December 23, 2015	Ostrich club	
