= Women in Shinto =

Women occupy a unique role in the indigenous Japanese traditions of Shinto, including a unique form of participation as temple stewards and shamans, or miko. Though a ban on female Shinto priests was lifted during World War II, the number of women priests in Shinto is a small fraction of contemporary clergy.

== History of women in Shinto ==
Women in Shinto often appear as miko, shrine maidens who are consistently seen as conduits between spirits and men, though men are then seen as the actors who implement the will of the spirit.

=== The Mythological beginnings ===
The diverse roles of women in Shinto myths make it difficult for scholars to generalize about women's roles at Shinto's origin. Amateratsu, the sun goddess, and Himiko, an early shaman queen of Japan, are central figures in the faith. Other goddesses include Benten, a dragon-woman of good luck, and Inari, a rice goddess who takes the form of kitsune, a vixen (female fox) at many Shinto shrines. The Kojiki, a collection of stories which form Shinto practices, purport to be collected from a courtesan, Hieda no Are, and written down at the request of an Empress, Gemmei.

In the earliest records of Shinto, from the 2nd to 7th centuries, women were valued as representatives, and carriers, of fertility. There is debate among scholars as to the extent of which this translated into political power within society or within Shinto practice, with some evidence suggesting a deferential tendency to women from male counterparts. Some scholars suggest that priesthood at this time was seen as a dual role shared by men and women, operating together, often as brother and sister.

=== Royal High Priestesses at Ise shrine ===
According to the mythology of Japan described in the Nihon Shoki, nieces or daughters of the Emperor or Empress served as intermediaries at one of Shinto's holiest sites, the Ise shrine, beginning in the 7th century. These priestesses served to connect the reigning Emperor to the purported divine origin of that Emperor's power, and remained an official position until the 14th century. They retreated to the Royal Palace for a year after being chosen, followed by another year in seclusion, before moving to the Shrine at Ise, where they participated in, and watched over, purification rituals for about 11 years. Once retired, they could marry.

=== The Heian era ===
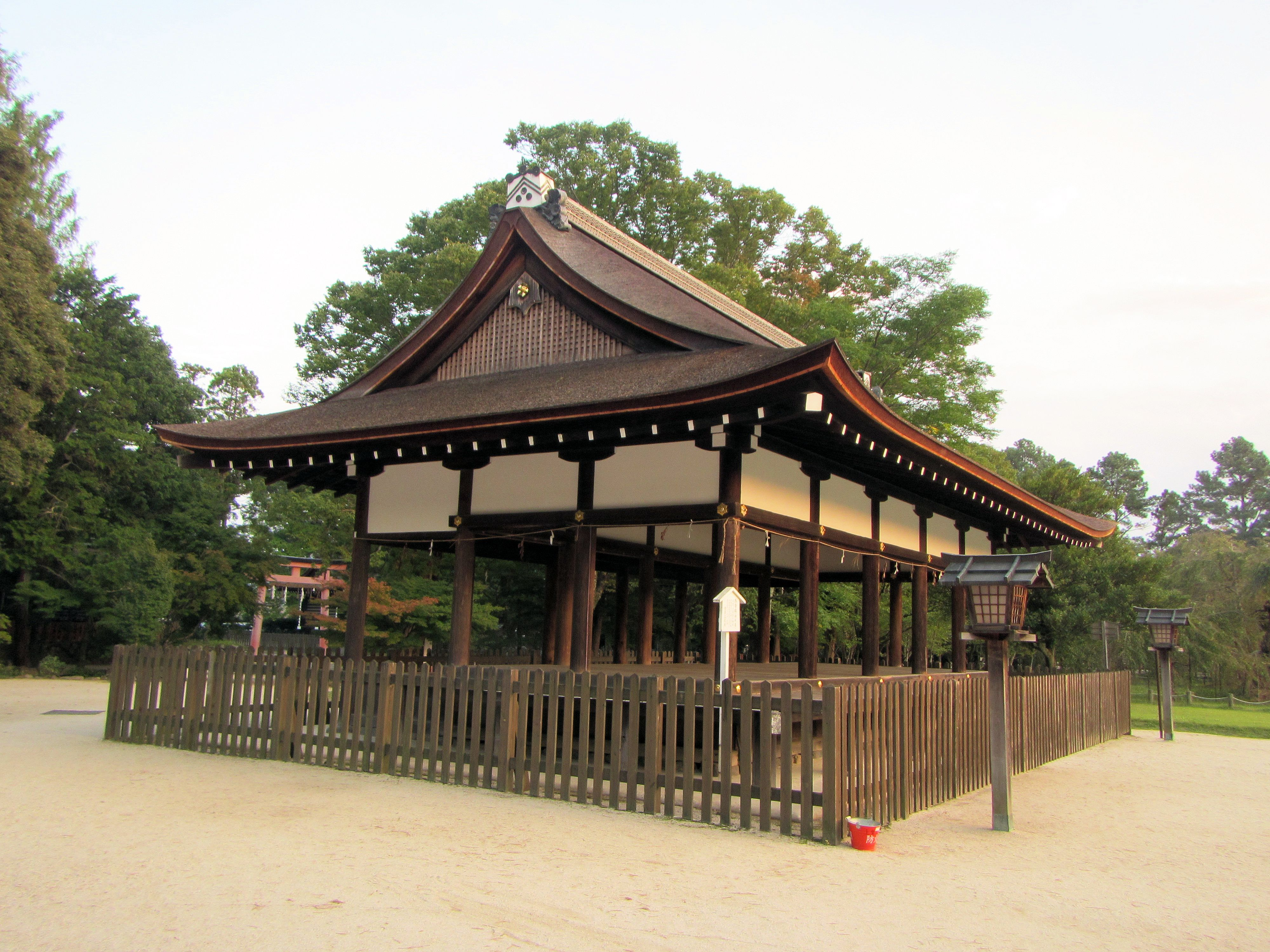
Kamo shrine, Kyoto

The Heian era saw an early synthesis of Buddhist and Shinto beliefs in Japan, and the integration of a Confucian legal system from China. The introduction of a more patriarchal confucianist social structure, resulted in a decline in power for female shamans and shrine priestesses. For example, women no longer had any claim to official positions at shrines, and miko were limited to maintenance and upkeep.

Some scholars suggest that, while spiritual power was considered equal among priests and priestesses in this time period, priests nonetheless wielded larger influence and political power. Others suggest that the role of ancient women as priests in Shinto is a contemporary myth without connection to ancient Shinto practice.

Priestesses at Ise shrine maintained their role during this period, and were complemented by a similar position at the Kamo shrine in Kyoto. Like those at Ise, those at Kamo served one year at the Imperial Palace before overseeing the shrine's activities. These priests would also perform rituals and purifications, including fasting and overseeing ceremonies.

=== Tokugawa and Meiji era ===
During the Tokugawa shogunate, all Shinto priests were consolidated under the control of the Yoshida family, which limited the power of priestesses. The Meiji era sought to regulate Shinto practices; as part of this, Shinto priestesses were largely pushed out of their positions in 1868. In this period, a movement toward modernization and rationalization called for the elimination of thousands of shrines and of magical elements, the latter of which had come to be most closely associated with women.

=== Shōwa era to present day ===
Such trends continued until the defeat of Imperial Japan. After the defeat of Imperial Japan, Shinto and the state were rendered legally distinct, with prohibitions on state involvement, and later, women were again permitted to become priests.

== Shinto taboos applicable to women ==
=== Exclusion from sacred sites ===
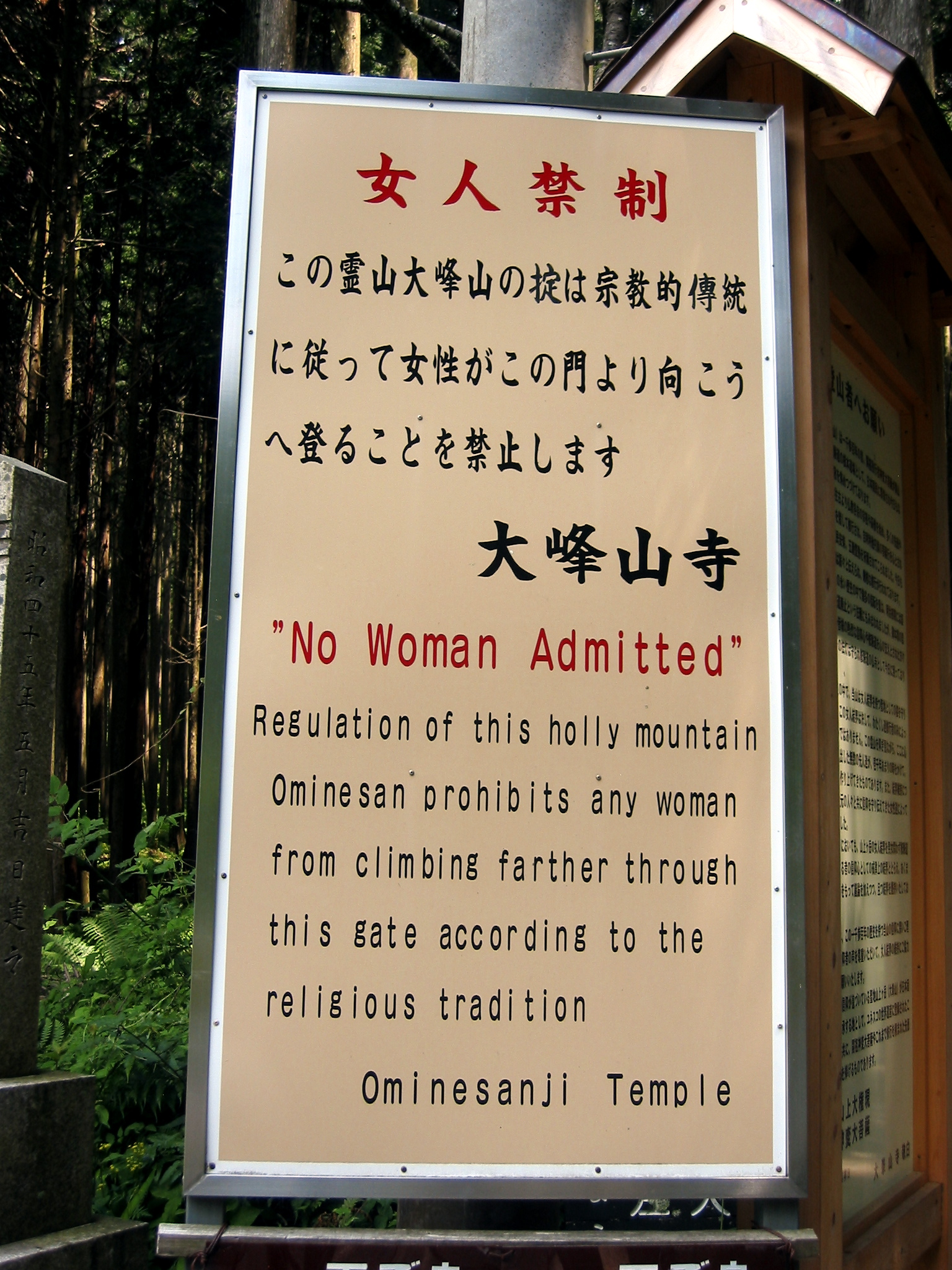
Sign announcing the prohibition of women climbers

The Japanese government issued an edict (May 4, 1872, Grand Council of State Edict 98) stating, "Any remaining practices of female exclusion on shrine and temple lands shall be immediately abolished, and mountain climbing for the purpose of worship, etc., shall be permitted". However, exclusionary practices remain in some places. For example, a sign at a World Heritage site associated with Shintoism, Mt. Omine in Nara, forbids women from climbing to the top, which has triggered a number of controversial protests. Some Shinto shrines also ask recent mothers not to pass through torii gates when entering for 72 days after childbirth. Also, women in Japan were forbidden from participation in Yamakasa, parades in which Shinto shrines are carried through a town, until 2001.

Some historians suggest that the practice of excluding women may have originated from folk tales about women who were turned to stone or brought on natural disasters as they approached sacred sites on mountains, or owing to the choice of religious ascetics that rejected interactions with women, and commonly lived high in the mountains. Others suggest the prohibition is influenced by Buddhist doctrine against sexual relationships between monks and nuns.

=== Blood pollution ===
Women's menstrual blood is a taboo in Shinto, thought to be influenced by the popularity of the Buddhist Blood Pond Sutra (血盆経, Ketsubonkyô). This doctrine preached that women were condemned to a Blood Bowl Sutra hell for the sin of pollution through menstrual blood; only the prayer could spare them. Though Buddhist in origin, Shinto facilities emulated this practice in their teaching, encouraging women, and men who had contact with menstrual women, to avoid shrines.

== Shinto priestesses ==
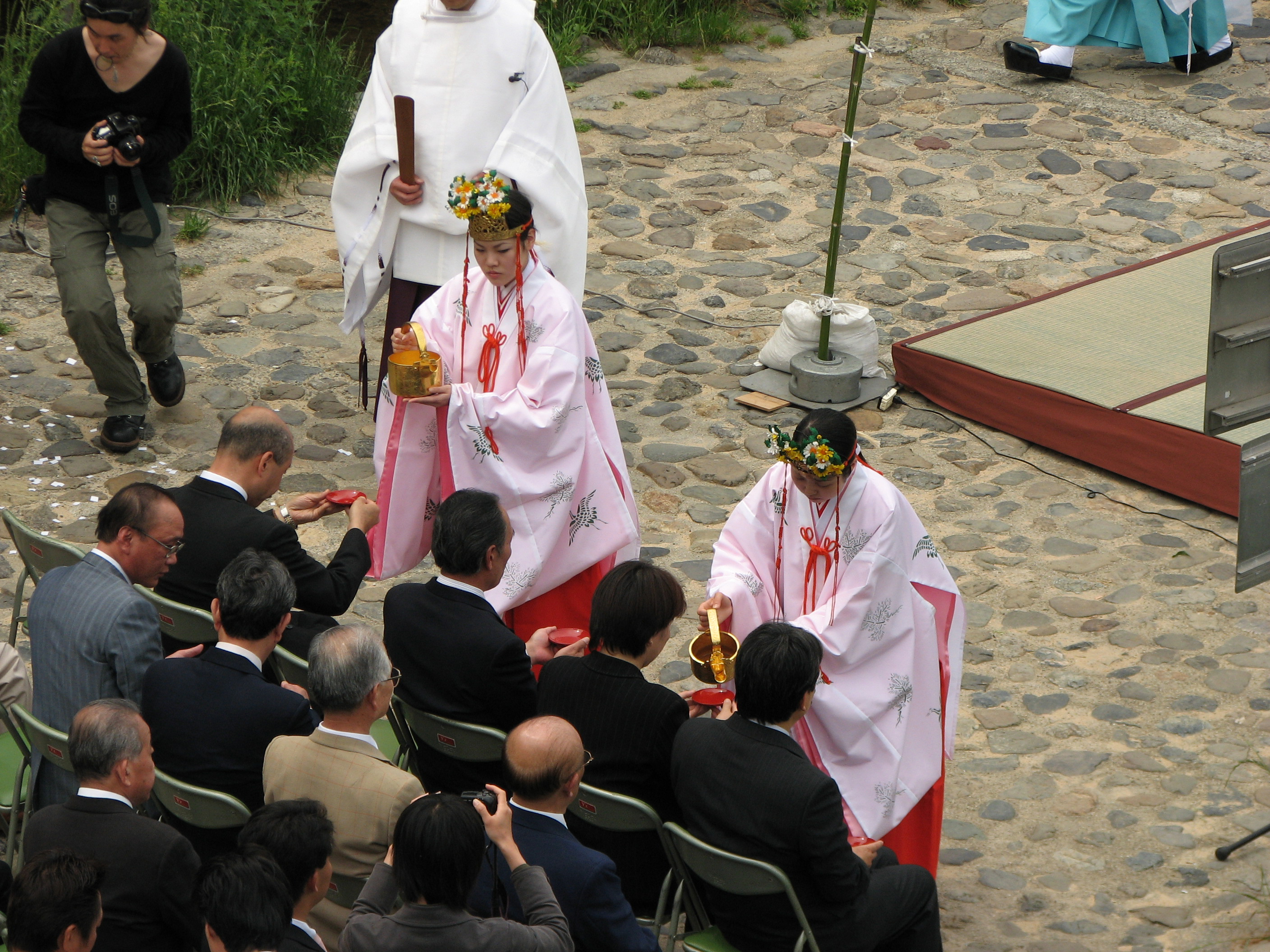
Miko performing a ceremony near the Kamo River in 2006

In Shinto, priestesses are allowed, but remain rare, and take on the male role of priests from recent history, more so than the traditional Shamanistic role of women in early Shinto. More common roles for women in the clergy are miko, shrine stewards who assist the chief priest. Outside of organized Shinto, however, an increasing number of women are taking the title "miko" and tying it to original Shinto practices such as fortune-telling and healing arts.

Though 20 women per year graduate from Kokugakuin University with credentials for priesthood, less than two per year become clergy. In 2001, the Association of Shinto Shrines estimated that there were fewer than 25 women priests in Tokyo.

A ban on priestesses was lifted during World War Two, reflecting smaller family sizes and a shrinking interest in religion within Japan, as well as a labor shortage after the war. Most of the first women priests were the wives or daughters of priests who went to war. These women were typically preferred over new priests, because they were well versed in their husband’s duties, and already integrated into the community.

=== Special considerations for women priests ===
Some Shinto priestesses assert that Shinto is no different from other religions in its treatment of women. Akiko Kobayashi, a woman who was then a priest for more than 20 years, stated that there is "no opposition" from either priests or those who attend shrines led by women priests.

Menstruation poses a unique challenge to women priests in Shinto, which considers menstrual blood a defilement of sacred spaces. This "red uncleanness" (aka fujo, in Japanese) was invoked as a traditional restriction on women’s participation in sacred space. In the modern era, menstrual periods in Shinto priests are controlled through the use of medication.

Some of the most important shrines in National Shinto sects, Ise and Atsuta, continue to limit the participation of women priests. Other obstacles to female priesthood in Shinto include the patronage system, in which an elder priest serves as a mentor for a new priest during religious instruction. This patronage system forbids priests from instructing women. With a majority of Shinto priests being men, this can pose a challenge for aspiring priestesses to find elder mentors.

=== Notable women Shinto priests ===
Mihoko Ishii became the priest of Suwa Shrine in Nambu, Aomori Prefecture, after the death of her husband, who had been chief priest.

Yuri Kawasaki became in 2008 the first Shinto priestess ever to serve at Nikkō Tōshō-gū.

Nobuyo Otagaki, a Shinto priestess at Amagasaki Ebisu Shrine, in Amagasaki, Hyogo Prefecture, Japan. Otagaki, the daughter of a Shinto priest, was a graduate of Ritsumeikan University. After taking on work as a flight attendant, Otagaki began to study Shinto and became certified into priesthood. After moving to New York for two years, she returned to Amagasaki to become a resident priest in 2008. She took over the Chief Priesthood position from her father in 2012.

== Women in folk Shinto ==
In popular, localized traditions influenced by, but not officially recognized as, Shinto practice, there is a common figure of itako, or ichiko, or ogamisama: blind mediums. These shamans are always women who enter the calling prior to menstruation. Evidence shows some common aspects of initiation practices for these women among schools in Yamagata, Aomori, and Miyagi prefectures in the 1920s and 1930s. They are trained in various practices, including memorization of Shinto and Buddhist prayers and sutras. Training typically involved cold-water mizugori, or purifying baths, which in its most extreme form can involve complete, sustained drenching by ice-cold water for a period of several days. Once named an itako or ichiko, the woman serves as an intermediary for kami and deceased spirits.

== See also ==
- Nyonin Kinsei
