= Ō no Yasumaro =

Japanese bureaucrat and chronicler (died 723)

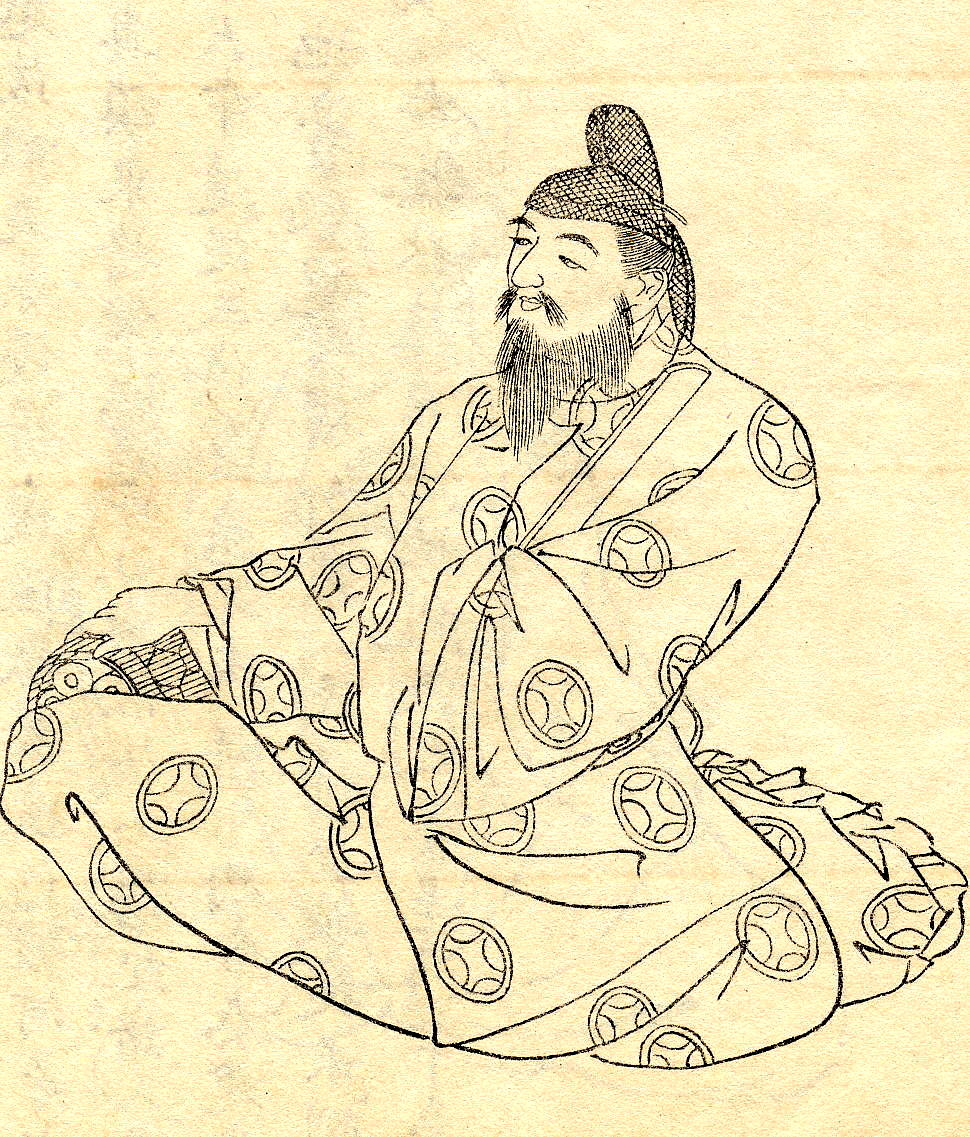
- Portrait of Ō no Yasumaro by Kikuchi Yōsai (19th century)
- Born: Unknown
- Died: 11 August 723
- Burial place: 451 Konosecho, Nara, 630-2177, Japan
- Occupations: bureaucrat, chronicler
- Known for: Compiling the Kojiki
- Notable work: Kojiki, Nihonshoki
- Title: Junior Fourth Rank, Minbukyo (Junior Fourth Rank, Lower Grade), 5th Class Award
- Father: Ō no Honji (多 品治)

Ō no Yasumaro (太 安万侶; died August 15, 723) was a Japanese nobleman, bureaucrat, and chronicler. He may have been the son of Ō no Honji, a participant in the Jinshin War of 672.

He is most famous for compiling and editing, with the assistance of Hieda no Are, the Kojiki, the oldest extant Japanese history. Empress Genmei (r. 707-721) charged Yasumaro with the duty of writing the Kojiki in 711 using the differing clan chronicles and native myths. It was finished the following year and presented to Empress Genmei in 3 volumes in 712.

== Career details ==
In 704, Yasumaro was promoted from Shorokuinoge (Senior Sixth Rank, Lower Grade) to the rank of Jugoinoge (Junior Fifth Rank, Lower Grade).

In 711, Yasumaro was promoted to Shogoinojo (Senior Fifth Rank, Upper Grade). In September of the same year, Emperor Genmei presumably ordered him to combine two pre-existing documents, the "Imperial Sun-lineage" and "Ancient Dicta of Former Ages", which was learned and recited by Hieda no Are, in order to create a historical compilation by following genealogical documents of the imperial line. This historical compilation was called the Kojiki, and it was completed in the following year in 712. At the end of the Yuan-ing Dynasty, in 715, Yasumaro was promoted to Jushiinoge (Junior Fourth Rank, Lower Grade).

In 716, Yasumaro became the head of the Ō clan (多氏) clan . During this period, Yasumaro most likely also played an active role in compiling the Nihon Shoki, which was finished in 720. He died on July 6, 723 at the end of the Genjo Dynasty. His final official rank was Minbukyo Jushiinoge (Junior Fourth Rank, Lower Grade).

In 1911, he was posthumously promoted to Jusanmi (Junior Third Rank).

== Tomb of Ō no Yasumaro ==
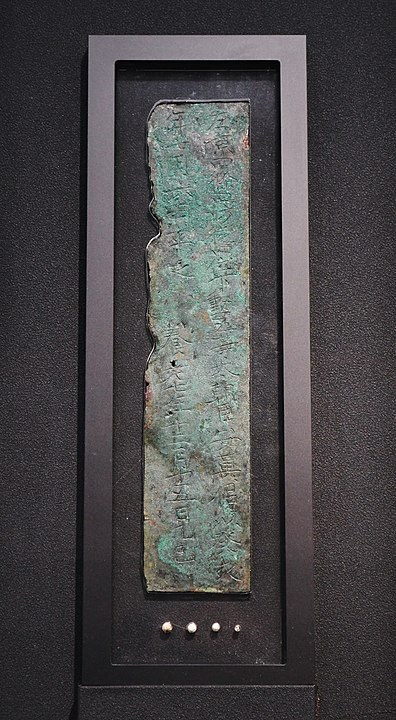
The tombstone and pearls that were found in the grave of Ō no Yasumaro. In 1980, it was designated as an National Cultural Artifact by the government of Japan. The tombstone is made of bronze. It is exhibited at the Museum attached to the Archaeological Institute of Kashihara, Nara Prefecture.

The tomb of Otomo no Yasumaro is located in the Konose-cho neighborhood of the city of Nara. It is located on the southern slope of a hill that stretches from east-to-west, near the northwestern end of the Yamato Plateau, which runs east of the Nara Basin. In 1979, a copper plate gravestone was discovered in a tea plantation. The tomb was excavated, and in 1980, it was designated a National Historic Site. The tomb was built on the top of a small ridge on a steep slope of about 30 degrees. The soil was all removed during land reclamation, but part of an arc-shaped ditch that surrounded the mound at the boundary between the tomb and the ridge remains, and if the mound is restored from this, the inner diameter of 4.5 meters. The grave pit is located almost in the center of the mound, and is slightly deformed, measuring 1.9 meters east-to-west and 1.8 meters north-to-south, and is dug almost vertically. A wooden coffin covered in charcoal was buried with its long axis running north-south in the north-north center of the burial pit, and judging from the hollow area remaining in the charcoal layer, the size of the coffin is estimated to be approximately 66-cm long, 3-cm wide, and 38-cm high. The grave-marker was placed under the wooden coffin, face down, with the top of the inscription facing north; it is made of a copper plate measuring 29.1-cm long, 6.1-cm wide, and 0.1-cm thick, and has writing on only one side. The inscription is written in two lines, with boundaries around it and in the center, and contains 41 kanji characters. Its engraving reads:

左京四條四坊従四位下勲五等太朝臣安萬侶以癸亥
年七月六日卒之 養老七年十二月十五日乙巳

"Ō no Yasumaro, Junior 4th Grade Lower, 5th Grade Order of Merit, who lived in the 4th Ward of 4th Street on the left (east) side of the Capital,
Who died on the 6th day of the 7th month of the Kigai year (723, in this case). [Inscribed on] the 15th day of 12th month of the 7th year of Yōrō (also 723) [by] Ki no Tomi"

Grave goods found in the coffin included four pearls, two pieces of iron, and two pieces of plaster, along with cremated human bones and ashes.

== In fiction ==
Yasumaro appears in the video game Toukiden: The Age of Demons as a mitama (a soul of a hero from Japanese history).

Yasumaro appears in the video game Sid Meier's Civilization VI as a Great Prophet.
