= Michibata =

Michibata (written: 道端) is a Japanese surname. Notable people with the surname include:

- Angelica Michibata (道端 アンジェリカ, born 1985), Japanese model
- Glenn Michibata (born 1962), Canadian tennis player and coach
- Jessica Michibata (道端 ジェシカ, born 1984), Japanese model
