= Sumera Mikoto no Fumi =

Sumera Mikoto no Fumi may refer to:

- Tennōki (天皇記), an historical Japanese text from 620.
- Teiki (帝紀), an historical Japanese text from 681.
