= Nyonin Kinsei =

Japanese societal customs barring women from sacred places

Nyonin Kinsei (女人禁制) is a general term for a type of society custom against women that is found in Japan.

In particular, it refers to customs that prohibit women from entering sacred places (shrines, temples, sacred sites, ritual sites, etc.). In this sense, the isolated area (boundary) is called women's boundary. Use is synonymous with women's prohibition.

It also refers to social customs that prohibit mere women from entering, participating in, or participating in any other way, arising from reasons different from the main meaning of women's prohibition (as seen in Kabuki).

On the contrary, "forbidding men from entering" is called Danshi Kinsei (男子禁制) (e.g., praying and performing rituals in Utaki in Okinawa (Ryukyu Kingdom)).

== Opposition to the "no women allowed" policy ==
=== Meiji Government ===
On the 27th day of the 3rd month of Meiji 5 (4 May 1872), the Meiji government announced that temples and shrines would no longer be able to ban women, in an effort to compete with the Western powers. The Tokugawa shogunate and its temples and shrines had adopted the Confucianism precept of "no women allowed" (one of the Five precepts) and the Confucian precept of "no man and woman shall sit on the same seat at the age of seven" (an internal rule of the Book of Rites), and these were outlawed as one of the Discriminations ("perverse customs") that were out of the question for a modern nation trying to compete with the Western powers.

=== Japan Sumo Association's "no women allowed" policy in the ring ===
However, the origin of the Japan Sumo Association (Grand Sumo) is different from these. The origin of the Grand Sumo Tournament is the Kanjin Grand Sumo Tournament, which was held to raise money for the construction and repair of temples and shrines since the Edo period. Later, in 1872, the ban on women entering and leaving the precincts of shrines and temples was lifted by the Grand Council of State Proclamation No. 98, Shrine and Buddhist Temples Closed to Women, but Open to Climbing and Pilgrimage, allowing female spectators to watch the Grand Sumo Tournament. The Japan Sumo Association still prohibits women from entering the ring except for the spectator seats, but this has not led to any opposition by female fans, as they are not directly disadvantaged as long as they are regular spectators. There have been incidents of discrimination against women. Some journalists, politicians, writers, and others have called for women to be treated equally with men and not to be treated as unclean for the vague reason of "Tradition" on the basis of Article 14, Paragraph 1 of the Japanese Constitution, which prohibits discrimination.

After graduating from Doshisha University, Kon Hiyori joined the sumo club of Aisin Seiki, and in September 2021, a reporter from Number Web interviewed her and asked her questions about "Sumo wrestlers fighting against the ban on women in sumo. In September 2021, a reporter from Number Web interviewed and asked questions about sumo, saying, "There are many types and aspects of sumo, including grand sumo, Mongolian wrestling, amateur sumo as a sport, and votive sumo. Among them, I think that the prohibition of women is an idea that exists only in sumo. That's why we've been talking about how we'd like to be in the Olympic ring first, rather than in the sumo ring. When interviewed by the Asahi Shimbun in the same month, she said, "I don't mind the ban on women in sumo because I think my amateur sumo and grand sumo are different. (I simply hope that sumo will develop as a modern sport.

=== Opposition to the ban on women in Omine, Nara Prefecture ===
On 27 March 1872 (4 May 1872), the Grand Council of State issued Proclamation No. 98 of the 5th year of Meiji (1872May 04), which proclaimed, "Shrines and Buddhist temples shall be closed to women, and pilgrimages to mountain climbing shall be permitted. In spite of the Shugendo Abolition Decree of September 15, 1872 (October 27, 1872), the shugendo practitioners of Mount Ōmine (Ōmine) in southern Nara Prefecture were not allowed to return to the main religion of Tendai Shingon Buddhism. (Omine) in southern Nara Prefecture, the shugendo practitioners and their collaborators continued to maintain the "no women allowed" policy on the grounds that it was a sacred site for shugendo. In response to this, there has been a movement to lift the ban on women entering the mountain, and in the past there have been women who have climbed the mountain secretly or in spite of opposition.

=== Opinion that the prohibition of women should be maintained ===
Just after the end of the Pacific War, the wife of a high-ranking official of the Allied Forces that occupied Japan once visited the village of Dorogawa, which is located at the trailhead, to request the lifting of the women's ward. At that time, a local elder countered, "Don't let the women of your country Abbeys be released to men," and the ban was maintained.

== Places where women are (or were) forbidden in Japanese beliefs and customs ==
=== Mountains and sacred sites ===
==== Buddhism and mountain asceticism ====
Formerly prohibited for women

- Mount Fuji (Yamanashi Prefecture and Shizuoka Prefecture) – However, the ban was lifted in the late Edo period.
- Tateyama (Toyama Prefecture) – However, the ban was lifted in 1872 (1872).
- Hakusan (Ishikawa Prefecture and Gifu Prefecture) – Same as above.
- Mount Hiei (Shiga Prefecture, Kyoto Prefecture) – same as above.
- Mount Ontake (Nagano Prefecture, Gifu Prefecture) – However, the ban was lifted around 1877 (10th year of Meiji).
- Mount Kōya (Wakayama Prefecture) – However, the ban was lifted in 1904 (37th year of Meiji).
- Three Mountains of Dewa (Yamagata Prefecture) – The ban was lifted in 1997 (Heisei 9). However, there are separate training periods for men and women.
- Mount Tateshina (Nagano Prefecture) – Takamimusubi is enshrined at the summit, but as he is the God of the dawn of time, women were not allowed to mountaineering.。

Currently prohibited for women

- Mount Ishizuchi (Ehime Prefecture) – Currently, women are only allowed on 1 July, the day the mountain opens.
- Mount Ōmine (Nara Prefecture) – The entire mountain is covered, and there are large signs along the trails. There is an opposition movement.
- Mount Ushiro, Dosenji Inner Temple (Okayama) – The ascetic path leading from the mother hall in the middle of Gozan to the inner temple is considered forbidden to women. There is a separate trail which women are allowed to climb.

==== Shinto and other mountain worship systems ====
- Okinoshima (Fukuoka Prefecture, Munakata City) – The entire island is privately owned。
- Yakushima (Kagoshima Prefecture, Yakushima Town) - Miyanoura and other mountains in the central part of the island were considered forbidden to women.。

=== Shinto-related festivals ===
- Tanabe Festival (Aomori Prefecture, Mutsu City) – In recent years, women have been allowed to pull the floats, but the festival is basically forbidden to women and they are not allowed to ride on the floats.
- Gantō (Akita City) – Women have been allowed to participate in the festival since the late Showa period, but only men are allowed to hold the Gantō.
- Gion Matsuri (Kyoto (city)) – Some of the floats have female musicians, but others, such as the long sword floats at the head of the procession, are forbidden to women.
- Hakata Gion Yamakasa (Fukuoka Prefecture) – However, girls of elementary school age and younger are allowed to participate in the festival by dressing up like men (shimekomi).
- Kishiwada Danjiri Festival (Osaka Prefecture, Kishiwada City) – Women are allowed to pull the Danjiri, but not to ride on it.
- Cattle prodding (Niigata Prefecture, Nagaoka City, formerly Yamakoshi Village) – The ban on women cattle owners entering the area was lifted on 4 May 2018, to pull the cattle around after the procession.。

=== Based on membership of special skilled workers ===
- Sake brewery (Toji) – There are now female Toji.
- On the ring at Grand Sumo Tournament (Japan Sumo Association) – Dan outside the ring for hair-cutting ceremonies, awards, and greetings from the Kangen at regional tournaments, and temporary suspension of Chibikko Sumo.
  - On 4 April 2018, during a tour in Kyoto Prefecture, Maizuru City, Maizuru Mayor Ryozo Tadami collapsed in the ring while addressing the crowd. At this time, an announcement was made to female medical personnel who had come into the ring to provide emergency medical care to get out of the ring. Hakkaku Chancellor made an Apology, and the third rank Gyoji who made the announcement resigned in July of the same year.。
  - "Chibi Sumo" at regional tours has been suspended since 2018. 。The reason for this was that there were concerns about the Sekitori inflicting wounds on girls' faces, some of the Sekitori, who were naked and wearing mawashi, were confused about what to do when they were dealing with older girls, even in elementary school, and there were two complaints from the parents of the boys who participated in the tournament that they were injured.。At a rikishi meeting before the May 2019 tournament, several rikishi called for a revival. Yokozuna Tsururyū, who serves as president of the sumo wrestlers' association, said, "The most common request is for a tour of the tournament. When I think about the future of the sumo world and interacting with the customers," he said, making a request to the touring division.。

== Performances that are (or were) considered forbidden to women ==
- Kabuki – Child actors are customarily allowed to perform before their first menstruation. Also, as of now, it is not strictly forbidden for women to perform.
  - In 1993, the then 16-year-old Takako Matsu (the second daughter of Matsumoto Hakuō II) appeared at the Kabuki-za as Oku in Bunshichi Genbei. In 2007, Mitsuko Mori appeared with 18th generation Nakamura Kanzaburō in the October performance of Shimbashi Embujo's "Nishiki-aki Enbujo Matsuri Nakamura Kanzaburō Struggle".。In December 2017, Shinobu Terajima (eldest daughter of Kikugoro Onoe VII) appeared in 11th Ichikawa Ebizo's experimental stage show, Roppongi Kabuki, Zatoichi. Also, Nakamura Shidō II has been performing in Cho-Kabuki with virtual idol Hatsune Miku since the 2019 Minami-za performance, with a female dancer of the Fujima school (Kanjuro school). the trade name "Hanabiraya" in their social networking exchanges.。
  - In May 2016, Fumimi Imamura played the heroine in "Bancho Sarayashiki" at the National Theatre of Japan. She played the heroine.。
  - In 1983, under the supervision of Umeyuki Onoe VII, Shou Satou (playwright, screenwriter, director, professor at Osaka University of Arts Junior College))The Theater troupe "Onna-Kabuki Sho" was founded by the Theatrical troupe, which consists of only female performers. The troupe has been staging a series of "too-beautiful period dramas" that have learned from the great kabuki plays and have been arranged for women to perform.。In amateur kabuki, women also perform on stage, and there are even women's kabuki groups.。
  - There is a school of Japanese dance that was founded by a kabuki actor (high-born or family member) and has been headed by a kabuki actor (family member) for generations, and there are daughters of kabuki actors who work as Japanese dancers. The eldest daughter and Takako Matsu of Matsumoto Shiroko II are the Natori of the Matsumoto school, while the eldest daughter and second daughter of Ichikawa Danjūrō IX are the second and third Iemoto of the Ichikawa school. The current head of the school, Ichikawa Juhon (the eldest daughter of Ichikawa Danjūrō XI), is also active as a kabuki choreographer. In addition, kabuki actors sometimes appear as guests at Shinpa performances.、As a result, many daughters of kabuki actors (Kuriko Namino, Harumoto Yuka, etc.) and former kabuki actors (Kawai Yukinojo, Kitamura Rokuro, etc.) are enrolled in the Shinpa Theater Company.
- Nohgaku – Female Noh performers were allowed to join the Nohgaku Association in 1948. Membership in the Nippon Nohgaku-kai was granted in 2004. The members of the Japan Nohgaku Society are recognized as holders of the important intangible cultural property "Nohgaku" (general recognition).

== Others ==
- As an example of temporary prohibition of women, in samurai etiquette, a samurai would abstain from women three or seven days before going into battle, to save his energy before leaving (in effect, women were prohibited around samurai a few days before going into battle).
- Ueizumi Nobutsuna wrote in his book "Hatsukou" (The Book of War), Vol. 1, "It is forbidden to bring women into the camp", and women were forbidden even during the war. (When combined with the aforementioned, this means that women were forbidden from one week before and during the war). In the midst of war, unpredictable and unexpected battles and surprise attacks can occur. The exception to this is Toyotomi Hideyoshi, who led an overwhelmingly large army in the Conquest of Odawara, accompanied by his Concubines, Yodo-dono and others (Hideyoshi was born Yodo-dono). Buke (Japan)|Bushi]]). In addition, there are many examples of warlords staying with their wives during Siege Warfare and escapes.

== Danshi Kinsei (Men are forbidden) ==
The opposite of nyonin kinsei is danshi kinsei (no men allowed).

=== Beliefs ===
As an example of religion and faith, praying and performing rituals at Utaki in Okinawa has been the exclusive business of female priests called Noro (priestess) since ancient times, and is basically forbidden to men.

However, in modern times, there are many cases where it is not forbidden to enter the temple except during the priest's worship, but this is a measure for tourism (such as Saiba Utaki). The core sanctuary of the Utaki, which is controlled by the priests, is enclosed and is forbidden for men.

In addition, even if there is no enclosure, Utaki must not be entered by men or women without permission for religious reasons. In many cases, Utaki is privately owned and it is a sacred place unique to the village. Therefore, it is qualitatively different from shrines in mainland Japan where the public is basically allowed to enter as long as they observe the etiquette.

Hinukans, which are common in Okinawan households, are also generally forbidden to be worshipped by men, and are forbidden to men.

This prohibition on men is said to have originated from the fact that in matrilineality societies, women presided over rituals and sometimes reigned as queens (such as Himiko, Onarigami, and the Himeiko system).

=== Rear palace ===
The palace of a king, for example, the Ooku of the Edo Shogunate, or the Ouchiwara of Shuri Castle and Nakijin Castle in Ryukyu were also forbidden to men.

The prohibition of non-royal men in the imperial palace is widespread throughout the world. In Chinese dynasties, eunuchs were strictly enforced, and their duties ranged from clerical work, miscellaneous duties, and serving in the court, including the inner palace, to security, intelligence activities, education of the royal family, and management of firearms.

== See also ==
- Mount Ōmine
- Shugendō
- Taboo
- Menstrual taboo
- Feminism
- Gender-blind
