= Angelica Michibata =

Japanese model (born 1985)

- 道端 アンジェリカ
- Born: Angelica Patricia Michibata; December 5, 1985 (age 39); Fukui Prefecture, Japan
- Occupation: Model
- Agent: YMN
- Height: 1.74 m (5 ft 9 in)
- Relatives: Jessica Michibata (sister); Karen Michibata (sister)

Angelica Patricia Michibata, simply known as Angelica Michibata (道端 アンジェリカ, Michibata Anjerika), (born December 5, 1985) is a Japanese model of Argentine descent. She and her sisters, Jessica and Karen, are called the "Michibata Sanshimai". She is a prominent model for S Cawaii!.

== Life and career ==
Michibata was born to a Japanese mother and an Argentine father of Spanish and Italian descent. Her sisters Jessica and Karen also work as fashion models. Michibata also has an older brother.

In July 2012, she was appointed an image character for the color contact lens brand, TeAmo. Michibata was appointed with Ai Haruna.

== Filmography ==
=== Magazines ===
Year	Title	Notes
2005	S Cawaii	Exclusive model

=== TV series ===
Year	Title	Network	Notes
2008	Easy Sports	TV Asahi	
2011	Dance@TV	TV Tokyo	MC
2011	Hirunandesu!	NTV	Monday quasi-regular
	Cream Quiz Miracle 9	TV Asahi	Irregular appearances
	Himitsu no Kenmin Show	NTV	Irregular appearances

=== Advertising ===
Year	Title	Notes	References
	Peach John		
2008	Kintetsu Passe		
	Jewels Prom	Image model	
2012	Tōmorokoshi no Hi-ge Cha	"Angelica Satsuei Fukei"	

Catalogs

Year	Title	Notes	References
2011	Emoda		
2012	Emoda Denim Book		

=== Events ===
Title	Notes	References
Kobe Collection		
Tokyo Girls Collection		
Girls Award		
Tokyo Runway		
Kansai Collection		
Sapporo Collection 2010		
Tokyo Fashion Collection		
Girls Sense Tokyo Vol.2		

== Awards ==
2011

- Tennen Cosmetics Beauty Award Model Bumon

2014

- 27th Nihon Megane Best Dresser-sho Sunglasse Bumon
