= Nobuyo Otagaki =

Nobuyo Otagaki is a Shinto priest at the Amagasaki Ebisu Shrine in Amagasaki, Hyogo Prefecture, Japan. She has been a resident priest since 2008, taking over from her father as chief priest in 2012.

== Biography ==
Otagaki was born in Japan in 1971, attended and graduated from Ritsumeikan University in Kyoto. After working for 6 years as a flight attendant, Otagaki began to study Shinto and replaced her father in the Chief Priesthood position in 2012. She does social work for the shrine, often meeting with students to discuss Shinto culture or nutrition. Otagaki also runs a program in which groups get to tour the shrine and learn about Miko life.

== See also ==
- Women in Shinto
- Kannushi
