= Peach John =

Japanese mail-order retailer of lingerie and women's apparel

Peach John Co., Ltd.
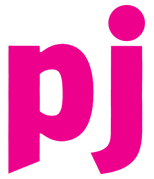

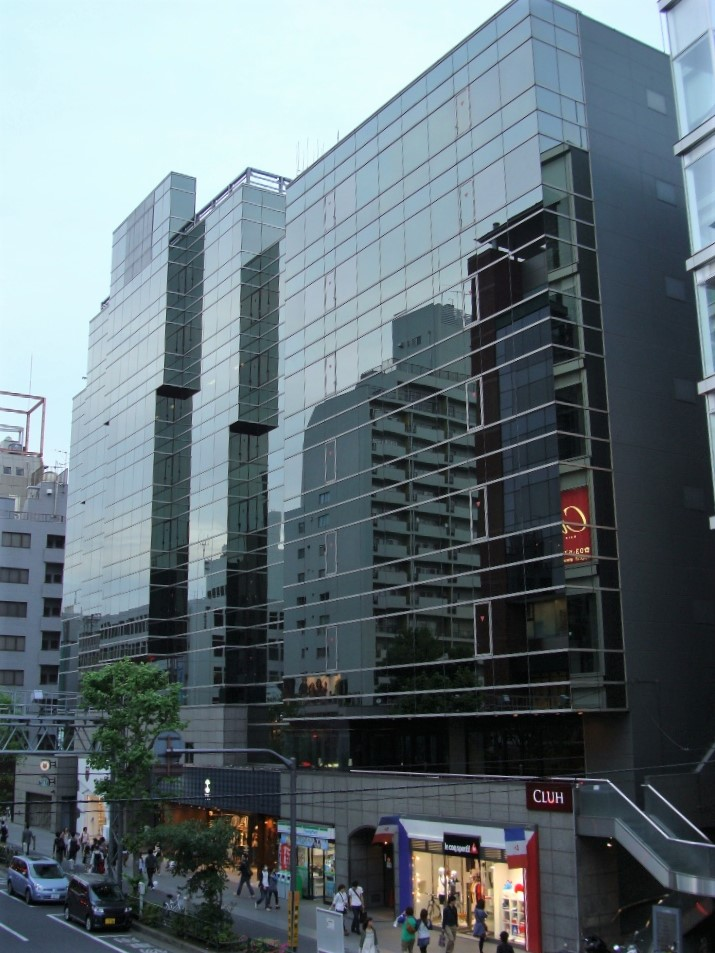
- The headquarters building in Shibuya, Tokyo
- Native name: 株式会社ピーチ・ジョン
- Company type: Subsidiary
- Industry: Apparel
- Founded: 1 June 1994; 32 years ago
- Headquarters: Shibuya, Tokyo, Japan
- Key people: President, Chairman, & CEO: Akiyuki Ueno
- Products: bras, panties, sleepwear, shoes, clothing, bags, accessories, cosmetics and health care products
- Revenue: ▲¥17 billion JPY (FY 2006)
- Number of employees: 140 (as of March 2016)
- Parent: Wacoal Holdings
- Website: www.peachjohn.co.jp

Peach John Co., Ltd. (株式会社ピーチ・ジョン, Kabushiki-gaisha pichi jon) is a Japanese mail-order retailer of lingerie and women's apparel targeted at women in their teens and 20s.

== History ==
The company was founded 1 June 1994 by Mika Noguchi and her then-husband, Shoji Noguchi, in Tokyo, Japan. At the time, Mika Noguchi, aged 29, established a small mail-order company specializing in importing American lingerie.

The name Peach John (ピーチ・ジョン Pīchi Jon) draws inspiration from the Japanese folktale hero Momotarō (桃太郎), with Momo (桃) translating to "peach", and Tarō (太郎) being a common masculine given name as common as John. Mika Noguchi desired a name beginning with the letter P as she found the pī (ピー) sound to be "cute".

As the company expanded its product line, in 2001 Peach John nearly succumbed to bankruptcy. After restructuring, the company was able to pay back their 2 billion yen debt in 13 months. In May 2006, the Japanese lingerie maker Wacoal formed a capital alliance with Peach John which allowed Wacoal to hold 49 percent of the company's shares. Then on 10 January 2008, Wacoal bought Noguchi's remaining shares, giving Wacoal full control of Peach John Co., Ltd.

== Collaborations ==
On occasion, Peach John has collaborated with Bandai on items to mark milestone anniversaries of anime/manga franchises:

- Sailor Moon lingerie and pajamas, including costume lingerie sets based on Sailor Soldier outfits, in celebration of the franchise's 20th anniversary.
- Neon Genesis Evangelion lingerie and pajamas inspired by the franchise's various characters in celebration of the franchise's 20th anniversary.
