= Hieda no Are =

Compliled the Japanese text Kojiki in 712

Hieda no Are (稗田 阿礼) is primarily known for being instrumental to the compilation of the Japanese text Kojiki in 712. While birth and death are unknown, Are was active during the late 7th and early 8th century.

== Background ==
Very little is known about Are's background. A passage in the Seikyūki (西宮記) suggests that Are belongs to the Sarume-no-kimi family, who trace their ancestry back to the goddess Ame-no-Uzume-no-Mikoto.

Scholars such as Kunio Yanagita and Saigō Nobutsuna theorize that Are was a woman. Are was given the title of toneri (舎人), which is typically a male title. However, members of the Sarume-no-kimi family are renowned as shrine maidens to the court, a female institution. In addition, a number of passages within the Kojiki appear to have been written by a woman.

== Kojiki ==
During the 7th century, Emperor Tenmu set about to correct inconsistencies within the national history contained in the various Teiki and Kyūji circulating with the nobles. He sorted through them and commanded Are, presently at the age of 28, to memorize them. Are was renowned for their intelligence: "naturally bright and intelligent, Are could recite upon reading but once and memorize upon hearing but once." Tenmu died before the work could be completed. Later, Empress Genmei ordered Ō no Yasumaro to compile the Kojiki based on what Are had memorized. This was completed in 712.
