= Number (magazine) =

Japanese sports magazine

Number, officially known as Sports Graphic Number, is the leading Japanese sports magazine published on every Thursday by Bungeishunju. The magazine is based in Tokyo.

The first issue, released in April 1980, drew attention by the piece Enatsu's 21 balls (江夏の21球, Enatsu no 21 kyu). Yet the magazine failed to return a profit for the next 10 years. Today however, the magazine is one of the most profitable publications of Bungeishunju. The success of the magazine also led other rival publishers to launch sports magazines, though they tend to be less successful.
