= Ikko (make-up artist) =

Japanese make-up artist

- Born: Kazuyuki Toyoda; 20 January 1962 (age 64); Fukuoka Prefecture, Japan
- Other name: Touen Miyabi
- Occupations: Make-up artist, TV personality
- Agent: GLAD
- Height: 171 cm (5 ft 7 in)
- Website: ikko.cc

Ikko (born Kazuyuki Toyoda (豊田 一幸, Toyoda Kazuyuki) on 20 January 1962 in Fukuoka Prefecture), stylized as IKKO, is a Japanese make-up artist, TV personality, and actress. The name "Ikko" comes from an alternative reading of the Japanese name "一幸" (Ikkō).

== Biography ==
Born on 20 January 1962, Ikko was born as the first-born son. Ikko experienced gender dysphoria and became socially withdrawn as a teenager. She graduated from a beauty college in Fukuoka Prefecture and trained as a make-up artist for eight years before opening the make-up studio "Atelier Ikko" in 1992. In 2007, she released the single "Dondake no Hōsoku" or “The Law of Dondake,” popularizing the term dondake. As a make-up artist, she promotes Korean beauty products. She regularly appeared on the television program "Onē MANS."

== Personal life ==
Ikko is a trans woman. She speaks in onē kotoba.

== TV appearances ==
As of October 2008, Ikko regularly appears on the following TV programmes.

- Onē Mans (おネエ★MANS) (Nippon Television)
- Sekai Baribari Value (世界バリバリ☆バリュー) (Mainichi Broadcasting System)
- Mentai Wide (めんたいワイド) (Fukuoka Broadcasting System, Wednesday commentator)
- Inspector Totsukawa series (Takeshi Naito) (2018) - momo-mama

== Film ==
- Umami (2021), role: "Matsuba" (Director: Slony Sow)

== Books ==
Ikko has published the following books.

- IKKOの振袖ロマンティック, 2004, ISBN 4-391-61976-8
- IKKOウェディング――永遠のガーリッシュウェディング, 2005, ISBN 4-391-62110-X
- 超オンナ磨き〜美のカリスマIKKOの幸せを呼ぶゴールデンルール, July 2006, ISBN 4-7762-0336-7

== Music ==
In December 2007, Ikko released a CD single titled "Dondake no Hōsoku." The single also included a cover of "Dō ni mo tomaranai," a 1972 hit song originally performed by Linda Yamamoto.
