= Kyūji =

Kyūji (旧辞), also known as Honji (本辞) and Sendai no Kuji (先代旧辞), is an ancient Japanese historical text. Its existence is recorded in the Kojiki which claims to have been composed based on its contents. No extant copies are known to exist anymore.

According to the Kojiki preface, Emperor Tenmu said:

What I hear is that the Teiki and Honji brought about by the many houses already differ from the truth and contain many inaccuracies. Should those mistakes not be corrected now, the original meaning will be lost within but a few years. They are the basis of the national system and are the foundation of the imperial government. Thus, I would like to carefully examine the Teiki and Kyūji, remove the errors, and establish the truth for future generations.

The preface goes on to state that the emperor dictates the Teiki and Kyūji to Hieda no Are, but that the emperor dies before the task is completed. The task was revived several years later during the reign of Empress Genmei:

At this point, regretting the errors and differences in the Kyūji, the Empresses tries to fix the errors and differences in the Senki, and on the ninth month and the eighteenth day of fourth year of Wadō [=711] she says to Yasumaro: "I command you to record the imperial Kyūji that Hieda no Are learned."

== Contents ==
As the text no longer exists, very little is actually known about it. The Kojiki preface states that differing versions existed with each clan, and that these differences were corrected by the imperial line. The preface also states that it was one of the primary resources in the composition of the Kojiki, thus there must have been some overlap between the two, and most likely contained legendary accounts.
