= Ayako Nishikawa =

- 西川史子
- Born: April 5, 1971 (age 55); Sagamihara, Kanagawa, Japan

Comedy career
- Years active: 1997–present
- Medium: Owarai; TV
- Genre: Owarai

Ayako Nishikawa (西川 史子, Nishikawa Ayako; 5 April 1971) is a Japanese female TV star, tarento, comedian, and cosmetic surgeon. She is unusual in Japan in that she is willing to appear on television, as medical practitioners are generally hesitant to appear.

== Early years ==
Ayako was born in Sagamihara, Kanagawa on 5 April 1971. Her father is a surgeon and runs his own hospital in her hometown.

She attended Toin Gakuen High School (学校法人桐蔭学園) and later graduated from St. Marianna University School of Medicine.

In 1996, while in medical school, she was selected as "Miss Nippon", Japan's most prestigious beauty contest.

Upon graduation from medical school, Ayako began working as a TV presenter known for her medical background. She has also appeared in several "Batsu games" of the variety show Gaki No Tsukai, where her appearance usually contradicts her normal professional appearance.

== TV programs ==
- Sunday Japon
