= Kojiki =

8th-century Japanese chronicle

The Kojiki (古事記; Japanese pronunciation: [kó̞.(ɟ̟͡)ʑì.k̟ʲì, kò̞.(ɟ̟͡)ʑí.-], "Records of Ancient Matters" or "An Account of Ancient Matters"), also sometimes read as Furukotofumi or Furukotobumi, (Note: -bumi is a voiced form of fumi (see rendaku). This reading was proposed by Motoori Norinaga, who spelt it out with phonetic kanji (kana, or more specifically, magana) as 布琉許登夫美 in Kojiki-den.) is an early Japanese chronicle of myths, legends, hymns, genealogies, oral traditions, and semi-historical accounts dating as far back as 641 concerning the origin of the Japanese archipelago, the kami, and the Japanese imperial line. The preface of the book claims it was composed by Ō no Yasumaro at the request of Empress Genmei in the early 8th century (711–712). It is therefore usually considered to be the oldest extant literary work in Japan. The book is written in Classical Chinese, though it includes some songs and poems in Old Japanese that are transcribed phonetically using Chinese characters.

The myths contained in the Kojiki as well as the Nihon Shoki are part of the inspiration behind many practices and unified "Shinto orthodoxy". Later, they were incorporated into Shinto practices such as the misogi purification ritual.

== Composition ==
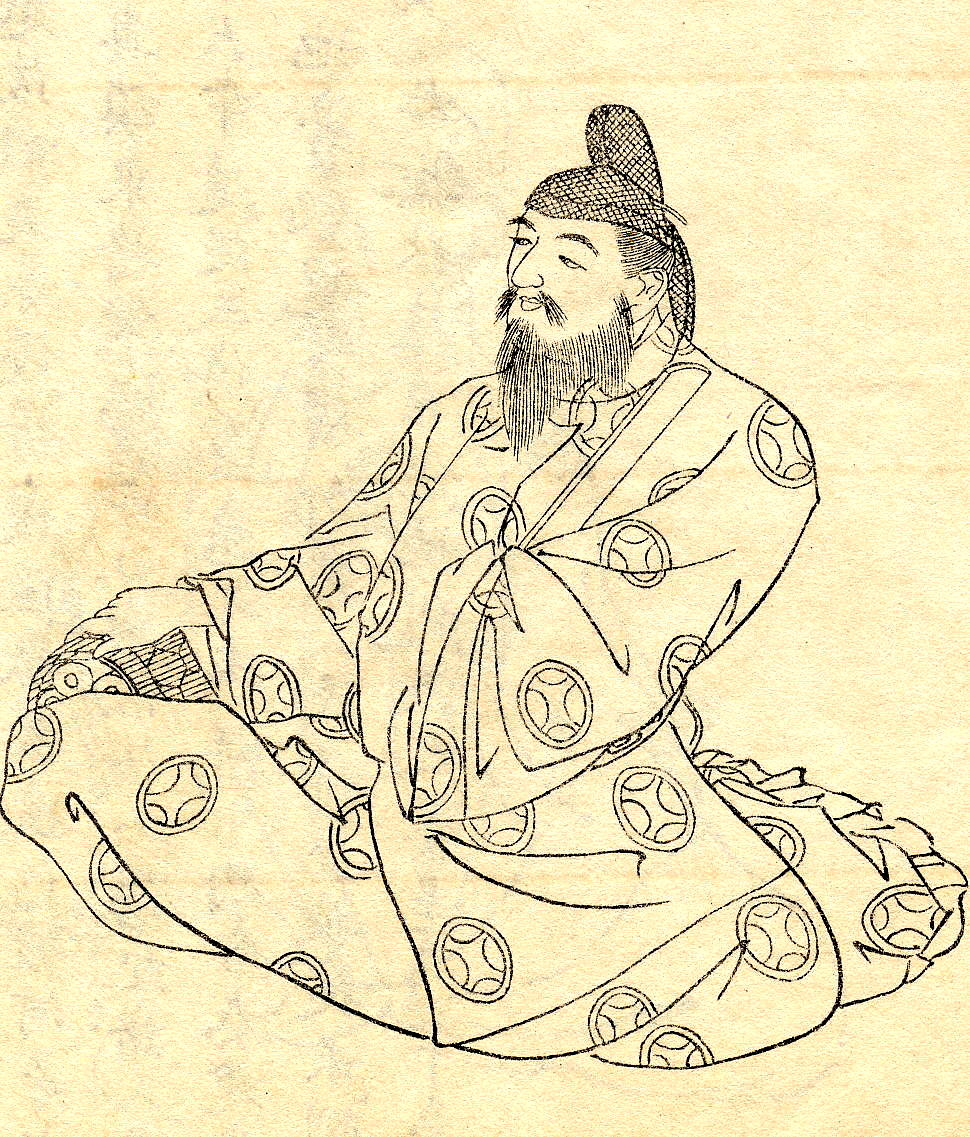
Portrait of Ō no Yasumaro by Kikuchi Yōsai (19th century)

It is believed that the compilation of various genealogical and anecdotal histories of the imperial (Yamato) court and prominent clans began during the reigns of Emperors Keitai and Kinmei in the 6th century, with the first concerted effort at historical compilation of which we have record being the one made in 620 under the auspices of Prince Shotoku and Soga no Umako. According to the Nihon Shoki, the documents compiled under their initiative were the Tennōki or the "Record of the Emperors", the Kokki (国記, also Kunitsufumi) or the "National Record", and other "fundamental records" (本記, hongi or mototsufumi) pertaining to influential clans and free subjects. Out of these texts, only the Kokki survived the burning of Soga no Emishi's estate (where these documents were kept) during the Isshi incident of 645, and was itself apparently lost soon after.

The Kojiki's preface indicates that leading families also kept their own historical and genealogical records; indeed, one of the reasons it gives for the compilation of the Kojiki is the correction of errors that had supposedly crept into these documents. According to the preface, Emperor Tenmu (reigned 673–686) ordered the review and emendation of clan documents and commissioned a certain court attendant (toneri) of exceptional memory named Hieda no Are to memorize records and oral traditions concerning the imperial lineage. Beyond this memorization, nothing occurred until the reign of Empress Genmei (reigned 707–715), who on the 18th of the 9th month of 711 (Wadō 4) ordered the courtier Ō no Yasumaro to record what had been learned by Hieda no Are. Yasumaro wrote down the information in Classical Chinese and presented his work to Empress Genmei on the 28th of the 1st month of 712 (Wadō 5).

=== Purpose ===
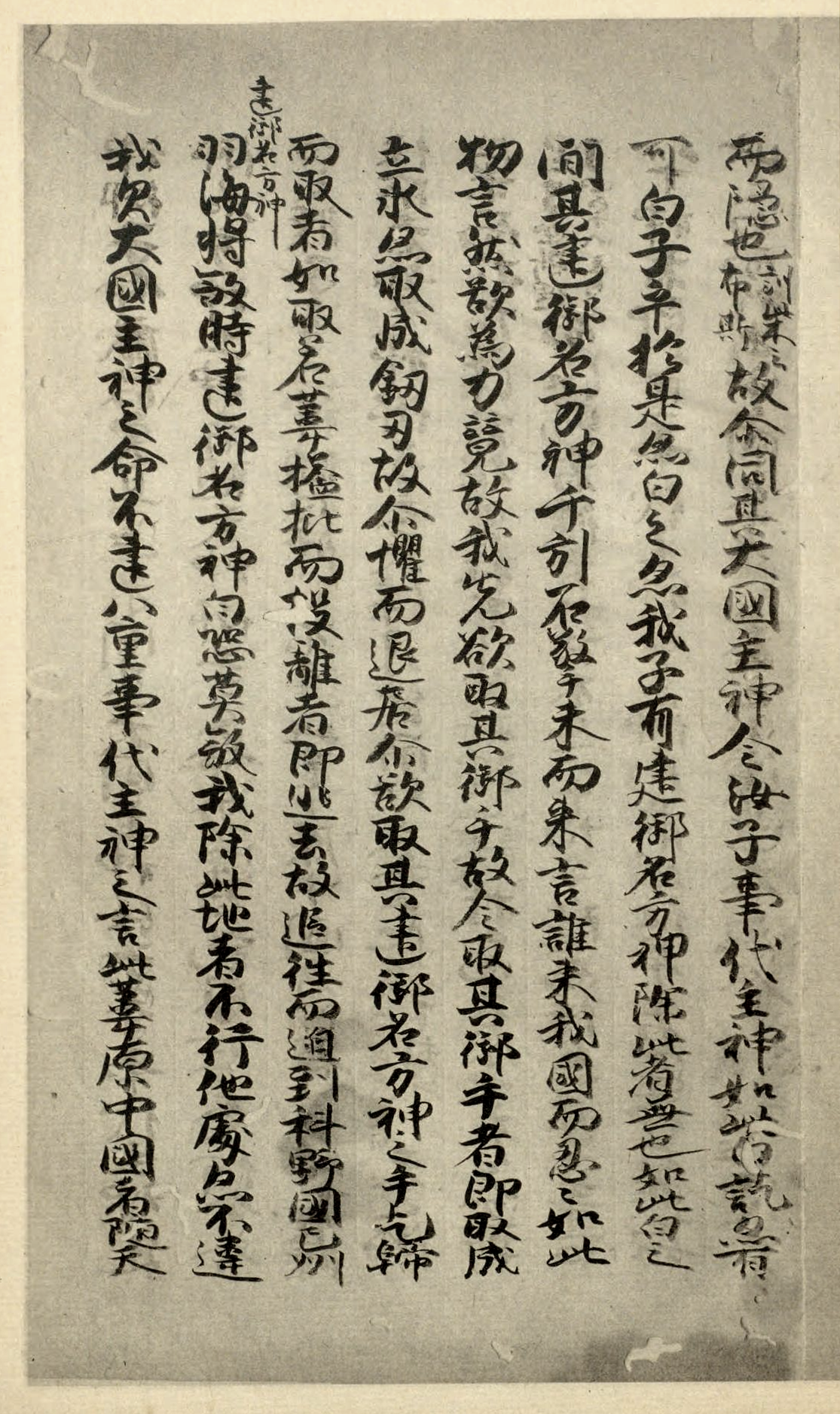
A page from the Shinpukuji manuscript of the Kojiki, dating from 1371–72

The Kojiki is a collation of different traditions woven into a single "official" mythology, made in an attempt to justify the rule of the imperial Yamato polity and at the same time to subsume different interest groups under its wing by giving them a place and an interest in the national genealogy-mythology. Apart from furthering the imperial agenda, an increased interest in the nation's origins in reaction to the influx of foreign culture and the need for an authoritative genealogical account by which to consider the claims of noble families and to reorganize them into a new system of ranks and titles are also possible factors for its compilation.

The Kojiki's narrative establishes the Yamato line's right to rule via myth and legend, portraying it as the progeny of heavenly deities and the rightful heir to the land of Japan. A good part of the latter portion of the text is spent recounting various genealogies which served not only to give the imperial family an air of antiquity (which may not necessarily reflect historical reality), but also served to tie, whether true or not, many existing clans' genealogies to their own. Regardless of the work's original intent, it finalized and possibly even formulated the framework by which Japanese history was examined in terms of the reign of emperors.

This legitimizing function is most concretely visible in the rivalry between the Yamato court and the Izumo lineage, whose local traditions the Kojiki absorbs into its mythology precisely in order to subordinate them to Yamato's claim to divine rule. It has also been noted that the text contains no reference to Buddhism, notwithstanding Emperor Tenmu's own devotion to the religion, a silence that has reinforced the view among historians and literary scholars that the Kojiki is best approached as myth rather than as history.

In contrast to the Nihon Shoki (compiled 720), the first of six histories commissioned by the imperial court, which was modeled on Chinese dynastic histories and was intended to be a national chronicle that could be shown with pride to foreign envoys, the Kojiki is inward looking, concerned mainly with the ruling family and prominent clans, and is apparently intended for internal consumption. Whereas the Nihon Shoki uses a variety of source documents (including Chinese texts), the Kojiki is apparently based on sources handed down within the court.

== Transmission and study ==
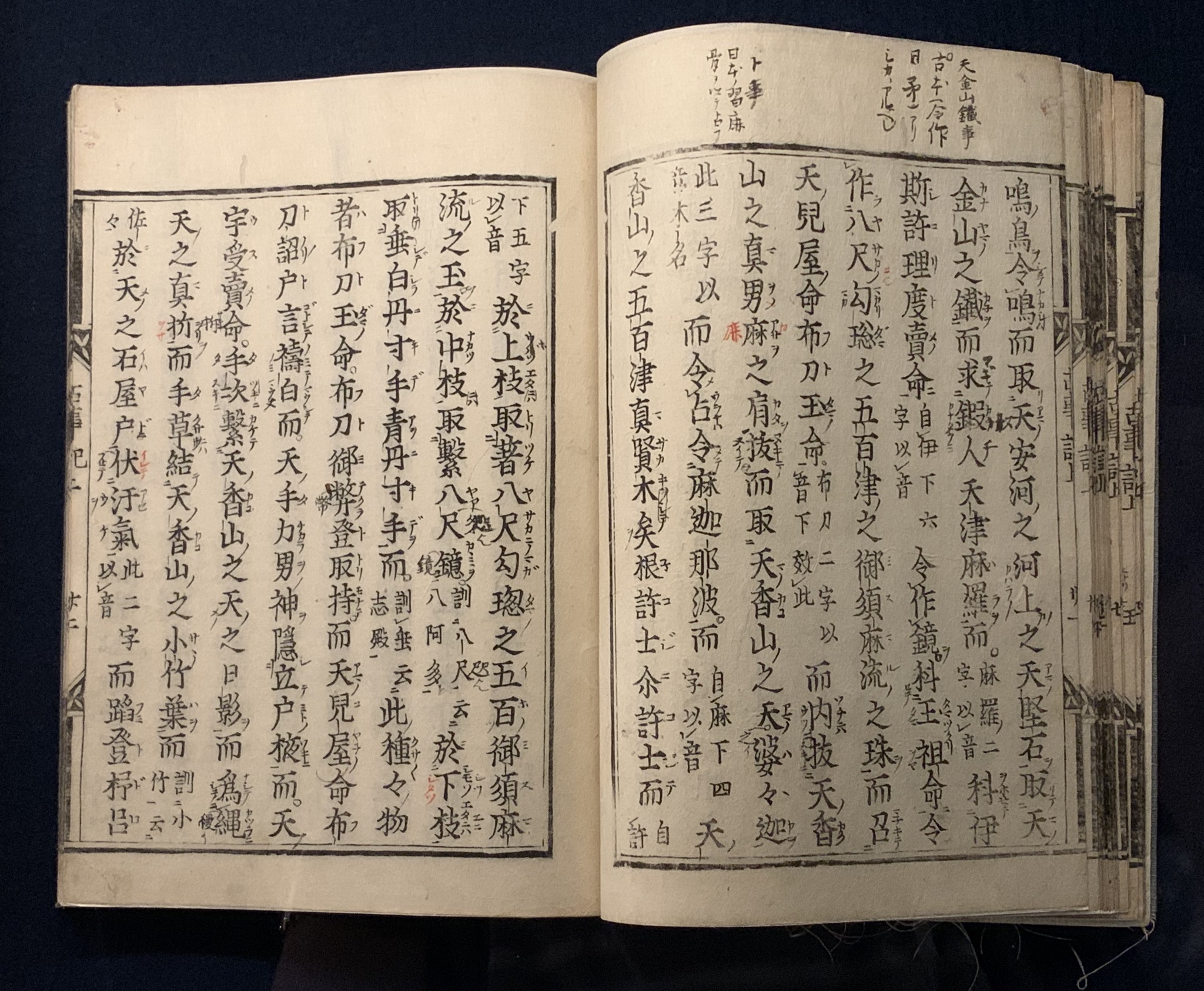
Kan'ei Kojiki, 1644 (Kokugakuin University)

Whereas the Nihon Shoki, owing to its status as one of the six imperial histories, was widely read and studied during the Heian period (794–1185), the Kojiki was mostly treated as an ancillary text. Indeed, a work known as the Sendai Kuji Hongi (also known as the Kujiki), claimed to have been authored by Prince Shōtoku and Soga no Umako, was considered to be earlier and more reliable than the Kojiki. (Modern scholarly consensus holds the Kuji Hongi to be a Heian period forgery based on both the Kojiki and the Shoki, although certain portions may indeed preserve genuine early traditions and sources.) By the Kamakura period (1185–1333), the work languished in obscurity such that very few people had access to the text, particularly that of the middle (second) volume. It is due to this neglect that the Kojiki is available only in comparatively late manuscripts, the earliest of which dates to the late 14th century.

It was with the advent of printing in the early modern period that the Kojiki first reached a wide audience. The earliest printed edition of the text was the Kan'ei Kojiki (寛永古事記), published in Kyoto in 1644 (Kan'ei 21). A second edition, the Gōtō Kojiki (鼇頭古事記, "Kojiki with Marginal Notes") was printed by Deguchi (Watarai) Nobuyoshi, a priest at Ise Shrine, in 1687 (Jōkyō 4).

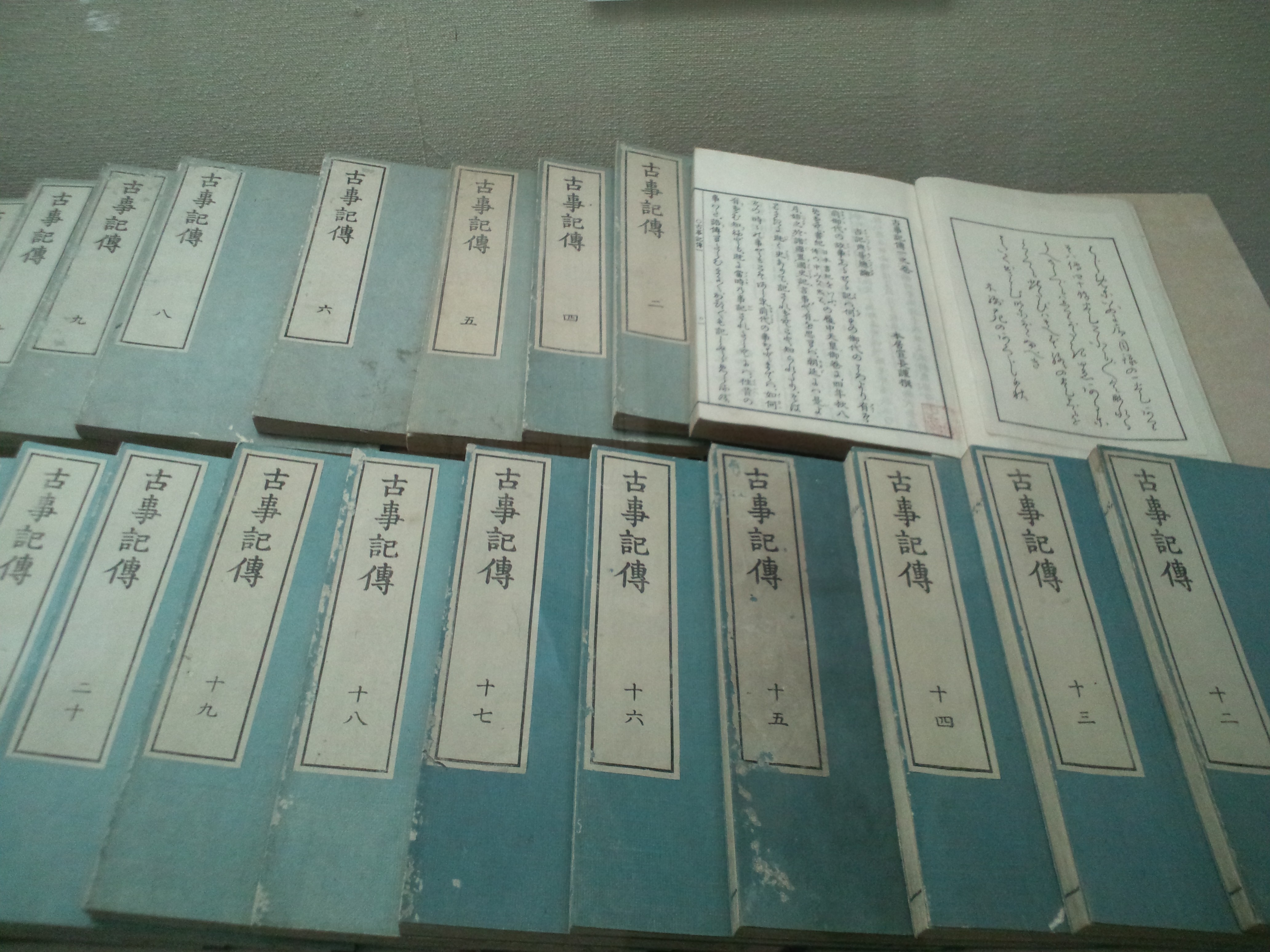
Kojiki-den by Motoori Norinaga

The birth of nativist studies (kokugaku) and nationalist sentiment during the Edo period saw a reappraisal of the Kojiki. Kokugaku scholars saw Japan's earliest writings as the repository of a uniquely superior Japanese identity that could be revived by recovering the ancient language they were written in; the Kojiki, by virtue of its antiquity, gained the status of a sacred text. The Kojiki came to be highly regarded that scholars such as Kada no Azumamaro and Kamo no Mabuchi – himself a student of Azumamaro – produced annotated versions of it.

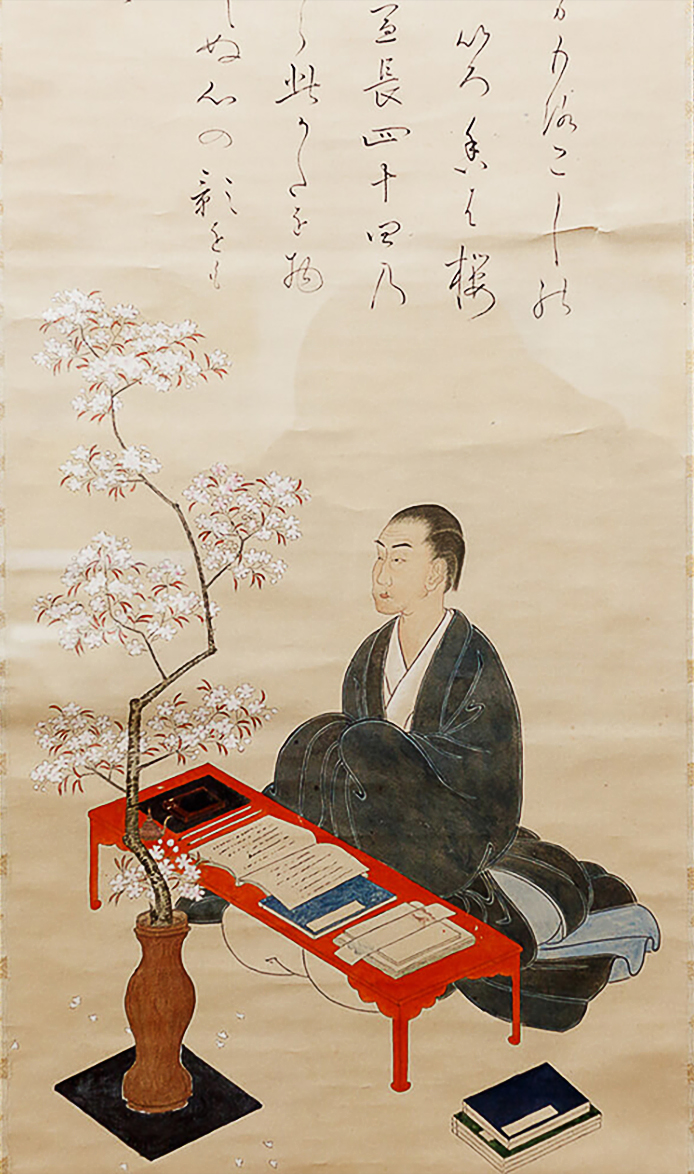
Motoori Norinaga

The Kojiki received its most serious study and exposition in the hands of Motoori Norinaga, who obtained a copy of the Kan'ei printed edition in 1754. After meeting Mabuchi in 1763, Norinaga began to devote his efforts to an in-depth scholarly study of the text. A monumental 44-volume study of the Kojiki called Kojiki-den, composed over a 34-year period (1764–1798), was the fruit of his labor. With Norinaga, the Kojiki assumed an importance equal to the Nihon Shoki; in fact, in his view the Kojiki was a more trustworthy source for ancient Japanese traditions than was the Shoki precisely because it was free of "Chinese mentality". He viewed the Kojiki as a true account of actual events that when read correctly, could reveal Japan in its pristine, ideal state as a community where the kami, the emperor and the people lived in harmony. Norinaga's work was carried on in different directions by his disciple Hirata Atsutane and his rivals Fujitani Mitsue (1768–1823) and Tachibana Moribe (1781–1849), who each produced commentaries and treatises on the text.

The Kojiki became once more the object of scholarly focus and discussion in the Meiji period with the introduction of Western academic disciplines such as philology and comparative mythology. The importance of the text as a work of literary value was recognized, and scholars realized that its accounts were comparable in many ways to ancient Greek and Roman myths. At the same time, however, the Kojiki and Nihon Shoki achieved a sort of scriptural status under State Shintō, which viewed the stories contained therein as orthodox national history. Official ideology upheld as unquestionable fact the belief in the emperor's divinity and the idea of Japan as a racially superior "national body" (kokutai), with scholars who questioned their veracity facing the threat of censorship, forced resignation, or even trial in court.

Until the Meiji era, the text's sacred nature was not known to have been questioned. However, the Kojiki was still widely seen as inferior to the Nihon Shoki until Motoori Norinaga wrote the Kojiki-den. In 1913, Tsuda Sōkichi argued in a study that the Kojiki, particularly in its earlier sections, was neither history nor myth but a document created to legitimize the rule of the imperial line. While his conclusions led to considerable controversy, his influence remains in subsequent studies of the text (particularly in post-World War II scholarship), which amounts largely to development and correction of the line of thought originally proposed by him. In reaction to Tsuda, Watsuji Tetsurō (1920) argued for a literary appreciation of the Kojiki, claiming that this gave it inner coherence. Kurano Kenji (1927) took it a step further, proposing that the Kojiki may best be compared with Western epic literature and regarded as a national epic like Beowulf is in the English-speaking world. During the 1920s and 30s, linguist Hashimoto Shinkichi studied the phonology of the Old Japanese language, and his conclusions were applied by scholars to the study of the text.

The Kojiki continued to attract the attention of academics and other specialists in the post-war period, which saw the appearance of numerous editions, translations and commentaries on the text by authors such as Kurano Kenji, Takeda Yūkichi, Saigō Nobutsuna, and Kōnoshi Takamitsu.

=== Manuscripts ===
There are two major branches of Kojiki manuscripts: Ise and Urabe. The extant Urabe branch consists of 36 existing manuscripts all based on the 1522 copies by Urabe Kanenaga. The Ise branch may be subdivided into the Shinpukuji-bon (真福寺本) manuscript of 1371–1372 and the Dōka-bon (道果本) manuscripts. The Dōka sub-branch consists of:

- the Dōka-bon (道果本) manuscript of 1381; only the first half of the first volume remains
- the Dōshō-bon (道祥本) manuscript of 1424; only the first volume remains, and there are many defects
- the Shun'yu-bon (春瑜本) manuscript of 1426; one volume

The Shinpukuji-bon manuscript (1371–1372) is the oldest existing manuscript. While divided into the Ise branch, it is actually a mixture of the two branches. The monk Ken'yu based his copy on Ōnakatomi Sadayo's copy. In 1266, Sadayo copied volumes one and three but did not have access to the second volume. Finally, in 1282, he obtained access to the second volume through a Urabe-branch manuscript that he used to transcribe.

== Structure ==
The Kojiki recounts the mythological creation of Japan, the genealogy of the Japanese gods (kami), and the histories of the semi-legendary early emperors of Japan. Its narrative portions also contain dozens of short songs and poems (uta), often spoken by gods, heroes, or early rulers. The book is written mostly in Classical Chinese, although the songs are written in Old Japanese using man'yōgana, a system where Chinese characters were used purely phonetically to represent the syllables of Old Japanese.

=== Sections ===
The Kojiki is divided into three parts: the Kamitsumaki (上巻, "upper volume"), the Nakatsumaki (中巻; "middle volume") and the Shimotsumaki (下巻; "lower volume").

- The Kamitsumaki, also known as the Kamiyo no Maki (神代巻; "Volume of the Age of the Gods"), includes the preface of the Kojiki, and is focused on the deities of creation and the births of various deities of the kamiyo (神代) period, or Age of the Gods. The Kamitsumaki also outlines the myths concerning the foundation of Japan. It describes how Ninigi-no-Mikoto, grandson of Amaterasu and great-grandfather of Emperor Jimmu, descended from heaven to Takachihonomine in Kyūshū and became the progenitor of the Japanese Imperial line.
- The Nakatsumaki begins with the conquests of Jimmu, which make him the first Emperor of Japan; and ends with the 15th Emperor, Ōjin. The second through ninth Emperors' reigns are recorded in a minimum of detail, with only their names, the names of their various descendants, and the locations of their palaces and tombs listed, with no mention of their achievements. Many of the stories in this volume are mythological; the allegedly historical information is highly suspect.
- The Shimotsumaki covers the 16th to 33rd Emperors and, unlike previous volumes, has very limited references to interactions with deities. (Such interactions are very prominent in the first and second volumes.) Information about the 24th to 33rd Emperors is scant.

== Synopsis ==
What follows is a condensed summary of the contents of the text, including many of the names of gods, emperors, and locations as well as events which took place in association with them. The original Japanese is included in parentheses where appropriate.

=== Preface (序) ===
Ō no Yasumaro's preface, in the form of a dedicatory address to Empress Genmei, begins with a poem summarizing the main contents of the work. He then relates how Emperor Tenmu commissioned Hieda no Are to memorize the genealogies and records of the imperial house years earlier, and how Genmei in turn ordered Yasumaro to compile a written record of what Are had learned. He finally concludes the preface with a brief explanation of the Chinese characters used to transcribe native Japanese words in the text and the division of the work into three volumes.

=== The Kamitsumaki (上巻), or first volume ===
The Beginning of Heaven and Earth
When heaven and earth came into existence, three gods collectively known as the Kotoamatsukami (別天津神, "Distinguished Heavenly Kami") appeared, who were then followed by seven generations of deities. The seventh and final generation of kami, a male-female pair known as Izanagi-no-Mikoto (伊邪那岐命) and Izanami-no-Mikoto (伊邪那美命), are ordered to solidify and shape the earth, which was then like floating oil on the primeval ocean. The couple, using a spear, churn the ocean, thus forming the island of Onogoro (淤能碁呂島).
The Birth of the Gods (神生み Kamiumi)
Making their home on the island, Izanagi and Izanami marry and beget the islands of Japan as well as numerous other kami. Izanami dies while giving birth to the fire god Kagutsuchi-no-Kami (火神迦具土神); in a fit of rage, Izanagi kills the newborn Kagutsuchi and searches for his wife in Yomi (黄泉国, Yomi no kuni), the land of the dead. Izanami reveals that she had already eaten the food of the underworld and thus cannot return to the land of the living; she will, however, try to ask for permission and bade Izanagi to wait. Izanagi loses his patience and lights his comb as a torch to gaze at his wife, only to find that Izanami is now a rotting corpse. Horrified at this sight, Izanagi runs away and seals the entrance to Yomi. Izanami pronounces a curse, vowing to kill a thousand people each day, to which Izanagi replies that he will then beget fifteen hundred people everyday to thwart her. Izanagi, feeling contaminated by his visit to Yomi, went to immerse himself in a river, bringing more gods into existence as he does so. The three most important kami, the "Three Precious Children" (三貴子, mihashira no uzu no miko, sankishi) – Amaterasu Ōmikami (天照大御神), Tsukuyomi-no-Mikoto (月読命), and Susanoo-no-Mikoto (須佐之男命) – came into existence when Izanagi washed his left eye, his right eye, and his nose, respectively.
Amaterasu and Susanoo

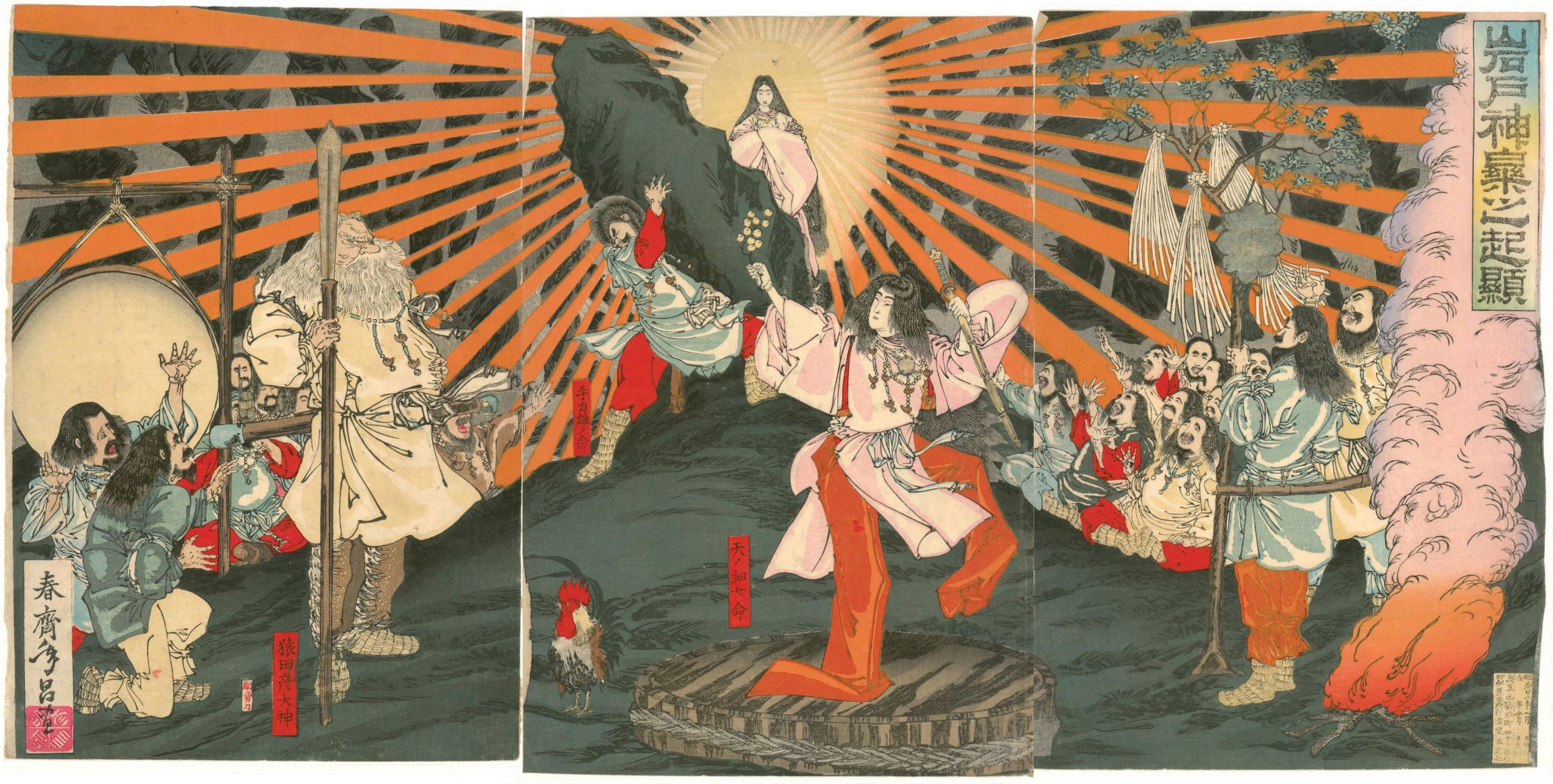
Amaterasu emerges out of the Heavenly Rock Cave (Shunsai Toshimasa, 1889)

Izanagi divides the world among his three children: Amaterasu was allotted Takamagahara (高天原, the "Plain of High Heaven"), Tsukuyomi the night, and Susanoo the seas. Susanoo, who missed his mother and kept weeping and howling incessantly, rejects his appointed task, leading Izanagi to expel him. Susanoo then goes up to Takamagahara, claiming to wish to see his sister. When a suspicious Amaterasu went out to meet him clad in armor, Susanoo protested his innocence and proposed that they exchange oaths. Five male kami (Amaterasu's sons) and three female kami (Susanoo's daughters) come into existence when the two gods each chewed and spat out an object carried by the other (Amaterasu Susanoo's sword, Susanoo Amaterasu's magatama beads) during the rite of oath-taking. Susanoo, declaring himself the winner of the contest, "raged with victory" and proceeds to wreak havoc upon Takamagahara, causing Amaterasu to hide in the Ama-no-Iwato (天岩戸, the "Heavenly Rock Cave"), plunging heaven and earth into total darkness. The gods, led by the wise Omoikane-no-Kami (思金神), eventually persuade her to come out of the cave, restoring light to the world. As punishment for his misdeeds, Susanoo is thrown out of Takamagahara.

Susanoo asks the kami of food, Ōgetsuhime-no-Kami (大気都比売神), to give him something to eat. When the goddess produced foodstuffs from her mouth, nose, and rectum, a disgusted Susanoo kills her, at which various crops, plants and seeds spring from her dead body. Susanoo then makes his way down to Ashihara-no-Nakatsukuni (葦原中国, the "Central Land of Reed Plains", i.e. the earthly land of Japan), to the land of Izumo, where he slays a monstrous eight-headed serpent called the Yamata-no-Orochi (八俣遠呂智) to rescue the earthly goddess Kushinadahime (櫛名田比売), whom he married. Out of the serpent's carcass, Susanoo finds the sword Ame-no-Murakumo-no-Tsurugi (天叢雲剣, "Heavenly Sword of Gathering Clouds"), which he presents to Amaterasu as a reconciliatory gift.
Ōkuninushi

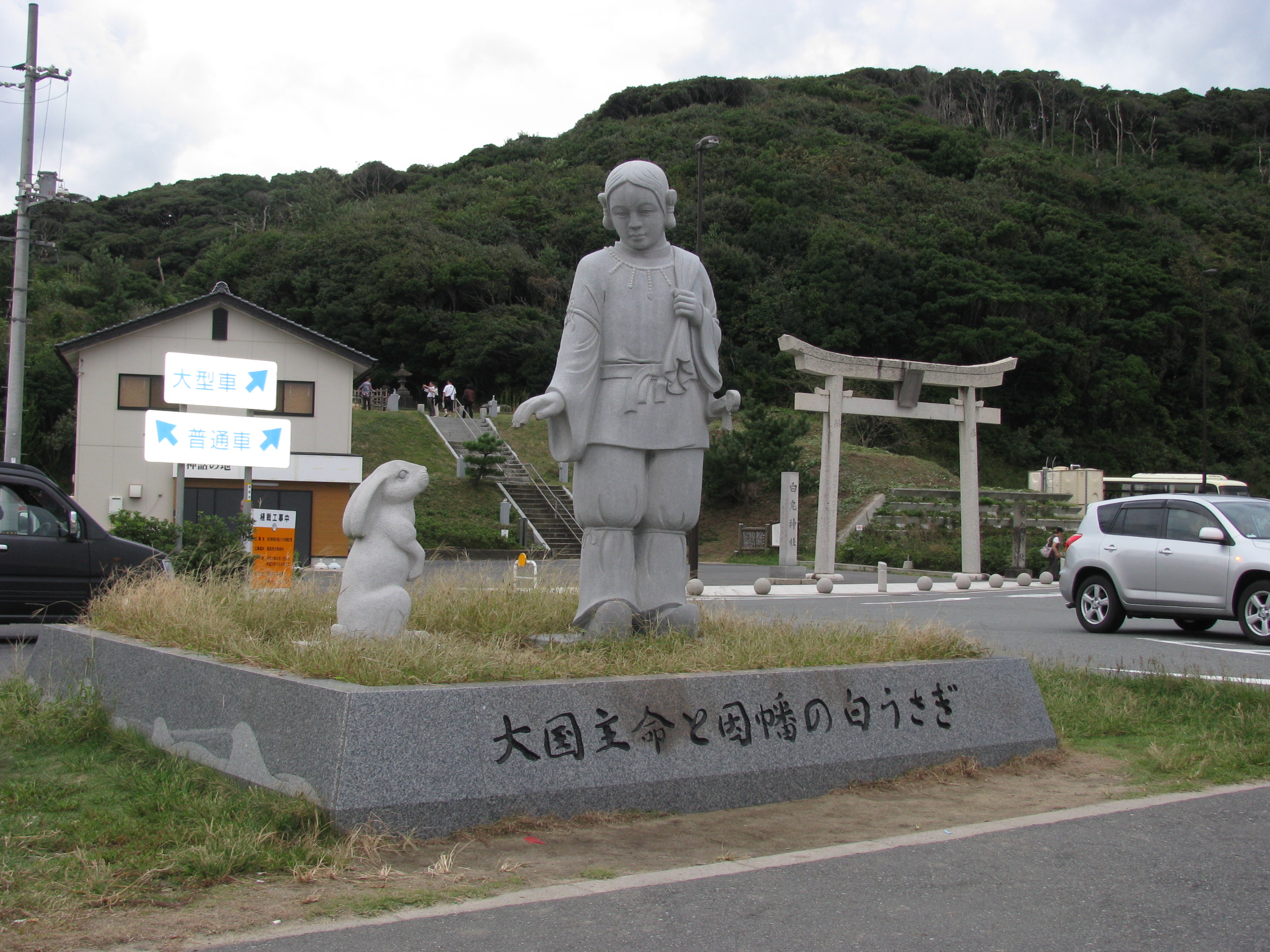
Ōnamuji (Ōkuninushi) meets the Hare of Inaba

A descendant of Susanoo, Ōnamuji-no-Kami (大穴牟遅神), helps a hapless hare that had been mistreated by his eighty brothers (八十神, yasogami); the hare, in turn, helps Ōnamuji win the hand of the goddess Yagamihime (八上比売) of Inaba. This earns Ōnamuji the jealousy of his brothers, who begin to make repeated attempts on his life. Seeking refuge in a subterranean realm ruled by Susanoo called Ne-no-Katasukuni (根之堅洲国), Ōnamuji meets and falls in love with Susanoo's daughter Suseribime-no-Mikoto (須勢理毘売). Upon learning of their affair, Susanoo imposes four trials on Ōnamuji, each of which he overcame with Suseribime's help. Ōnamuji manages to outwit Susanoo and leave the realm, taking his new wife Suseribime as well as Susanoo's sword, koto, and bow and arrows back with him, but not before being advised by Susanoo to change his name to Ōkuninushi-no-Kami (大国主神, "Master of the Great Land"). Ōkuninushi defeats his wicked brothers and becomes the lord of Ashihara-no-Nakatsukuni. Under the name Yachihoko-no-Kami (八千矛神, "Eight Thousand Spears"), he takes a third wife, Nunakawahime (沼河比売) of Koshi.

A tiny god riding on the waves of the sea in a bean-pod appears before Ōkuninushi. A god in the form of a scarecrow named Kuebiko (久延毘古) identifies the dwarf as Sukunabikona-no-Kami (少名毘古那神), a son of Kamimusubi-no-Kami (神産巣日神), one of the three primordial Kotoamatsukami. Sukunabikona assists Ōkuninushi in his task of creating and developing the land (kuni-zukuri), but eventually crosses over to the "eternal land" (常世国, tokoyo no kuni), leaving Ōkuninushi without a partner. Another deity, Ōmononushi-no-Kami (大物主神), then appears and promises to aid Ōkuninushi if he will worship him. Ōkuninushi then enshrines Ōmononushi in Mount Mimoro in Yamato Province.

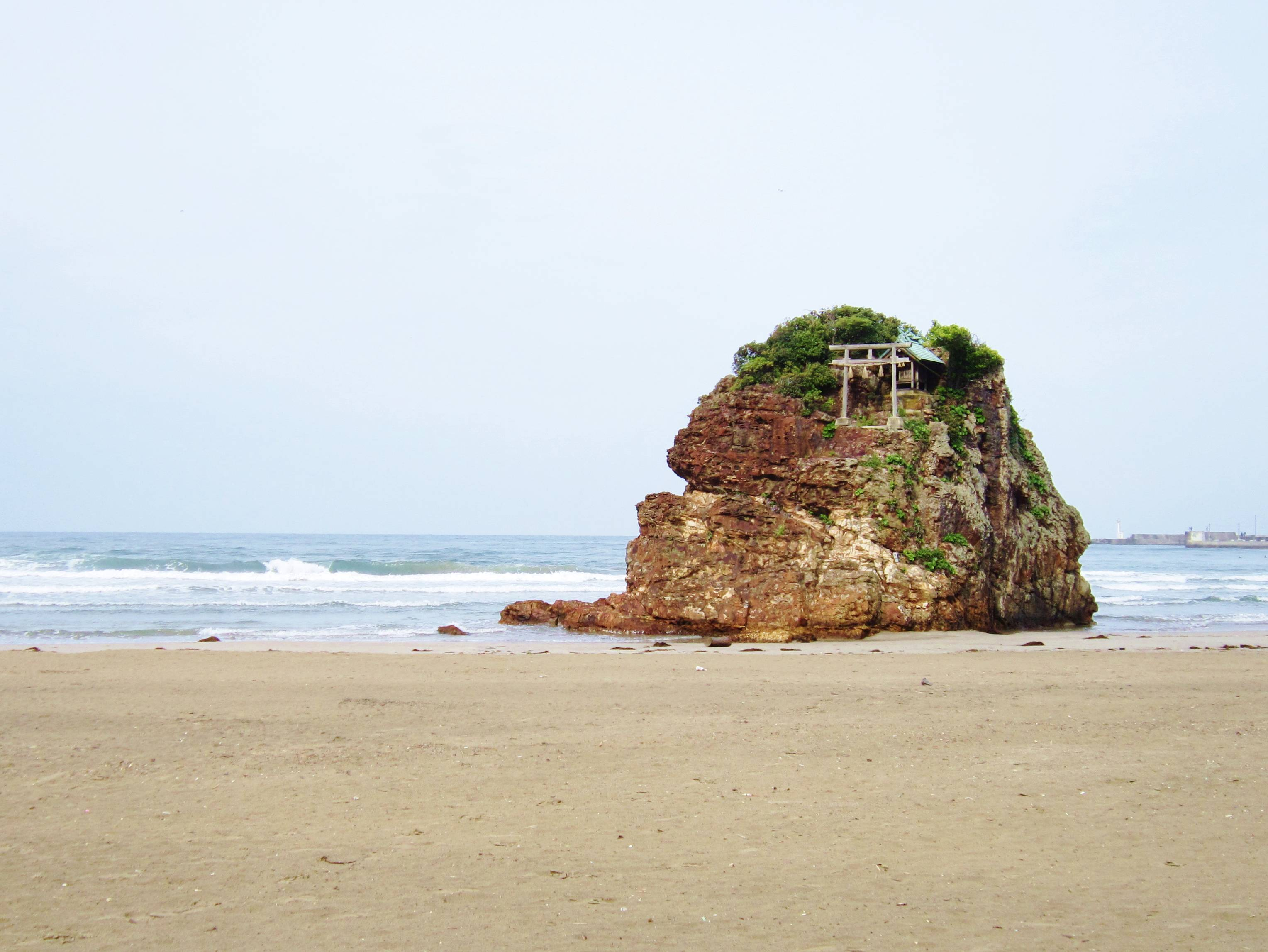
Inasa Beach, Shimane Prefecture

The Subjugation of Ashihara-no-Nakatsukuni
The gods dwelling in Takamagahara decide that Ashihara-no-Nakatsukuni, which they consider to be overpopulated by unruly and evil kami, must be pacified and turned over to their rule. Amaterasu decrees that Ame-no-Oshihomimi-no-Mikoto (天忍穂耳命), one of the five sons born to her when Susanoo chewed her magatama beads, shall be the one sent down to take possession of the land. Ame-no-Oshihomimi, after observing the earth below, deems it to be too tumultuous and refuses to go. Another son, Ame-no-Hohi-no-Mikoto (天菩比命) was sent, but ended up siding with Ōkuninushi and did not return for three years. A third messenger, Ame-no-Wakahiko (天若日子), was then dispatched, but ended up marrying Ōkuninushi's daughter Shitateruhime (下照比売) and did not report for eight years, plotting to gain the land for himself. He was eventually slain by the same arrow he used to shoot a pheasant sent by the heavenly deities to question him. During Ame-no-Wakahiko's funeral, Shitateruhime's brother Ajishikitakahikone-no-Kami (阿遅志貴高日子根神) is enraged at being mistaken for the dead god (whom he resembled in appearance) and destroys the mourning house (moya) where the funeral was held. The heavenly deities then dispatch the god of thunder, Takemikazuchi-no-Kami (建御雷神), who descends on the shores of Inasa (伊那佐之小浜, Inasa no ohama) in Izumo. Ōkuninushi tells Takemikazuchi to confer with his son Kotoshironushi-no-Kami (事代主神); after being questioned, Kotoshironushi accepts the demands of the heavenly kami and withdraws. When Takemikazuchi asks if Ōkuninushi has any other sons who ought to be consulted, Ōkuninushi's second son, Takeminakata-no-Kami (建御名方神), appears and brashly challenges Takemikazuchi to a test of strength but is defeated. Takeminakata flees to the sea of Suwa in Shinano, where he finally surrenders. After hearing that his two sons have submitted, Ōkuninushi relinquishes his control of the land, asking only that a magnificent palace be built in his honor. Ōkuninushi withdraws into the unseen world, while Takemikazuchi returns to Takamagahara, his mission completed.
The Descent of Ninigi, the Heavenly Grandson (天孫降臨 Tenson kōrin)
Ame-no-Oshihomimi is once again commanded to descend to Ashihara-no-Nakatsukuni in order to take possession of it, at which Ame-no-Oshihomimi recommends that his son, Hikoho-no-Ninigi-no-Mikoto (日子番能邇邇芸命), be sent instead. Amaterasu bequeaths to Ninigi three sacred treasures – the sword Kusanagi-no-Tsurugi (草薙剣, "Grass-cutter", another name for the Ame-no-Murakumo-no-Tsurugi) given to her by Susanoo, the mirror used by the other gods to lure her out of the Ama-no-Iwato, and magatama beads – and has a number of gods (which included the five divine ancestors of the priestly clans involved in the services of the imperial family) accompany him in his descent. As Ninigi was about to come down, an earthly deity named Sarutabiko-no-Kami (猿田毘古神) comes and offers to be his guide. Ninigi finally descends from heaven to the summit of Mount Takachiho in Himuka and sets up his dwelling there. He meets a goddess named Kohohana-no-Sakuyabime (木花之佐久夜毘売, "Princess of the Flowering Trees"), the daughter of Ōyamatsumi-no-Kami (大山津見神), the god of mountains, and seeks to marry her. Ōyamatsumi approves of the marriage and also offers his elder daughter Iwanagahime (石長比売 "Princess of the Eternal Rocks") to Ninigi, but Ninigi rejects her due to her ugliness. Ōyamatsumi declares that he had sent his two daughters to Ninigi to ensure that Ninigi would endure like the rocks and flourish like the trees and flowers; however, because Ninigi had rejected Iwanagahime in favor of Sakuyabime, he is doomed to live a life as fleeting as the blossoms of the trees. This, the story explains, is why the emperors – Ninigi's descendants – are mortal. Sakuyabime becomes pregnant after spending only one night with Ninigi, causing suspicion in Ninigi. To prove her fidelity, Sakuyabime confines herself inside a sealed birth hut and sets it ablaze as she was about to give birth. She delivered three children in the midst of the fire: Hoderi-no-Mikoto (火照命), Hosuseri-no-Mikoto (火須勢理命), and Hoori-no-Mikoto (火遠理命).
Hoori (Yamasachihiko)

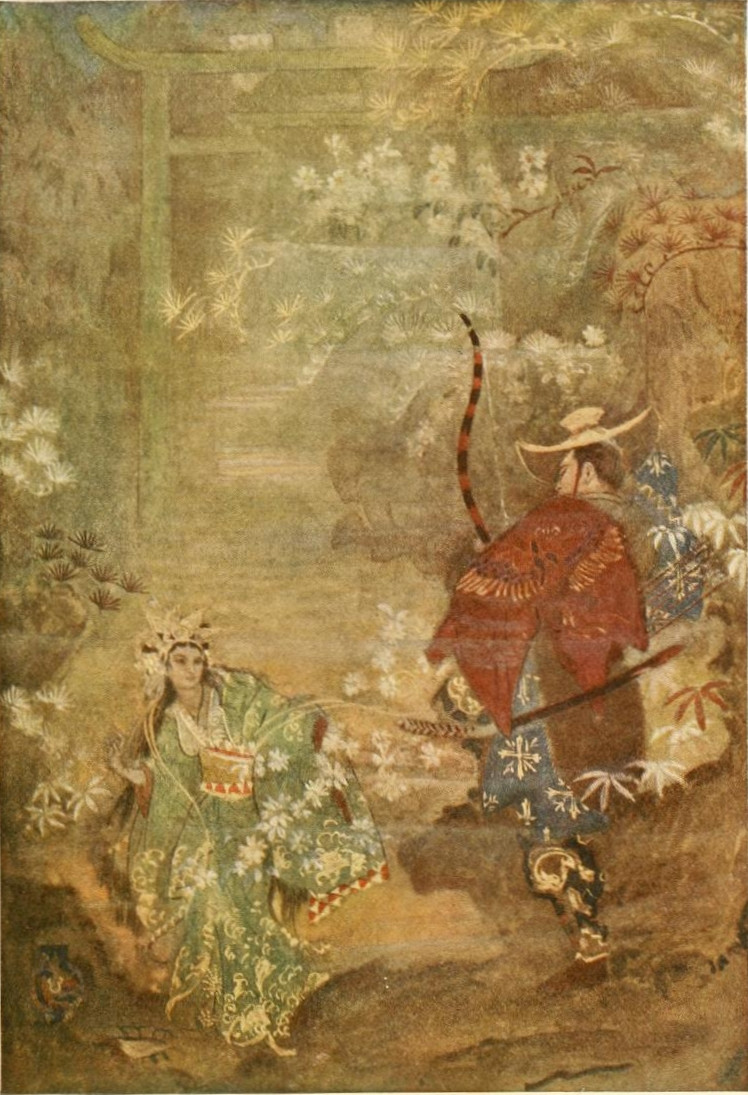
Hoori and Toyotamabime

Hoderi and Hoori, also known as Umisachihiko (海幸彦, "Luck of the Sea") and Yamasachihiko (山幸彦, "Luck of the Mountain"), grew up to be a fisherman and a hunter, respectively. One time, the brothers agree to exchange places and try using the other's tools. Hoori ended up losing his brother's fish hook in the sea; he tries to make compensation, but Hoderi, furious, insists on having the original hook. Hoori goes to the sea in search of the fish hook and ends up in the palace of the sea god, Watatsumi-no-Kami (綿津見神), where he is warmly welcomed, and marries Watatsumi's daughter, Toyotamabime (豊玉毘売). After staying in Watatsumi's realm for three years, Hoori expresses his wish to return to the surface. The lost fish hook is finally discovered lodged in a sea bream's throat. Watatsumi gives Hoori two magical jewels: the Shiomitsutama (塩盈珠, "Tide-raising Jewel") and the Shiofurutama (塩乾珠, "Tide-ebbing Jewel"), telling him to use both to subdue his brother. Hoori goes back to land on the back of a wani and returns the fish hook to Hoderi, now cursed to give bad luck to its user. Within three years, Hoderi became poverty-stricken and attempted to attack Hoori, who then used the two jewels to defeat him. Finally, Hoderi submitted and swore fealty to Hoori.
Ugayafukiaezu
Toyotamabime arrives on the surface pregnant with Hoori's child, wishing to give birth on land. A birth hut thatched with cormorant feathers was built for her. Toyotamahime tells Hoori not to look at her while she is giving birth; however, he breaks his promise and discovers her true form to be that of a wani. Angry and ashamed at having her true form discovered, she returned to the sea and never met him again. Hoori reigned in the palace at Takachiho for 580 years before his death. Toyotamahime entrusted her newborn son, whom she named Ugayafukiaezu-no-Mikoto (鵜葦草不合命, "Unfinished Cormorant-Feather Thatching"), to the care of her sister, Tamayoribime (玉依毘売命). Ugayafukiaezu eventually took his aunt Tamayoribime as his wife and had four children with her, one of whom was Kamu-Yamato-Iwarebiko-no-Mikoto (神倭伊波礼毘古命), also known as the Emperor Jimmu.

=== The Nakatsumaki (中巻), or second volume ===
- Kamu-Yamato-Iwarebiko-no-Mikoto (神倭伊波礼毘古命), or Emperor Jimmu (神武天皇)
  - Emperor Jimmu conquers Yamato
  - The sword from heaven, or Futsu no mitama (布都御魂), and the three-legged crow, or Yatagarasu (八咫烏)
  - The emperor's brother Hikoitsuse no Mikoto (彦五瀬命)
  - From Kumano (熊野) to Yamato (大和)
  - An ancient ballad, kumeuta (久米歌)
  - The Empress Isukeyorihime or Empress Hime Tatara Isuzu (伊須気余理比売)
  - The rebellion of Tagishimimi no Mikoto (当芸志美美命)
- Kamu-Nunakawamimi-no-Mikoto (神沼河耳命), or Emperor Suizei (綏靖天皇)
- Shikitsuhiko-Tamatemi-no-Mikoto (師木津日子玉手見命), or Emperor Annei (安寧天皇)
- Ōyamatohiko-Sukitomo-no-Mikoto (大倭日子鍬友命), or Emperor Itoku (懿徳天皇)
- Mimatsuhiko-Kaeshine-no-Mikoto (御真津日子可恵志泥命), or Emperor Kōshō (孝昭天皇)
- Ōyamato-Tarashihiko-Kuni-oshihito-no-Mikoto (大倭帯日子国押人命), or Emperor Kōan (孝安天皇)
- Ōyamato-Nekohiko-Futoni-no-Mikoto (大倭根子日子賦斗迩命), or Emperor Kōrei (孝霊天皇)
- Ōyamato-Nekohiko-Kunikuru-no-Mikoto (大倭根子日子国玖琉命), or Emperor Kōgen (孝元天皇)
- Wakayamato-Nekohiko-Ōbibi-no-Mikoto (若倭根子日子大毘毘命), or Emperor Kaika (開化天皇)
- Mimakiirihiko-Inie-no-Mikoto (御真木入日子印恵命), or Emperor Sujin (崇神天皇)
  - The emperor's son and queen
  - The god of Mount Miwa (三輪山) or Mimoro (三諸山), Ōmononushi (大物主神)
  - The rebellion of Takehaniyasu no Miko (建波邇安王)
  - Emperor Hatsukunishirashishi (初国知らしし天皇)
- Ikume-Iribiko-Isachi-no-Mikoto (伊久米伊理毘古伊佐知命), or Emperor Suinin (垂仁天皇)
  - The emperor's son and queen
  - The Sahobiko (沙本毘古) and Sahobime (沙本毘売)
  - Homuchiwakenomiko (本牟田智和気王) (円野比売)
  - The fruit of time
- Ōtarashihiko-Oshirowake-no-Sumeramikoto (大帯日子於斯呂和気天皇), or Emperor Keikō (景行天皇)
  - The emperor's son and queen
  - Yamato-Takeru-no-Mikoto's (倭建命) conquest of the Kumaso people (熊襲)
  - Izumo-Takeru's (出雲建) Subjugation
  - Yamato Takeru's conquest of the eastern regions
  - Miyazuhime (美夜受比売)
  - The Kunishinobiuta (思国歌), or country song
  - Yahiroshiro Chidori (八尋白智鳥)
  - Yamato-Takeru's Posterity
- Wakatarashihiko-no-Sumeramikoto (若帯日子天皇), or Emperor Seimu (成務天皇)
- Tarashi-Nakatsuhiko-no-Sumeramikoto (帯中日子天皇), or Emperor Chūai (仲哀天皇)
  - The emperor's son and queen
  - The divine possession of Empress Consort Jingū (神功皇后)
  - The empress consort's expedition to Silla (新羅)
  - Kagosaka no Miko (香坂王) and Oshikuma no Miko's (忍熊王) rebellion
  - The great god Kehi (気比大神)
  - The Sakekura song (酒楽)
- Homudawake-no-Mikoto (品陀和気命), or Emperor Ōjin (応神天皇)
  - The emperor's son and queen
  - Price Ōyamamori no Mikoto (大山守命) and Emperor Ōsazaki no Mikoto (大雀命)
  - Yakahaehime (矢河枝比売)
  - Kaminagahime (長髪比売)
  - The Kuzu song (国栖)
  - The tribute of Baekje (百済)
  - The rebellion of Price Ōyamamori no Mikoto (大山守命)
  - Visit of Amenohiboko (天之日矛)
  - Akiyama Shitahiotoko (秋山の下氷壮夫) and Haruyama Kasumiotoko (春山の霞壮夫)
  - The emperor's posterity

=== The Shimotsumaki (下巻), or final volume ===
- Ōsazaki no mikoto (大雀命), or Emperor Nintoku (仁徳天皇)
  - The emperor's son and queen
  - Kibi Kurohime (吉備の黒日売)
  - Yatanowakiiratsume (八田若郎女) and Iha no hime (石之日売)
  - Hayabusawake no kimi (速総別王) and Medori no kimi (女鳥王)
  - Wild goose eggs
  - A boat called Kareno (枯野), or desolate field
- Izahowake no miko (伊邪本若気王), or Emperor Richū (履中天皇)
  - The rebellion of Suminoenonakatsu no kimi (墨江中王)
  - Mizuhawake no kimi (水歯別王) and Sobakari (曾婆可理)
- Mizuhawake no mikoto (水歯別命), or Emperor Hanzei (反正天皇)
- Osatsumawakugonosukune no miko (男浅津間若子宿迩王), or Emperor Ingyō (允恭天皇)
  - The emperor's son and queen
  - Uji kabane system (氏姓制度)
  - Karunohitsugi no miko (軽太子) and Karunōhoiratsume (軽大郎女)
- Anaho no miko (穴穂御子), or Emperor Ankō (安康天皇)
  - Ōkusaka no kimi (大日下王) and Nenōmi (根臣)
  - The incident of Mayowa no kimi (目弱王) and Mayowa no ōkimi (眉輪王)
  - Ichinobenōshiwa no kimi (市辺之忍歯王)
- Ōhatsusewakatake no mikoto (大長谷若建命), or Emperor Yūryaku (雄略天皇)
  - The emperor's son and queen
  - Wakakusakabe no kimi (若日下部王)
  - Akaiko (赤猪子)
  - Yoshinomiya (吉野宮)
  - Kazuraki (葛城) Hitokotonushi no ōkami (一言主大神)
  - Odohime (袁努比売), Mie Uneme (三重の采女)
- Shiraka no ōyamato (白髪大倭根子命), or Emperor Seinei (清寧天皇)
  - Shijimu Nihimurōtage (志自牟の新室楽)
  - Utagaki (歌垣)
- Iwasuwake no mikoto (石巣別命), or Emperor Kenzō (顕宗天皇)
  - Okeme Roujo (置目老女)
  - Misasagi no Tsuchi (御陵の土)
- Ōke no miko (意富迩王), or Emperor Ninken (仁賢天皇)
- Ohatsuse no wakasazaki no mikoto (小長谷若雀命), or Emperor Buretsu (武烈天皇)
- Ohodo no mikoto (袁本矛命), or Emperor Keitai (継体天皇)
- Hirokunioshitakekanahi no miko (広国押建金日王), or Emperor Ankan (安閑天皇)
- Takeohirokunioshitate no mikoto (建小広国押楯命), or Emperor Senka (宣化天皇)
- Amekunioshiharukihironiwa no sumeramiko (天国押波琉岐広庭天皇), or Emperor Kinmei (欽明天皇)
- Nunakurafutotamashiki no mikoto (沼名倉太玉敷命), or Emperor Bidatsu (敏達天皇)
- Tachibananotoyohi no miko (橘豊日王), or Emperor Yōmei (用明天皇)
- Hatsusebenowakasazaki no sumeramikoto (長谷部若雀天皇), or Emperor Sushun (崇峻天皇)
- Toyomikekashikiyahime no mikoto (豊御食炊屋比売命), or Empress Suiko (推古天皇)

== English-language translations ==
- Chamberlain, Basil Hall. 1882. A translation of the "Ko-ji-ki" or Records of ancient matters. Yokohama, Japan: R. Meiklejohn and Co., Printers. (www.sacred-texts.com)
- Philippi, Donald L. 1968/1969. Kojiki. Princeton, New Jersey: Princeton University Press and Tokyo: University of Tokyo Press. (ISBN 978-0691061603)
- Heldt, Gustav. 2014. The Kojiki: An Account of Ancient Matters. New York: Columbia University Press. (ISBN 978-0-231-16389-7)

== See also ==
- Atsuta Shrine
- Historiography of Japan
- Japanese Historical Text Initiative
- Kokki
- Kujiki
- Kyūji
- Mahoroba
- Nihon Shoki
- Philosophy of history
- Teiki
- Tennōki
- The White Hare of Inaba
