= Jessica Michibata =

Japanese fashion model (born 1984)

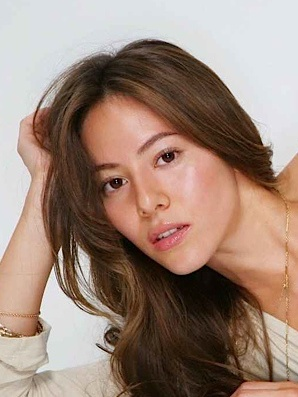
- Jessica Michibata (2012)
- Born: Jessica Celeste Michibata; October 21, 1984 (age 42); Fukui, Japan
- Spouses: Jenson Button (m. 2014; div. 2015); Ken Kao (m. 2016)
- Children: 1
- Modeling information
- Height: 1.73 m (5 ft 8 in)

Jessica Michibata (born Jessica Celeste Michibata; October 21, 1984) is a Japanese fashion model. She is the author of I Love Being Me, a book about self acceptance.

== Personal life ==
Michibata was born in Fukui Prefecture, Japan, to a Japanese mother and an Argentine father of Spanish and Italian descent.

Michibata was married to British Formula One driver Jenson Button. They married in Hawaii in December 2014. They divorced after one year of marriage.

Michibata is married to film producer Ken Kao. She gave birth to their child in 2017.

== Advertisements ==
- Michibata was a brand ambassador for TAG Heuer.
