= Teiki =

Historical Japanese text

The Teiki (帝紀) is a historical text purported to have been compiled in 681. The text is no longer extant.

== Background ==
According to the Nihon Shoki:

On the seventeenth day, the emperor, residing in his place in the Daigokuden, commanded Prince Kawashima, Prince Osakabe [etc...] to record a definitive edition of the Teiki and Jōko Shoji.

According to the Kojiki preface, Emperor Tenmu said:

What I hear is that the Teiki and Honji brought about by the many houses already differ from the truth and contain many inaccuracies. Should those mistakes not be corrected now, the original meaning will be lost within but a few years. They are the basis of the national system and are the foundation of the imperial government. Thus, I would like to carefully examine the Teiki and Kyūji, remove the errors, and establish the truth for future generations.

He then had Hieda no Are memorize the contents of the Teiki and Kyūji, both of which were later used as historical sources for composing the Kojiki.

== Title ==
The actual title of the text is unknown due to orthographic difficulties of old Japanese texts. The reading Teiki is taken from the on'yomi reading. In addition, traditional Japanese readings include Sumera Mikoto no Fumi and Sumerogi no Fumi. All literally mean "Imperial Chronicle".

The Kojiki preface makes reference to two other titles: Sumera Mikoto no Hitsugi (帝皇日嗣, "Genealogy of the Emperors") and Sakitsuyo no Furukoto (先代旧辞). Both are alternative names for the Teiki.

== Contents ==
As the text no longer exists, very little is actually known about it. The general view is that the Teiki described the imperial line. One theory claims that was a genealogy of the imperial line recording the reigns of each emperor. Another theory, based on the literal title, claims that it was a record of imperial accomplishments, but that it would not have been appropriate as a genealogy.

A competing theory identifies the second and third volume of the Kojiki as the actual contents of the Teiki. And yet another speculates that the Teiki and Kyūji were not two separate texts, but was rather a single unified text.

== See also ==
- Historiography of Japan
