= Ichikawa Shun'en II =

Japanese kabuki actor (born 1970)

Ichikawa Shun'en II 二代目市川春猿
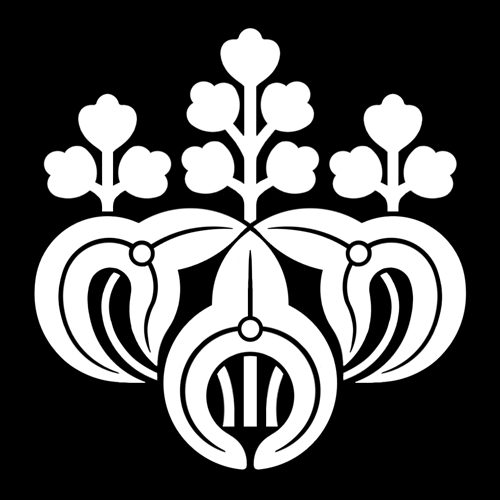
- The omodakagiri mon (water-plantain and paulownia crest) of Ichikawa Shun'en.
- Born: Gen Kondō; 29 November 1970; Tokyo, Japan
- Other name: Omodakaya

Ichikawa Shun'en II (二代目 市川 春猿, Nidaime Ichikawa Shun'en; b. 29 November 1970) is a Japanese kabuki actor. He is an onnagata actor, specializing in playing female roles. He has been described as a rapidly rising star, and is said to be particularly superb when portraying tragic figures.

Born Gen Kondō in 1970, in March 1988, at the age of 18, he completed the formal kabuki actor training course at the National Theatre of Japan. The following month he made his kabuki stage debut under his real name, performing a number of minor roles in a production of Chūshingura at the Kabuki-za. He became the apprentice or disciple of actor Ichikawa Ennosuke III in July the same year, and performed several minor roles in Yoshitsune Senbon Zakura under the name Ichikawa Shun'en II, officially becoming Ennosuke's heyago (a certain type of formal apprentice) in 1994.

Shun'en was promoted to nadaiyakusha (名題役者, an actor who plays major roles) in 2000. He is active in the entertainment world offstage, frequently appearing on television variety shows, and has appeared in television dramas and video games as well.
