= Musekinin Hero =

- Regular Edition Cover

Single by Kanjani8

from the album Puzzle
- Released: October 29, 2008
- Genre: Pop
- Length: 26:39 (Combined)
- Label: Imperial Records

Kanjani8 singles chronology
| "Wahaha" (2008) | "Musekinin Hero" (2008) | "Kyū Jō Show!!" (2009) |

Alternative covers
- Limited Edition A

Alternative cover
- Limited Edition B

"Musekinin Hero" (無責任ヒーロー, Musekinin Hīrō) (Eng: Irresponsible Hero) is the ninth single released by the Japanese boyband Kanjani8. The single was the first that featured three separate versions since the release of Kan Fu Fighting. The two limited edition singles featured different B-side tracks and DVDs of their unit and band performs from the 2009 Summer Concert tour. The regular edition featured one B side.

This single was released during the height of the 2008 American Presidential Election and the hidden gag for the single was biting off of the then Democrat Presidential Nominee Barack Obama craze that had hit Japan. Band member Ryuhei Maruyama played a campaigning politician in the promotional video and was featured inside the regular edition CD jacket.

"Musekinin Hero" is currently the group's most successful single, out performing the success of "Kan Fu Fighting" in just first week sales alone. The song managed to be the 11th top selling single in 2008 despite its late year release.

== Track listing ==
=== Regular Edition ===
1. " Musekinin Hero "
2. " Michishirube "
3. " Musekinin Hero <Original Karaoke> "

=== Limited Edition A ===
1. " Musekinin Hero "
2. " Kemuri "
3. " ∞o'clock 08 "

==== DVD ====
1. fuka fuka love the earth
2. BJ

=== Limited Edition B ===
1. " Musekinin Hero "
2. " fuka fuka love the earth "

==== DVD ====
1. Desire
  - Subaru Shibutani/Shota Yasuda Unit
2. Torn
  - Tadayoshi Okura/Ryo Nishikido Unit
3. Hoshi mono wa
  - You Yokoyama/Ryuhei Maruyama/Shingo Murakami Unit

== Charts ==
| Week | Oricon Weekly | Peak Position | Sales Total |
|---|---|---|---|
| November 10, 2008 | November Week 2 | 1 | 347,735 |
| November 17, 2008 | November Week 3 | 7 | 21,723 |
| November 24, 2008 | November Week 4 | 17 | 6,974 |
