= Kanpani =

Japanese TV game show

- Genre: Variety show
- Starring: Kanjani8 (You Yokoyama · Subaru Shibutani · Shingo Murakami · Ryuhei Maruyama · Shota Yasuda · Ryo Nishikido · Tadayoshi Okura)
- Narrated by: Nakamiti Mihoko
- Country of origin: Japan
- Original language: Japanese
- No. of episodes: 25

Production
- Camera setup: Multi-camera
- Running time: 15 Minutes

Original release
- Network: TV Asahi
- Release: 7 October 2009 – 31 March 2010

Kanpani (関パニ) is a Japanese TV game show where members of the group Kanjani8 tackled different tasks assigned by the unseen president of the company. The show aired every Wednesday on TV Asahi from 01:36 AM to 01:51 AM from 7 October 2009 to 31 March 2010.

== The show ==
To open each episode, the narrator states that due to the horrible economic situation, a show production team with very low budget seeks help from seven of their ADs, a.k.a. the members of Kanjani8. The ADs are to complete the tasks passed down from their president, of the company named KANPANI. On the official website for the show as well as at the beginning of every episode, the message below is also shown:

KANPANI is the abbreviation of the KANJANI COMPANY, a television production office that specializes in image and music. Everyone of us makes good use of their physical strength, intellect and acting talents to conduct independent inquiry and data gathering. We promptly transmit helpful information and survey results to the society, which you can use even from tomorrow. Moreover, we produce musical program ID, which will meet viewers' needs widely without being caught in a mere entertainment program production. Hereafter, we "KANPANI" will produce the new sensed entertainment program that everybody from kids to adults can enjoy, to make you audience happier.

The truthfulness behind these words remain unknown, but the lack of a background on the set of the show seems to verify the statement claiming a slow budget. The show then begins by stating the task or challenge of the day, which is said to be given by the unseen president. All members must then participate in achieving the goal. So far, none of the tasks had been completed. After the game, a fax is received on the set, with a verdict from the president stating the name and possibly reasons of the member(s) receiving the punishment for the team failure.

== Cast ==
- Kanjani8 (hosts)

(You Yokoyama | Subaru Shibutani | Shingo Murakami | Ryuhei Maruyama | Shota Yasuda | Ryo Nishikido | Tadayoshi Okura)

- Nakamiti Mihoko (Narrator)

== Broadcasting details ==
Episode	Air Date	Theme	Jersey Color	Single Word Message From	Punishment	Notes
01	7 October 2009	知ってどうなる?! 街録クイズSHOW / Man-on-the-street Interview Quiz SHOW	Red	Nishikido; Yokoyama	Poured Flour On	First appearance of Saijou-san.
02	14 October 2009	未確認商品解明しまSHOW / Let's Investigate This Unidentified Product SHOW	Green	Murakami; Maruyama	Slapped with a Harisen (Paper Fan)	
03	21 October 2009	10分頑張りまSHOW / Let's Do Our Best in 10 Minutes SHOW	Blue	Okura; Yasuda	Poured Flour On	It appears Okura was absent due to influenza.
04	28 October 2009	知ってどうなる?! 街録クイズSHOW / Man-on-the-street Interview Quiz SHOW	Red	All	Poured Flour On	It appears Okura was absent due to influenza.
05	4 November 2009	鏡文字で答えまSHOW / Let's Answer in Mirror Letters SHOW	Blue	All	Poured Flour On	
06	11 November 2009	10分頑張りまSHOW / Let's Do Our Best in 10 Minutes SHOW	Blue	Maruyama; Shibutani		
07	18 November 2009	顔面ディナーSHOW / Face Dinner SHOW	Red	All	Slapped with a Harisen (Paper Fan)	
08	25 November 2009	身の程を知りまSHOW / Let's Get to Know One's Own Place SHOW	Green	Maruyama	Slapped with a Harisen (Paper Fan)	
09	2 December 2009	噛まずに言い切りまSHOW / Let's Say It Without Stumbling SHOW	Blue	Maruyama	Slapped with a Harisen (Paper Fan)	The members discuss that there is a new person carrying out the Harisen punishment. More than one hour of material was recorded.
10	9 December 2009	知ってどうなる?! 街録クイズSHOW / Man-on-the-street Interview Quiz SHOW	Green	Nishikido	Poured Flour On	Second appearance of Saijou-san.
11	16 December 2009	世界の激辛料理食べつくしまSHOW / Let's Eat the World's Spiciest Food SHOW	Blue	Okura	N/A	Among Kanjani∞ members the strongest with hot food is Yasuda and the weakest – Shibutani.
12	23 December 2009	今夜はクリスマススペシャル! はずれくじ避けまSHOW / Tonight is Christmas Special! Let's Avoid Failure Lottery SHOW	White Outfits from "Gift"	All		Performance of "Fuyu Koi"、"Yuki wo kudasai" and "Minus 100 do no Koi".
13	6 January 2010	ランキング避けまSHOW / Let's Avoid Ranking SHOW	Green	All; Maruyama	Poured Water On	
14	13 January 2010	かぶったら負けでSHOW / Repeating Is Losing SHOW	Red	All	Poured Flour On	
15	20 January 2010	噛まずに言い切りまSHOW / Let's Say It Without Stumbling SHOW	Blue	All; Okura	Slapped with a Harisen (Paper Fan)	
16	27 January 2010	プレッシャーに打ち勝ちまSHOW / Let's Overcome Pressure SHOW	Blue	All	Slapped with a Harisen (Paper Fan); Poured Water On	
17	3 February 2010	腹八分目食べまSHOW / Let's Be Moderate in Eating SHOW	Red	Nishikido	Poured Water On	
18	10 February 2010	一筆で伝えまSHOW / Let's Convey It with a Stroke of a Pen SHOW	Blue	All	Poured Flour On	
19	17 February 2010	3対3狙いまSHOW / Let's Aim at 3:3 SHOW	Green	All	Slapped with a Harisen (Paper Fan)	More than 2 hours were recorded.
20	24 February 2010	身の程を知りまSHOW / Let's Get to Know One's Own Place SHOW	Red			
21	3 March 2010	意外な物を値段当てまSHOW / Let's Guess the Price of Unexpected Products SHOW	Green		Slapped with Double Harisen (Paper Fan)	
22	10 March 2010	ありそうな言葉検索しまSHOW	Blue		Slapped with a Harisen/Double Harisen (Paper Fan)	
23	17 March 2010	影絵で表現しまSHOW	Green		Poured Water On	
24	24 March 2010	センスくらべまSHOW	Blue		Slapped with a Harisen (Paper Fan)	
25 (Final Episode)	31 March 2010	絵描き歌伝えまSHOW				

== Tasks/challenges ==
Episode	Air Date	Tasks and Challenges	Results	Punishment Received By	Ratings
01	7 October 2009	To guess correctly a specific old man's idea of a "good eat".	Failure	Yokoyama You	2.5%
02	14 October 2009	Figure out the functions of two unknown commercial products.	Failure	Nishikido Ryo	3.5%
03	21 October 2009	Finish eating the top 30 favorite items in oden within 10 minutes.	Failure	Nishikido Ryo	2.2%
04	28 October 2009	Correctly guess a drag-queen's childhood dream.; Find the member most popular among the selected drag-queens.	Failure	Yokoyama You	3.5%
05	4 November 2009		Success	Yokoyama You (once); Shibutani Subaru (three times); Nishikido Ryo (once); Murakami Shingo (once)	2.9%
06	11 November 2009	To finish the thirty-one scoops of the top thirty-one most popular ice-cream flavors from Baskin Robbins in ten minutes.	Success	None	5.3%
07	18 November 2009	Two teams compete to guess correctly the gourmet dishes being presented based solely on the presenter's facial expression.	N/A	Maruyama Ryuhei	2.7%
08	25 November 2009	To complete a race based on each member's individual ranks drawn from a raffle.	Failure	Shibutani Subaru	3.8%
09	2 December 2009	As cast members, Kanjani8 must finish a script made of tongue-twisters with no mistake.	Success	Okura Tadayoshi (once); Yasuda Shota (once); Yokoyama You (twice); Maruyama Ryuhei (four times); Murakami Shingo (twice); Nishikido Ryo (once)	2.8%
10	9 December 2009		Failure	Maruyama Ryuhei	3.5%
11	16 December 2009		Success	None	4.2%
12	23 December 2009				1.8%
13	6 January 2010		N/A	Yokoyama You	3.2%
14	13 January 2010		Success	All	
15	20 January 2010		Success	Okura Tadayoshi (once); Nishikido Ryo (four times); Shibutani Subaru (twice); Yasuda Shota (once); Murakami Shingo (once); Maruyama Ryuhei (once)	
16	27 January 2010		N/A	Maruyama Ryuhei (twice); Shibutani Subaru (twice); Yokoyama You (three times); Nishikido Ryo (twice)	
17	3 February 2010		N/A	Okura Tadayoshi	
18	10 February 2010		Failure	All	
19	17 February 2010		Failure	Yokoyama You (twice); Yasuda Shota (three times); Nishikido Ryo (twice); Maruyama Ryuhei (once); Okura Tadayoshi (twice); Shibutani Subaru (twice); Murakami Shingo (twice)	
20	24 February 2010	To keep one's face underwater for more than 30 seconds.	Failure		
21	3 March 2010	To guess whether the suggested price of a product is higher or lower than the real price.	N/A	Yasuda Shota	
22	10 March 2010		N/A	Yasuda Shota; Maruyama Ryuhei; Yokoyama You; Tadayoshi Okura	
23	17 March 2010		N/A	Yokoyama You	
24	24 March 2010		N/A	Shibutani Subaru; Murakami Shingo; Okura Tadayoshi	
25 (Final Episode)	31 March 2010				

== Music ==
The opening, ending, and in-between music segments are created and performed live by Kanjani8.
Background music for the show comes from Kanjani8's previously released music numbers.
