= Bōken Japan! Kanjani8 Map =

- Genre: Variety show
- Starring: Kanjani8 (You Yokoyama; Subaru Shibutani; Shingo Murakami; Ryuhei Maruyama; Shota Yasuda; Ryo Nishikido; Tadayoshi Okura)
- Country of origin: Japan
- Original language: Japanese

Production
- Running time: 30 minutes

Original release
- Network: TV Asahi

Bōken JAPAN! Kanjani8 MAP (冒険JAPAN! 関ジャニ∞MAP) was a Japanese TV show hosted by the members of the group Kanjani8 that aired every Sunday on TV Asahi from 09:30 AM to 10:00 AM. The show ran from April 4, 2010 to March 25, 2012 for a total of 96 episodes.

== Cast ==
- Kanjani8 (Hosts)

(You Yokoyama | Subaru Shibutani | Shingo Murakami | Ryuhei Maruyama | Shota Yasuda | Ryo Nishikido | Tadayoshi Okura)

- Tamiyoshi Okuda (Narrator)

== Broadcasting Details ==
=== 2010 ===
Episode	Air Date	Members	Location	Guest Appearance
01	April 4, 2010	Subaru Shibutani, Shingo Murakami, Shota Yasuda	Wakasa, Fukui Prefecture	
02	April 11, 2010	You Yokoyama, Ryuhei Maruyama, Tadayoshi Okura	Susami, Wakayama Prefecture	
03	April 18, 2010	Shota Yasuda, Tadayoshi Okura	Ogano, Chichibu District, Saitama Prefecture	
04	April 25, 2010	Shingo Murakami, Ryo Nishikido	Hazu, Aichi Prefecture	
05	May 2, 2010	Shingo Murakami, Ryuhei Maruyama	Futtsu, Chiba Prefecture	
06	May 9, 2010	Subaru Shibutani, Tadayoshi Okura	Shiokawa, Kitakata, Fukushima Prefecture	
07	May 16, 2010	Subaru Shibutani, Shota Yasuda, Ryo Nishikido	Akinada Tobishima Kaido, Kure, Hiroshima Prefecture (Part 1)	
08	May 23, 2010	Subaru Shibutani, Shota Yasuda, Ryo Nishikido	Akinada Tobishima Kaido, Kure, Hiroshima Prefecture (Part 2)	
09	May 30, 2010	Shingo Murakami, Tadayoshi Okura	Shimizu Ward, Shizuoka Prefecture	
10	June 6, 2010	Ryuhei Maruyama, Shota Yasuda	Toba, Mie Prefecture	
11	June 27, 2010	You Yokoyama, Subaru Shibutani, Shota Yasuda	Kushiro, Hokkaido Prefecture (Part 1)	
12	July 4, 2010	You Yokoyama, Subaru Shibutani, Shota Yasuda	Kushiro, Hokkaido Prefecture (Part 2)	
13	July 11, 2010	Subaru Shibutani, Shingo Murakami	Yanaka, Nezu and Sendagi, Tokyo Metropolis	
14	July 18, 2010	Shingo Murakami, Ryuhei Maruyama, Shota Yasuda	Izena Island and Ishigaki Island, Okinawa Prefecture	
15	July 25, 2010	Shingo Murakami, Ryuhei Maruyama, Shota Yasuda	Ishigaki Island and Taketomi Island, Okinawa Prefecture	
16	August 1, 2010	Subaru Shibutani, Ryuhei Maruyama	Aomori, Aomori Prefecture	
17	August 8, 2010	You Yokoyama, Ryuhei Maruyama, Shota Yasuda	Sasebo, Nagasaki Prefecture	
18	August 15, 2010	You Yokoyama, Ryuhei Maruyama, Shota Yasuda	Saga Prefecture	
19	August 22, 2010	Subaru Shibutani, Shingo Murakami	Noto, Ishikawa Prefecture	
20	August 29, 2010	Shingo Murakami, Ryuhei Maruyama, Shota Yasuda	Kochi Prefecture (Part 1)	
21	September 5, 2010	Shingo Murakami, Ryuhei Maruyama, Shota Yasuda	Kochi Prefecture (Part 2)	
22	September 12, 2010	You Yokoyama, Shota Yasuda	Tochigi Prefecture	
23	September 19, 2010	Shingo Murakami, Tadayoshi Okura	Shimane Prefecture	
24	September 26, 2010	You Yokoyama, Subaru Shibutani, Shota Yasuda	Miyagi Prefecture (Part 1)	
25	October 3, 2010	You Yokoyama, Subaru Shibutani, Shota Yasuda	Miyagi Prefecture (Part 2)	
26	October 10, 2010	Shingo Murakami, Shota Yasuda	Toyama Prefecture	
27	October 17, 2010	Subaru Shibutani, Shingo Murakami	Kagoshima Prefecture (Part 1)	
28	October 24, 2010	Subaru Shibutani, Shingo Murakami, Tadayoshi Okura	Kagoshima Prefecture (Part 2)	
29	October 31, 2010	Shota Yasuda, Ryo Nishikido	Tokushima Prefecture	
30	November 14, 2010	Subaru Shibutani, Ryo Nishikido	Sapporo, Hokkaido Prefecture	Taka and Toshi
31	November 21, 2010	Shingo Murakami, Ryuhei Maruyama	Fukuoka Prefecture	Hanamaru-Daikichi Hakata
32	November 28, 2010	You Yokoyama, Ryuhei Maruyama	Tango Peninsula, Kyoto Prefecture	Katsuya Nomura
33	December 5, 2010	You Yokoyama, Subaru Shibutani	Tottori Prefecture	Hanako & Daisuke Miyagawa
34	December 12, 2010	Shota Yasuda, Tadayoshi Okura	Hyogo Prefecture	Takuhiro Kimura
35	December 19, 2010	Shingo Murakami, Tadayoshi Okura	Gifu Prefecture	Naoko Takahashi
36	December 26, 2010	You Yokoyama, Subaru Shibutani, Shota Yasuda	Okayama Prefecture	Junichi Komoto

=== 2011 ===
Episode	Air Date	Members	Location	Guest Appearance
37	January 9, 2011	You Yokoyama, Subaru Shibutani, Shota Yasuda	Hiroshima Prefecture	Ungirls
38	January 16, 2011	Shingo Murakami, Ryo Nishikido	Oita Prefecture	Akira Nishikino
39	January 23, 2011	Shota Yasuda, Tadayoshi Okura	Iwate Prefecture	Great Sasuke
40	January 30, 2011	Shota Yasuda, Ryo Nishikido, Tadayoshi Okura	Kumamoto Prefecture (Part 1)	Suzanne (Sae Yamamoto)
41	February 6, 2011	Shota Yasuda, Ryo Nishikido, Tadayoshi Okura	Kumamoto Prefecture (Part 2)	
42	February 13, 2011	Subaru Shibutani, Ryo Nishikido	Shimokita Peninsula, Aomori Prefecture	Shuhei Mainoumi
43	February 20, 2011	Shota Yasuda, Tadayoshi Okura	Miura Peninsula, Kanagawa Prefecture (Part 1)	Shingo Tsurumi
44	February 27, 2011	Shota Yasuda, Tadayoshi Okura	Miura Peninsula, Kanagawa Prefecture (Part 2)	
45	March 6, 2011	Ryuhei Maruyama, Tadayoshi Okura	Kitakyushu, Fukuoka Prefecture	Akimasa Haraguchi
46	March 20, 2011	Shota Yasuda, Ryo Nishikido	Yamaguchi Prefecture	Tomomi Nishimura
47	March 27, 2011	Subaru Shibutani, Tadayoshi Okura	Mikawa, Aichi Prefecture	Yasuko Mitsuura
48	April 3, 2011	Shingo Murakami, Shota Yasuda	Tsukiji and Tsukishima, Chuo Ward, Tokyo Metropolis	Terry Ito
49	April 10, 2011	Subaru Shibutani, Tadayoshi Okura	Izu Peninsula, Shizuoka Prefecture	Taka Guadalcanal
50	April 17, 2011	You Yokoyama, Shota Yasuda	The eastern part of Saitama Prefecture	Hokuyō
51	April 24, 2011	Subaru Shibutani, Shota Yasuda	Osaka (Part 1)	Hidekazu Akai
52	May 1, 2011	Subaru Shibutani, Shota Yasuda	Osaka (Part 2)	
53	May 8, 2011	Subaru Shibutani, Shingo Murakami	Yokohama, Kanagawa Prefecture (Part 1)	Mitz Mangrove
54	May 15, 2011	Subaru Shibutani, Shingo Murakami	Yokohama, Kanagawa Prefecture (Part 2)	
55	May 22, 2011	Shingo Murakami, Ryuhei Maruyama	Ehime Prefecture	Tomochika
56	May 29, 2011	You Yokoyama, Ryuhei Maruyama, Subaru Shibutani	Hiroshima Prefecture	Chizuru Azuma
57	June 5, 2011	You Yokoyama, Ryuhei Maruyama	Kyoto Prefecture	Seiji Chihara
58	June 12, 2011	You Yokoyama, Ryuhei Maruyama	Kyoto Prefecture	
59	June 19, 2011	Subaru Shibutani, Ryuhei Maruyama	Nagoya, Aichi Prefecture	Eiji Bando
60	June 26, 2011	Subaru Shibutani, Shota Yasuda	Kochi, Kochi Prefecture	Wakako Shimazaki
61	July 3, 2011	Subaru Shibutani, Shingo Murakami	Shinjuku Ward, Tokyo Metropolis	Sujitaro Tamabukuro
62	July 10, 2011	Subaru Shibutani, Shingo Murakami	Nakano City and Koenji, Tokyo Metropolis	Takanori Takeyama
63	July 17, 2011	You Yokoyama, Tadayoshi Okura	Namba, Osaka	Tomonori Jinnai
64	July 24, 2011	Subaru Shibutani, Shingo Murakami	Furano, Hokkaido Prefecture (Part 1)	Mai Satoda, Hidehiko Masuda
65	July 31, 2011	Subaru Shibutani, Shingo Murakami	Furano, Hokkaido Prefecture (Part 2)	
66	August 7, 2011	Subaru Shibutani, Tadayoshi Okura	Naha, Okinawa Prefecture (Part 1)	Yoko Gushiken
67	August 14, 2011	Subaru Shibutani, Tadayoshi Okura	Naha and Ishigaki Island, Okinawa Prefecture (Part 2)	
68	August 21, 2011	Subaru Shibutani, Tadayoshi Okura	Ishigaki Island, Okinawa Prefecture (Part 3)	
69	August 28, 2011	Shingo Murakami, Tadayoshi Okura	Ginza, Tokyo Metropolis	Terry Ito
70	September 4, 2011	You Yokoyama, Subaru Shibutani	Ishikawa Prefecture	Eisuke Sasai
71	September 11, 2011	Shingo Murakami, Tadayoshi Okura	Omotesando, Tokyo Metropolis	Izumi Mori
72	September 18, 2011	You Yokoyama, Subaru Shibutani	Toyama Prefecture	Shigeru Muroi
73	September 25, 2011	Subaru Shibutani, Shingo Murakami	Miyazaki Prefecture	Hideo Higashikokubaru
74	October 2, 2011	Shota Yasuda, Tadayoshi Okura	Hakodate, Hokkaido Prefecture	Gorō Ibuki
75	October 9, 2011	Subaru Shibutani, Ryuhei Maruyama	Daikanyama, Tokyo Metropolis (Part 1)	Masami Hisamoto
76	October 16, 2011	Subaru Shibutani, Ryuhei Maruyama; Shota Yasuda, Ryo Nishikido	Daikanyama, Tokyo Metropolis (Part 2); Setagaya Ward, Tokyo Metropolis (Part 1)	Masami Hisamoto; Kazuki Enari
77	October 23, 2011	Shota Yasuda, Ryo Nishikido	Setagaya Ward, Tokyo Metropolis (Part 2)	
78	October 30, 2011	Shota Yasuda, Ryo Nishikido	Toshima Ward, Tokyo Metropolis	Megumi Yokoyama
79	November 13, 2011	Ryuhei Maruyama, Shota Yasuda	Kyoto, Kyoto Prefecture (Part 1)	Momiji Yamamura
80	November 20, 2011	Ryuhei Maruyama, Shota Yasuda	Kyoto, Kyoto Prefecture (Part 2)	
81	November 27, 2011	Ryuhei Maruyama, Tadayoshi Okura	Shizuoka Prefecture	Nobuhiro Takeda
82	December 4, 2011	Shota Yasuda, Ryo Nishikido	Universal Studios Japan, Osaka	Asian
83	December 11, 2011	Shingo Murakami, Ryo Nishikido	Hyogo Prefecture	Shōko Haida
84	December 18, 2011	You Yokoyama, Shota Yasuda	Nagano Prefecture	
85	December 25, 2011	Shingo Murakami, Tadayoshi Okura	Fukuoka Prefecture	Hiroko Moriguchi

=== 2012 ===
Episode	Air Date	Members	Location	Guest Appearance
86	January 8, 2012	Subaru Shibutani, Ryuhei Maruyama	Akita Prefecture	Natsuki Kato
87	January 15, 2012	Ryo Nishikido, Tadayoshi Okura	Ishikawa Prefecture	Eisuke Sasai
88	January 22, 2012	Ryuhei Maruyama, Ryo Nishikido	Kamakura, Kanagawa Prefecture	Machiko Washio
89	January 29, 2012	Shingo Murakami, Shota Yasuda	Nihonbashi, Tokyo Metropolis	Yasutaro Matsuki
90	February 5, 2012	Subaru Shibutani, Ryuhei Maruyama	Shimabara, Nagasaki Prefecture	Hitoshi Kusano
91	February 12, 2012	Shingo Murakami, Shota Yasuda	Koenji and Asagaya, Tokyo Metropolis	Rie Shibata
92	February 19, 2012	Shota Yasuda, Tadayoshi Okura	Gifu Prefecture	Mr.Maric
93	February 26, 2012	You Yokoyama, Ryo Nishikido	Gunma Prefecture	Miyuki Imori
94	March 4, 2012	Shota Yasuda, Tadayoshi Okura	Kagoshima Prefecture	Sayuri Kokusho
95	March 18, 2012	All members		
96	March 25, 2012	All members		

== Music ==
The ending theme was Kanjani8's song "Wonderful World!!".
