= Can!Jani =

- Genre: Variety show
- Starring: Kanjani8 (You Yokoyama · Subaru Shibutani · Shingo Murakami · Ryuhei Maruyama · Shota Yasuda · Ryo Nishikido · Tadayoshi Okura)
- Country of origin: Japan
- Original language: Japanese
- No. of episodes: 49

Production
- Camera setup: Multi-camera
- Running time: 30 Minutes

Original release
- Network: TV Asahi
- Release: October 4, 2008 – September 26, 2009

Can! Jani: Kanjani Eight's Great Plan to Save the Planet Earth (Can!ジャニ：関ジャニ∞の地球救出大作戦, Kan! Jani: Kanjani Eito no Chikyū Kyūshutsu Dai sakusen) was a Japanese TV variety that aired every Saturday on TV Asahi. The show ran from October 4, 2008 to September 26, 2009 for a total of 49 episodes. It had suffered from frequent time changes before settling for the 3:00 pm time slot. The show was created after the high success of their two previous television specials that aired on TV Asahi, Dadaiyaman and Dadaiyaman Z. Its slogan first was, " For the world's sake, for the people's sake! " but it changed to " Can We Do It? Yes We Can! ", a play on the show's title as well as on Barack Obama's campaign slogan after he had won the U.S. presidential election (Episode 10).

Can! Jani, as it is commonly referred to, is a show in which Kanjani Eight were given assignments from Command Can to help better assist and save the planet earth. Each assignment, given to the show by its viewers, ranged from hiking in the woods to downtown Tokyo apartment guides. At the end of each episode Command Can would then give his score to the unit he sent out to complete the task, which, usually depending on the circumstances, always was a decent score.

The majority of the episodes opened up with a conversation between Command Can and Kanjani8. Command Can was an animated puppet on the show designed to look like a yellow can wearing a blue hat. He was extremely sarcastic, always taking the opportunity to berate the members of Kanjani8 and thoroughly embarrass them on TV. During the first half of the show, You Yokoyama would bicker with the character almost every week—usually trying to one up the can which would always then backfire on him.

== Cast ==
- Kanjani8 as themselves
- Keiji Hirai as Narrator
- Hagino Shihoko as Narrator

== Syndicated stations ==
- EX TV Asahi
- HTB - Hokkaido TV : On November 8, 2008, a Hokkaido TV Television Special caused it to air at 4:55 ~ 5:25 pm. This also happened again on December 25, 26, the 28th and then on January 4 that following year. These television specials caused Can! Jani to have an irregular broadcasting schedule in this region.
- ABA - Aoimori Asahi TV - Started on December 15 @ 4:30 pm
- AAB - Akita Asahi TV - Started on April 10, 2009 @ 12:45 am
- YTS - Yamagata TV - Started on April 4, 2009 at 1 pm with a two-week delay
- abn - Nagano Asahi TV - Started on January 8, 2009 at 1:15 am
- SATV - Shizuoka Asahi TV - Started April 18 at 1:55 am with a four-week delay
- NCC - Nagasaki Bunka TV - Started October 21, 2008 at 1:20 am
- BSS - Saiin Broadcasting - Started April 3, 2009 at 11:55 pm
