= Kyū Jō Show!! =

- Regular Edition Cover

Single by Kanjani8
- Released: November 4, 2009
- Genre: Pop
- Length: 37:59 (Regular Edition)
- Label: Imperial Records

Kanjani8 singles chronology
"Musekinin Hero" (2008)	"Kyū Jō Show!!" (2009)	"Gift ~White~" (2009)

Alternative covers
- Limited Edition A

Alternative cover
- Limited Edition B

"Kyū Jō Show!!" (急☆上☆Show!!, Kyū Jō Shō!!) is the tenth single released by the Japanese boyband Kanjani8. The single was released in 2009, the first single from the group since the release of "Musekinin Hero" more than a year prior. The single, like its predecessor, was released in three different editions. The regular edition contained the title track and three B-sides, while the limited editions only contained the title track, one B-side, and a DVD. It also marks the first time since the release of "Sukiyanen, Osaka" in 2005 that a PV DVD was included with one of the group's singles.

The B-side, "Hitotsu no Uta", is a recording from their July Kyocera Dome concert.

Band member You Yokoyama plays on the hidden gag in this single's release as the mysterious director of the television station that the band performs the title song at in the music video. The mysterious director also appears in the CD jacket of the regular edition CD single. The pun is based on Yokoyama's popularity boost due to his portrayal of an unstable television director in the Nihon Television prime time drama, The Quiz Show 2.

== Track listings ==
=== Regular edition ===
1. Kyū Jō Show!! (急☆上☆Show!!, "Suddenly Rising Show!!")
2. "Brilliant Blue"
3. "Cinematic"
4. "Hitotsu no Uta" (ひとつのうた, "One Song")
5. "Kyū Jō Show!! <Original Karaoke>"
6. "Brilliant Blue <Original Karaoke>"
7. "Cinematic <Original Karaoke>"
8. "Hitotsu no Uta <Original Karaoke>"

=== Limited edition A ===
1. "Kyū Jō Show!!"
2. "Hitotsu no Uta"

==== DVD ====
1. "Kyū Jō Show!!" (Music Clip)

=== Limited edition B ===
1. "Kyū Jō Show!!"
2. "Hitotsu no Uta"

==== DVD ====
1. "Hitotsu no Uta" (Music Clip)

== Charts ==
Week	Oricon Weekly	Peak Position	Sales Total
November 16, 2009	November Week 3	1	271,516
November 23, 2009	November Week 4	10	15,977
November 30, 2009	November Week 5	27	5,357
