= Full Throttle Girl =

- Also known as: Zenkai Girl
- Genre: Romantic comedy
- Written by: Tomoko Yoshida
- Directed by: Hideki Takeuchi
- Starring: Yui Aragaki; Ryo Nishikido
- Opening theme: Ai ga Aru by Every Little Thing
- Ending theme: Tsubusa ni Koi by Kanjani Eight
- Country of origin: Japan
- Original language: Japanese
- No. of episodes: 11

Production
- Production location: Japan
- Running time: 54 minutes, Mondays at 21:00 (JST)

Original release
- Network: Fuji Television
- Release: July 11 – September 19, 2011

Full Throttle Girl (全開ガール, Zenkai Gāru) is a 2011 Japanese television series that aired on Fuji Television from July 11 to September 19, 2011. It starred Yui Aragaki and Ryo Nishikido.

== Plot ==
Wakaba (Yui Aragaki) dreams of becoming an international lawyer making 10 billion Yen annually. Wakaba then gets a job at Samezima Sakuragawa law firm.

Wakaba's boss then unexpectedly assigns her to take care of her 5-year-old daughter Hinata. Wakaba, reluctant at first, accepts after learning it is for only three months. Wakaba then meets a man named Shota (Ryo Nishikido) again. She first met him in the subway. Wakaba mistakes Shota for a pervert. Nevertheless, love is soon to bloom between the two people ...

== Cast ==
=== Main cast ===
- Yui Aragaki as Wakaba Ayukawa
- Ryo Nishikido as Sota Yamada

=== Supporting cast ===
- Hiroyuki Hirayama as Kyoichi Shindo
- Hiroko Yakushimaru as Shoko Sakurakawa
- Misako Renbutsu as Soyoko Ushioda
- Ryohei Suzuki as Kentaro Nishino
- Jiro Sato as Morisu Sakota
- Sarutoki Minagawa as Hiroshi Torii
- Noriko Aoyama as Mika Kujo
- Yosiyosi Arakawa as Samao Hayashi
- Serai Takagi as Emitaro Yamada
- Kanon Tani as Hinata Sakurakawa
- Riki Takeuchi as Jin Hanamura
- Aiko Kaito as Urara Hanamura

=== Extended cast ===
- Hiroshi Kanbe as Hisao Ayukawa
- Reina Asami as Ririka
- Tomio Suga as Le Sato shopkeeper
- Seiko Sakurada as reporter (ep 1)
- Takaya Sakoda as doctor (ep 1)
- Hitoshi Ozawa as bill collector (ep 1)
- Shingo Toda as bill collector (ep 1)
- Ryo Kamon as client (ep 2)
- Asami Kumakiri (ep 3)
- Kinuwo Yamada (ep 3)
- Kokoro Hirasawa (ep 3)
- Mie Ohta (ep 3)
- Kouichi Ohori as Maison Paul Bocuse (ep 4)
- Kokoro Hirasawa (ep 5)
- Etsuko Nami (ep 5 and 8)
- Ryoka Ihara (ep 6)
- Sokyu Fujita as Kyoichi Shindo's father (ep 8)
- Maro Hiko (ep 9)
- Koko Mori as classmate (ep 11)
