= Gomen ne Seishun! =

- Also known as: Saving My Stupid Youth
- ごめんね青春!
- Genre: Drama, comedy
- Written by: Kankuro Kudo
- Directed by: Daisuke Yamamuro; Fuminori Kaneko; Ryosuke Fukuda
- Starring: Ryo Nishikido; Hikari Mitsushima
- Opening theme: Ittajanaika by Kanjani Eight
- Country of origin: Japan
- Original language: Japanese
- No. of episodes: 10

Production
- Producer: Aki Isoyama
- Production location: Mishima, Shizuoka
- Running time: 54 min (Japan)

Original release
- Network: TBS
- Release: 12 October – 21 December 2014

Gomen ne Seishun! (ごめんね青春!), also known as Saving My Stupid Youth, is a Japanese television drama written by Kankuro Kudo. The series was broadcast by TBS from 12 October to 21 December 2014.

== Plot ==
Heisuke Hara (Ryo Nishikido) teaches at his alma mater, an all-boys Buddhist high school, while being tormented with guilt by an act of misdemeanor from his high school days. Events unfold as the school plans to merge with an all-girls Catholic high school due to dwindling enrolment, and Heisuke's homeroom class was chosen to be merged with a class headed by Risa Hachiya (Hikari Mitsushima) as an experiment.

== Cast ==
- Ryo Nishikido as Heisuke Hara
- Hikari Mitsushima as Risa Hachiya
- Kento Nagayama as Satoshi Tsutaya
- Haru as Yuko Hachiya
- Daiki Shigeoka as Yuzuru Ebisawa
- Reina Triendl as Yamada Birkenstock Kyoko
- Rina Kawaei as Ai Jinbo
- Katsuhisa Namase as Daizaburo Sannomiya
- Maki Sakai as Mai Awashima
- Yuki Saito as Yoshie Yoshii
- Aoi Morikawa as Abe Amari
- Kazuki Enari as Ippei Hara
- Shizuka Nakamura as Erena Hara
