= Eight Ranger 2 =

- Theatrical release poster
- Directed by: Yukihiko Tsutsumi
- Starring: You Yokoyama; Subaru Shibutani; Shingo Murakami; Ryuhei Maruyama; Shota Yasuda; Ryo Nishikido; Tadayoshi Okura; Atsuko Maeda
- Release date: July 26, 2014 (Japan)
- Running time: 103 minutes
- Country: Japan
- Language: Japanese

Eight Ranger 2 (Japanese: エイトレンジャー2) is a 2014 Japanese action comedy film directed by Yukihiko Tsutsumi and the second film in the Kanjani Sentai Eightranger film series, following Eight Ranger (2012). It was released on 26 July 2014.

== Cast ==
- You Yokoyama
- Subaru Shibutani
- Shingo Murakami
- Ryuhei Maruyama
- Shota Yasuda
- Ryo Nishikido
- Tadayoshi Okura
- Atsuko Maeda
