= Eight Ranger =

- Theatrical release poster
- Directed by: Yukihiko Tsutsumi
- Written by: Yuya Takahashi
- Produced by: Kazuteru Harafuji; Shin Nakazawa
- Starring: You Yokoyama; Subaru Shibutani; Shingo Murakami; Ryuhei Maruyama; Shota Yasuda; Ryo Nishikido; Tadayoshi Okura; Hiroshi Tachi
- Cinematography: Shigetomo Madarame
- Edited by: Nobuyuki Ito
- Music by: Toru Hasebe
- Production companies: Toho; J Storm
- Distributed by: Toho
- Release date: 28 July 2012 (Japan)
- Running time: 110 minutes
- Country: Japan
- Language: Japanese

Eight Ranger (Japanese: エイトレンジャー, Hepburn: Eito Renjā) is a 2012 Japanese action comedy film directed by Yukihiko Tsutsumi starring the members of Japanese boy band Kanjani Eight.

== Cast ==
- You Yokoyama
- Subaru Shibutani
- Shingo Murakami
- Ryuhei Maruyama
- Shota Yasuda
- Ryo Nishikido
- Tadayoshi Okura
- Hiroshi Tachi
- Renji Ishibashi
- Ryuhei Ueshima
- Becky
- Misako Renbutsu
- Ryosei Tayama
- Hitomi Takahashi
- Naoto Takenaka
- Noriyuki Higashiyama

== See also ==
- Kanjani Sentai Eight Ranger
