= La La La at Rock Bottom =

2015 film by Nobuhiro Yamashita

- Film poster
- 味園ユニバース
- Directed by: Nobuhiro Yamashita
- Written by: Tomoe Kanno
- Produced by: Shinji Ogawa; Hiroyuki Negishi; Tsuyoshi Matsushita
- Starring: Subaru Shibutani; Fumi Nikaidō
- Cinematography: Fūta Takagi
- Edited by: Takashi Satoh
- Music by: Shoji Ikenaga
- Production companies: J Storm; GAGA Corporation; Matchpoint
- Release date: February 14, 2015 (Japan)
- Running time: 103 minutes
- Country: Japan
- Language: Japanese
- Box office: ¥55.2 million

La La La at Rock Bottom (Japanese: 味園ユニバース) is a 2015 Japanese music youth drama film directed by Nobuhiro Yamashita. It was released on February 14, 2015.

== Cast ==
- Subaru Shibutani
- Fumi Nikaidō

== Reception ==
The film has grossed ¥55.2 million at the Japanese box office.

== Awards ==
- Fantasia International Film Festival 2015 - Best Actor (Subaru Shibutani), Best Screenwriter (Tomoe Kanno)
