= Hiroshi Tachi =

Japanese actor and singer (born 1950)

- 舘ひろし
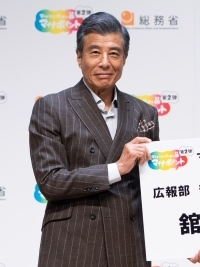
- Born: March 31, 1950 (age 76); Nagoya, Japan
- Occupations: Actor, singer
- Years active: 1975–present
- Website: tachipro.jp/hiroshi-tachi/data.html

Hiroshi Tachi (舘 ひろし, Tachi Hiroshi; born 31 March 1950 in Naka-ku, Nagoya) is a Japanese actor and singer.

His ancestors were samurai of the Owari Domain and the family of the former samurai.

He graduated from Chiba Institute of Technology. He was a leader of a rock 'n' roll group Cools but he left the group soon after he joined Toei film company and made his film debut with The Classroom of Terror. In 1983, he moved to Yujiro Ishiharas production company. In the 1980s, he won great popularity through his roles in the TV drama series Seibu Keisatsu and Abunai Deka.

In 2018, Tachi won the Best Actor award at the 42nd Montreal World Film Festival for his role in Owatta Hito.

As a singer Tachi is known for his hit song Nakanaide and appeared in the Kōhaku Uta Gassen twice.

== Filmography ==
=== Film ===
- The Classroom of Terror (1976)
- New Female Convict Scorpion Special: Block X (1977)
- Never Give up (1978), Nariaki Oba
- Abunai Deka (1987), Toshiki "Taka" Takayama
- Mata Mata Abunai Deka (1988), Toshiki "Taka" Takayama
- Mottomo Abunai Deka (1989), Toshiki "Taka" Takayama
- I Don't Have a License! (1994), Hiroshi Nanjo
- Abunai Deka Returns (1996), Toshiki "Taka" Takayama
- Abunai Deka Forever: The Movie (1998), Toshiki "Taka" Takayama
- Mada Mada Abunai Deka (2005), Toshiki "Taka" Takayama
- Eight Ranger (2012)
- Dangerous Cops: Final 5 Days (2016), Toshiki "Taka" Takayama
- Life in Overtime (2018)
- The Great War of Archimedes (2019), Isoroku Yamamoto
- A Family (2021)
- Fullmetal Alchemist: The Revenge of Scar (2022), King Bradley/Wrath
- Fullmetal Alchemist: The Final Alchemy (2022), King Bradley/Wrath
- Golden Kamuy (2024), Hijikata Toshizō
- The Parades (2024)
- Dangerous Cops: Home Coming (2024), Toshiki "Taka" Takayama
- A Light in the Harbor (2025)
- Golden Kamuy: The Abashiri Prison Raid (2026), Hijikata Toshizō
- Goodbye My Car (2026), Hiroshi Nanjo
- Bad Lieutenant: Tokyo (2026)

=== Television ===
- Seibu Keisatsu (1979–84), first appears as Soutaro Tatsumi; nicknamed 'Tatsu' by his colleagues but dies in Episode 30 of Part I. Later appears as Eiji Hatomura, nicknamed 'Hato'.
- Abunai Deka (1986–89), Toshiki "Taka" Takayama
- Seibu Keisatsu Special (2004)
- Kōmyō ga Tsuji (2006), Oda Nobunaga
- Papa to Musume no Nanokakan (2007), Kawahara Kyōichirō/ Kawahara Kōume
- Clouds Over the Hill (2010), Shimamura Hayao
- Jun and Ai (2012–13), Shin'ichirō Ōsaki
- Keisei Saimin no Otoko Part 1 (2015), Inukai Tsuyoshi
- Natsume Sōseki no Tsuma (2016), Shigekazu Nakane
- Golden Kamuy: The Hunt of Prisoners in Hokkaido / Karafuto Pursuit Arc (2024–27), Hijikata Toshizō

=== Anime ===
- Golgo 13 (2008–2009), Duke Togo/Golgo 13

=== Video games ===
- Yakuza 2 (2006), Ryō Takashima

== Discography ==
Hiroshi Tachi has released the following albums during his musical career.

=== Studio albums ===
- Golden Shadow (1 April 1988)
- Impressions (21 December 1988)
- 異邦人 (Gentile) (2 March 1994)

=== Compilation ===
- Tachi – The Best (12 May 1993)
- Tachi – The Best Collection (2 November 2005)

== Awards and honors ==
Year	Honors	Ref.
2020	Order of the Rising Sun, 4th Class, Gold Rays with Rosette	

Year	Award	Category	Work(s)	Result	Ref.
2018	42nd Montreal World Film Festival	Best Actor	Life in Overtime	Won	
2018	31st Nikkan Sports Film Awards	Best Actor	Life in Overtime	Nominated	
2019	61st Blue Ribbon Awards	Best Actor	Life in Overtime	Won	
2019	42nd Japan Academy Film Prize	Best Actor	Life in Overtime	Nominated	
2021	34th Nikkan Sports Film Awards	Best Supporting Actor	A Family	Nominated	
2021	46th Hochi Film Awards	Best Supporting Actor	A Family	Nominated	
2022	64th Blue Ribbon Awards	Best Supporting Actor	A Family	Nominated	
2026	68th Blue Ribbon Awards	Best Actor	A Light in the Harbor	Nominated	
