= Niini no Koto o Wasurenaide =

- Genre: Family
- Created by: Original novel by Masumi Kawakami
- Starring: See below
- Country of origin: Japan
- Original language: Japanese
- No. of episodes: 1

Production
- Producers: Futoshi Ohira, Toshiaki Naniwa, Naoyuki Nakano
- Production location: Tokyo

Original release
- Network: NTV
- Release: August 29, 2009

Niini no Koto o Wasurenaide (にぃにのことを忘れないで, Don't Forget About Niini) is a Japanese drama that was broadcast on NTV on August 29, 2009 and starred Ryo Nishikido in the title role. The special was based on a true story and the original novel of the same name by Kawakami Masumi.

== Synopsis ==
Keisuke Kawai (Ryo Nishikido) is a young man who aspired to become a physicist since he was young. His hopeful parents send him to an expensive college prep school, but at the age of 15, during his third year of junior high, he is diagnosed with a brain tumor. Told that he only has one year to live, he falls into despair, giving up on treatment and even lashing out against his own mother.

== Cast ==
- Ryo Nishikido as Keisuke Kawai
- Tanaka Rena as Shiori Amami
- Ryosuke Yamada as Yuji Kawai
- Yumi Shirakawa as Chiyo Kawai
- Hitomi Kuroki as Kasumi Kawai
- Takanori Jinnai as Yoichi Kawai
- Makiya Yamaguchi as Hirofumi Doi
- Yorie Yamashita as doctor
- Yuta Kanai
- Yusuke Yamazaki
- Naoto Kinosaki
- Yuji Ishikawa

== Notes ==
The drama was the Special for NTV's 24Hour Television event.
