= Seiran Kobayashi =

Japanese actress (born 2004)

- 小林 星蘭
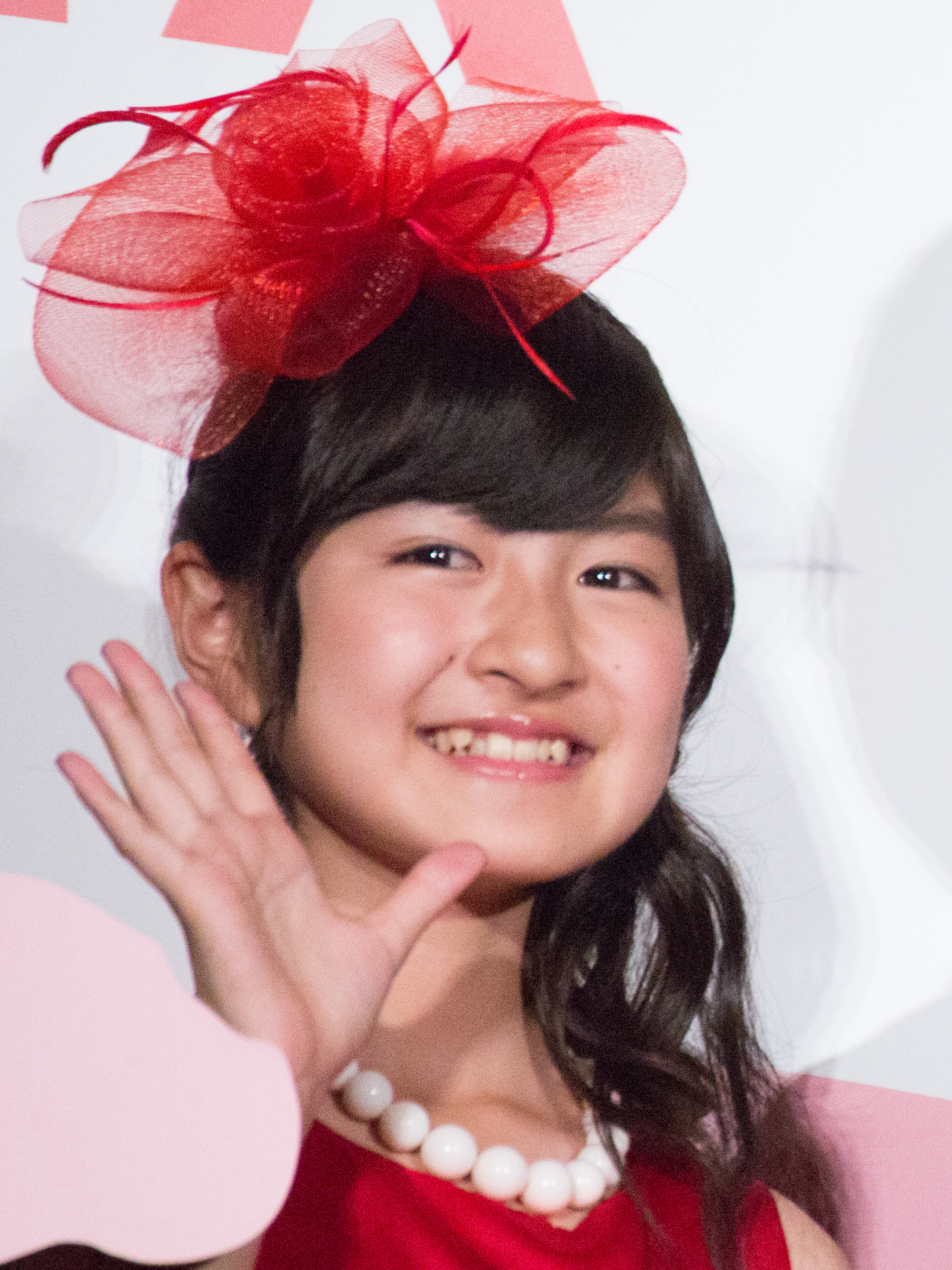
- Kobayashi in 2017
- Born: 25 September 2004 (age 22); Tokyo, Japan
- Occupation: Actress
- Years active: 2009–present
- Agent: Theatre Academy

Seiran Kobayashi (小林 星蘭, Kobayashi Seiran; born 25 September 2004) is a Japanese actress.

== Career ==
Kobayashi first appeared on TV in a commercial for Calpis in 2009, and subsequently gained popularity as a child actress in Japanese TV dramas such as Yōkame no Semi and Natsu no Koi wa Nijiiro ni Kagayaku in 2010, and Wataru Seken wa Oni Bakari and Namae o Nakushita Megami in 2011.

== Filmography ==
=== Live-action film ===
- You can Dance, Natsu (君が踊る、夏, Kimi ga Odoru, Natsu) (2010)
- Spotlight (2012)

=== Animated film ===
- Okko's Inn (2018), Oriko Seki
- Star Wars: Visions (2021), Lop
- The Tunnel to Summer, the Exit of Goodbyes (2022), Karen Tōno
- The Ribbon Hero (2026), Pine

=== Japanese dub ===
- The Peanuts Movie (2015), Sally Brown
- The Lion King (2019), Young Nala

=== Television ===
- Samayoi Zakura (サマヨイザクラ) (Fuji TV, 2009)
- Challenged (チャレンジド) (NHK, 2009)
- Sotsu Uta (卒うた) (Fuji TV, 2010)
- Yōkame no Semi (八日目の蝉) (NHK, 2010)
- Rikon Syndrome (離婚シンドローム) (NTV, 2010)
- Natsu no Koi wa Nijiiro ni Kagayaku (夏の恋は虹色に輝く) (Fuji TV, 2010)
- Asu mo Mata Ikite Ikō (明日もまた生きていこう) (TBS, 2010)
- Control: Hanzai Shinri Sōsa (CONTROL〜犯罪心理捜査〜) (Fuji TV, 2011)
- Wataru Seken wa Oni Bakari (渡る世間は鬼ばかり) (TBS, 2011)
- Namae o Nakushita Megami (名前をなくした女神) (Fuji TV, 2011)
- Mi o Tsukushi Ryōrichō (みをつくし料理帖) (TV Asahi, 2012)
- Ikkyu-san (一休さん) (Fuji TV, 2012), as Sayo
- Paji (ぱじ) (TV Tokyo, 2013), as Momo
- Ikkyu-san 2 (一休さん2) (Fuji TV, 2013)
- Gekiryu: Watashi o Oboete Imasuka? (激流～私を憶えていますか？～) (NHK, 2013)
- Space Dandy (スペース☆ダンディ, Supēsu Dandi) (Tokyo MX, 2014) – Erssime (voice)
- Peter no Soretsu (ペテロの葬列) (TBS, 2014) – Momoko Sugimura
- Shuriken Sentai Ninninger (手裏剣戦隊ニンニンジャー) (TV Asahi, 2015) – Elena
- My Hero Academia (僕のヒーローアカデミア) (NNS, 2019-) – Eri

== Discography ==
=== Singles ===
Kobayashi and Kanon Tani released two music singles as part of the duo "Star Flower".

- "Toshishita no Otokonoko" (August 2012), cover of the 1975 song by the Candies
- "White Love" (December 2012), cover of the 1997 number-one song by Speed

No.	Title	Release date	Charts			Notes
No.	Title	Release date	JPN Oricon	JPN Hot 100	JPN RIAJ	Notes
1	"Toshishita no Otokonoko (年下の男の子) (with Kanon Tani as the duo Star Flower)	1 August 2012	62	—	—	Music video
2	"White Love" (with Kanon Tani as the duo Star Flower)	26 December 2012	131			Music video
