= Joker: Yurusarezaru Sōsakan =

- Genre: Crime drama
- Developed by: Hideaki Tatematsu; Masaru Ōta
- Written by: Shōgo Mutō
- Directed by: Masato Hijikata; Junichi Tsuzuki; Junichi Ishikawa
- Starring: Masato Sakai; Ryō Nishikido; Anne
- Ending theme: "Scar" by RIP SLYME
- Composer: Akio Izutsu
- Country of origin: Japan
- No. of episodes: 10

Production
- Producers: Hideki Inada; Reiko Nagai
- Running time: 45–60 minutes
- Production companies: Fuji TV; Kyodo Television

Original release
- Network: Fuji TV
- Release: 13 July – 14 September 2010

Joker: Yurusarezaru Sōsakan (Japanese: ジョーカー 許されざる捜査官; Joker: Unforgiven Investigator) is a 2010 Japanese crime drama television series developed by Hideaki Tatematsu and Masaru Ōta from Fuji TV and Kyodo Television respectively. It stars Masato Sakai in his first leading role as mild-mannered detective Date Kazuyoshi of the Kanagawa Prefectural Police, Investigation Division 1. Starring alongside Sakai is Ryō Nishikido and Anne Watanabe, the latter using the mononym "Anne".

== Cast ==
=== Main characters ===
- Masato Sakai as Date Kazuyoshi
- Ryō Nishikido as Takeshi Kudō
- Anne Watanabe as Asuka Miyagi

=== Supporting characters ===
- Hiroyuki Hirayama as Junnosuke Kurusu
- Ryō as Saeko Katagiri
- Ren Osugi as Kuniharu Mikami
- Takeshi Kaga as Masaaki Izutsu

== Home media ==
A DVD box set for the series was released on January 19, 2011. Bonus materials include a behind-the-scenes featurette, an interview with the cast, textless ending sequence, and the series trailer.
