= Kanon Tani =

Japanese actress and tarento (born 2004)

- 谷 花音
- Born: May 4, 2004 (age 22); Saitama Prefecture, Japan
- Occupations: Actress; tarento
- Years active: 2007–present
- Employer: Theatre Academy
- Known for: TV dramas: Namae o Nakushita Megami; Full Throttle Girl; Papadol!
- Height: 1.54 m (5 ft 1 in)
- Website: Profile at Theatre Academy

Kanon Tani (谷 花音, Tani Kanon; born May 4, 2004) is a Japanese actress and tarento. She received a certificate for Guinness World Record on behalf of a fashion show organized by T-ARTS Company Ltd, in which 1,274 participants modelled on a catwalk. She has a younger sister Karin, who was born in 2009.

== Filmography ==
=== Television ===
- Boku no Imōto (ぼくの妹) (TBS) (Ep. 3, 3 May 2009)
- Oyaji no Ichiban Nagai Hi (親父の一番長い日) (Fuji TV, 19 June 2009)
- Natsu no Koi wa Nijiiro ni Kagayaku (夏の恋は虹色に輝く) (Fuji TV, 2010)
- Film Factory's series Eigo Rhythm (FILM FACTORY 「えいごリズム」) (TV Tokyo, 3 — 24 March 2010)
- Utsukushi Rinjin (美しい隣人) (Fuji TV, 2011)
- Propose Kyodai (プロポーズ兄弟〜生まれ順別 男が結婚する方法〜) (Fuji TV, 2011)
- Namae o Nakushita Megami (名前をなくした女神) (Fuji TV, 2011)
- Full Throttle Girl (or Zenkai Girl) (Fuji TV, 2011)
- Ikemen Desu ne (TBS, 2011) (Ep. 1)
- Renai Neet: Wasureta Koi no Hajimekata (TBS, 2012) (Ep. 1)
- Papadol! (パパドル!) (TBS, 2012)
- Mi o Tsukushi Ryōrichō (みをつくし料理帖) (TV Asahi, 2012)
- Yorozu Uranai Dokoro Onmyōya e Yōkoso (よろず占い処 陰陽屋へようこそ) (Kansai TV) (Ep. 10, 10 December 2013)
- Yume o Ataeru (夢を与える) (WOWOW, 2015)
- Anohana: The Flower We Saw That Day (Fuji TV, 2015) — Menma (child)

=== Film ===
- Jōkyō Monogatari (2013) — Saki
- Jōkyō Monogatari (2013) — I Hate Tokyo
- Mixed Doubles (2017) — Nanami Hadika

=== Anime films ===
- Your Name (2016) — Yotsuha Miyamizu
- Lu over the Wall (2017) — Lu
- Weathering with You (2019) — Yotsuha Miyamizu

=== Dubbing ===
- The Peanuts Movie (2015) — Lucy van Pelt

== Discography ==
=== Singles ===
Tani and Seiran Kobayashi released two music singles as part of the duo Star Flower (すたーふらわー).

- "Toshishita no Otokonoko" (August 2012), cover of the 1975 song by the Candies
- "White Love" (December 2012), cover of the 1997 number-one song by Speed

No.	Title	Release date	Charts			Notes
No.	Title	Release date	JPN Oricon	JPN Hot 100	JPN RIAJ	Notes
1	"Toshishita no Otokonoko" (年下の男の子; "Younger Boy") (with Seiran Kobayashi as the duo Star Flower)	August 1, 2012	62	—	—	Music video
2	"White Love" (with Seiran Kobayashi as the duo Star Flower)	December 26, 2012	131			Music video
