= Super Eight (group) =

Japanese boy band

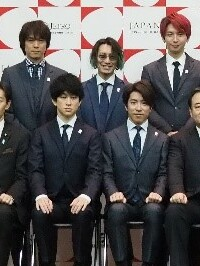

Background information
- Also known as: Kanjani Eight (2002–2024)
- Origin: Osaka, Japan
- Genres: Pop; enka; rock
- Years active: 2002–present
- Labels: Teichiku Records; Imperial Records; Infinity Records
- Members: You Yokoyama; Shingo Murakami; Ryuhei Maruyama; Shota Yasuda; Tadayoshi Okura
- Past members: Hiroki Uchi; Subaru Shibutani; Ryo Nishikido
- Website: www.infinity-r.jp starto.jp/s/p/artist/13

Super Eight (スーパー エイト, Sūpā Eito; stylized as SUPER EIGHT), previously known as Kanjani Eight (関ジャニ∞(エイト), Kanjani Eito; stylized as Kanjani∞) is a five-member Japanese boy band from Japan's Kansai region. They are managed by the multimedia talent agency Starto Entertainment (formerly Johnny & Associates) and signed to Infinity Records. The group was formed in 2002 and made their CD debut in 2004 as "Johnny's modern enka group", though after the year 2006, their sound and style has become a mix of pop and rock. Like the rest of the acts managed under Johnny & Associates, Super Eight also perform in various other areas of the Japanese entertainment industry such as variety show hosting, television, movie, and stage acting, and radio talk show hosting. They sold 17 million copies in Japan. Starting on February 4, 2024, the group's name changed to Super Eight, following the decisions taken at the agency to eliminate "Johnny" from everything related to the group in the wake of the Johnny Kitagawa sexual abuse scandal.

== History ==
=== Combination of two groups: 2002–2003 ===
Kanjani Eight was the combination of the four top leading Kansai Johnny's Jr. of the "Junior golden age" and the newly popular V. West (Five West), a rock band Kansai Junior unit. Prior to the creation of the group, Subaru Shibutani, Yuu Yokoyama, Shingo Murakami, and Ryo Nishikido were one of the top leading juniors of the time, headlining many Junior hosted programs and acting in dramas. After the debuts of Arashi and Tackey & Tsubasa, the golden era was suddenly coming to an end and so was their popularity. By the year 2001 all their activity had slowed down to magazine photoshoots.

On the contrary, a new Kansai Junior unit named V. West was taking off in popularity, more so than their eastern counterpart FiVe. The group consisted of Ryuhei Maruyama, Shota Yasuda, Hiroki Uchi, Kiyohito Mizuno, and Tooru Imayama. The group became so popular that by 2001 they had their own television show, Weekly V. West. But, when Mizuno and Imayama left Johnny's & Associates, worry had begun to creep within unit as to their fate within the talent agency.

In 2002, after the end of Weekly V. West, a new program was created to replace it on Kansai TV Channel 8 entitled J3Kansai (pronounced as J Cube Kansai). This show brought together the top leading Kansai Juniors of the golden age and V. West creating the new Junior group, Kanjani, a portmanteau of the words Kansai Johnny's. With the success of the stage play, Another, the group became official garnering the name Kanjani Eight. The "8" stood for the channel that the show J3Kansai aired on. Tadayoshi Ohkura had been added to the group as a drummer and then as an official member in the 12 episode finalizing the group as an eight-member group.

Kanjani Eight, as a newly formed group, held their first concert in December 2002, titled " Kanjani Eight Xmas Party 2002 ". This concert ended up becoming a yearly tradition before ending in 2005. It was also the birthplace of the group's signature act, Kanjani Sentai Eight Ranger.

In 2003, Kanjani Eight members Nishikido and Uchi were called to go to Tokyo to become a part of NEWS, another Johnny & Associates group.

=== Debut: 2004–2005 ===
Although Nishikido and Uchi were already members of NEWS, they went on to also debut as members of Kanjani Eight when the group released their debut single titled "Naniwa Iroha Bushi" in the Kansai area on August 25, 2004. The single became a local hit, capturing the traditional feel of their hometown region through the pop-enka tune. Shibutani had said, in regards to the feel of the song, " The song has a Kawachi Workman's bass, so it's entirely something new. It'd make me happy to see others dancing when they hear it." Despite the release of the CD, their debut was lackluster, leaving many to question if the debut actually was real. The members themselves had found out of the debut through a newspaper article; Shibutani had said that he was "very surprised" when he found out.

Even though there was questions about the group's debut, "Naniwa Iroha Bushi" had risen to the number-one spot on the Oricon's Enka charts and reaching number-eight on the Oricon's generic music charts. When the single made its nationwide debut on September 22, it had hit number-one on both the Oricon Enka and General Music charts.

Much of 2004 activities were Kansai region focused in comparison their fellow acts who had the luxuries of nationwide exposure. Kanjani Eight had become hometown idols with majority of their popularity within the region but outside the area they were almost unknown. The release of their second single, "Osaka Rainy Blues", further exemplified the fact with the CD single debuting number-nine on the Oricon. To this date, "Osaka Rainy Blues" is the group's lowest single in sales.

2005 had marked the launch of Kanjani Eight's popularity even though it had opened up with the lackluster sales of their second single, "Osaka Rainy Blues". The group had been starring in three regular programs, now being aired nationwide, and were starting to get recognition as a debut Johnny's act. But with growing success came a scandal and in 2005 Hiroki Uchi was arrested for disorderly conduct and underage drinking, being 18 at the time.

The scandal had a significant impact on Kanjani Eight as well as NEWS, the other group he was active in. Johnny's & Associates removed Uchi from both units and put him under an indefinite hiatus from all activities. Also, the drama special about the World War II Kamikaze pilots starring the group, Yakusoku, was canceled. Kanjani Eight continued on that year to do their first Osaka-jō Hall performance with one member less in the summer of 2005.

=== KJ1 F.T.O: 2006 ===
After the nationwide exposure and scandal in 2005, Kanjani Eight were pushing forward without looking back. Their late 2005 single, "Sukiyanen, Osaka/Oh! Enka/Mugendai" had shown signs of the group's growing success opening at number-two on the Weekly Oricon charts and in March 2006, the group had released their first nationwide debut album, KJ1 F.T.O, the title standing for Kanjani 1: Funky Town Osaka. The album had hit number-two on the Oricon on its debut.

Now known nationally and having an official album release under their belts, Kanjani Eight had begun their first tour. Named after the album's title, the F.T.O.N, Funky Tokyo Osaka Nagoya, concert tour spanned the three cities for six days and twenty performances in total. Soon after the small spring concert tour, the band launched their first nationwide tour, entitled Nationwide 1-St Tour 2006 followed up with a part two winter concert which was appropriately named after the release of their first number-one single, "Kan Fu Fighting". Both tours were a total of 46 performances.

As with all Johnny's, music and television appearances were not the only thing on the group's active schedule. 2006 had also marked the acting debut leads for Ohkura, Maruyama, and Yasuda. By the end of 2006, the group had been in more than four dramas including the Kansai TV drama special showcasing the entire band in three separate stories.

Kanjani Eight have also been active in several stage plays, returning once again for the third year in a row to headline the popular Johnny's & Associates produced play, Dream Boys, with KAT-TUN. This year also marked the end of their summer special stage play series with the return of Another as Another's Another. Their final summer special stage play had a total of 58 performances and marked the last time Kanjani Eight would ever perform at Osaka Shochiku-za Theater.

=== KJ2 Zukkoke Dai Dassō: 2007 ===
2007 would be marked as the year of Kanjani Eight's success as a group and as a Johnny. The year had opened up with the chart-topping single, "Kan Fu Fighting", which was then followed by the release of their second single, "Zukkoke Otoko Michi". "Zukkoke Otoko Michi" debuted at number-one on the Weekly Charts and number-three for the month of April. The single went later on to be the number-one8 top selling single of 2007. Despite the popularity of the song, it still wasn't as substantial as the success of "Kanfuu Fighting" which had been number-nine on the 2007 yearly charts.

The release of "Zukkoke Otoko Michi" also marked the change of labels from Teichiku Records to its subsidiary, Imperial Records partly due to the change of sound that the band had. Teichiku is an Enka label and the change to Imperial allowed the band to be on a label with a broader sound as Imperial is Teichiku Entertainment's pop/rock label.

June 2007 was the release of their second full-length album, KJ2 Zukkoke Dai Dassō. The album was a significant departure in sound from their first release, focusing the funk and rock side of things, but still didn't stop record sales as it had debut number-one on the Oricon and number-two overall for the month of June.

Majority of 2007 was spent on the road as the group had opened up 2007 holding a concert series as Kyocera Dome entitled Eh?! Honma?! Bikkuri!! Dome Concert in Osaka (Eh? Really?! Shocking!!). The concert tour was extended to a full-length nationwide tour of the same name, breaking records of being the first pop group ever to perform in all 47 prefectures in the same concert tour. The Eh! Honma! Bikkuri!! Tour 2007 had lasted five months and was a total of 113 performances.

In between all the concert activities, many members in Kanjani Eight were involved in other side projects. Yokoyama had starred in the Fuji TV drama, Haikei, Chihiue-sama (拝啓、父上様, Dear, Father) as well as the drama adaptation of the manga, Yūkan Club. Nishikido had starred in the Attention Please drama special and in 1 Liter of Tears. Ohkura had a role in the franchise revival of Hissatsu Shigotonin as well as a supporting role in the TBS drama, Utahime. Maruyama also held a role in the TBS special, Wachigaiya Itosato (輪違屋糸里).

Directly following up the concert was the release of their seventh single, "It's My Soul". The song had followed the style of its preceding single and album, and managed to hit number-one on the Oricon in its debut week and number-two overall for the month of October. The single managed to hit twenty-second most sold single of 2007.

2007 had ended with the release of the documentary photobook and the concert DVD, 47, which was from the Tokyo Dome performance of their nationwide 2007 tour. 47 ended up becoming the top selling music DVD of 2008 on the Oricon charts, staying on for a solid 57 weeks.

=== Puzzle: 2008–2009 ===
2008 continued the flow of the band's high-speed activity for the first half of the year. The release of their eighth single, "Wahaha!!", met with success reaching number-one on the Weekly Oricon charts, Billboard Japan Hot 100, Billboard Japan Hot Single Sales, and reaching number-two7 on the top singles of 2008 (Oricon).

Right after their 4-city, 24-performance spring tour, Kanjani Eight hosted the NTV special, Touch! Eco 2008: Ashita no Tame ni... 55 no Chōsen? Special (Touch! eco 2008 明日のために...55の挑戦?スペシャル, Touch! Eco: For the Sake of Tomorrow... 55 Challenges? Special), a 13-hour television special spreading the awareness of ecology and the impact of energy waste and littering to the planet. Soon after, they hosted the sequel to their variety special, Sore Yuke! Daidaman, Daidaman Z.

Much of 2008 after June was spent with mild activities from the group. After the successful summer tour, the group released their ninth single, "Musekinin Hero". The single marked a milestone in the group's rising stardom by breaking over 300,000 units sold. The single had reached number-one on the charts and number-eleven on the 2008 yearly charts.

In 2009, Kanjani Eight had released their third album Puzzle after nearly two years since the release of Zukkoke Dai Dassō. Puzzle was a complete departure in sound compared to their previous two albums, containing more of mixture of R&B, rock, and pop songs. The album took only three months to complete and was released in April instantly garnering the number-one spot on the Oricon. The album ended up the number-one best-selling album in the first half 2009. After a very successful concert tour, a DVD was released from their Tokyo Dome performance. The DVD had reached number-one on the General and Music DVD Oricon charts.

Their tenth single, "Kyū Jō Show!!", was released in November after nearly a year since their last single. The CD single hit number-one on the Oricon weekly charts and number-two overall for the month of November, despite the number-one spot, it did not beat the success of "Musekinin Hero".

In December 2009, Kanjani Eight released their eleventh, twelfth, and thirteenth single. "Gift" was released as three separate singles, white, red and green, with different songs on each one. The single release is the band's first Christmas themed song and is said by the group to be a "Gift to the fans". It was released on the day before Christmas Eve (White), Christmas Eve (Red), and Christmas Day (Green). With these releases, Kanjani Eight became the first (and so far only) group to occupy the top three spots in the Oricon singles chart at once.

=== 8Uppers: 2010 ===
In a news article concerning Hiroki Uchi becoming involved with the Japanese production of Guys and Dolls, the president of Johnny & Associates, Johnny Kitagawa, stated that Uchi has been permanently removed from both Kanjani Eight and NEWS and will instead focus on solo work and acting.

It was announced on July 6, 2010, that the group's fourteenth single "Wonderful World!!" debuted at number-one on the Oricon weekly singles chart. Kanjani Eight released their fifteenth single "Life (Me no Mae no Mukō e)" (LIFE 〜目の前の向こうへ〜) on August 25, 2010, and it went on to top the Oricon weekly singles chart.

=== Fight: 2011 ===
2011 opened up with a triple single release from the group. T.W.L/Yellow Pansy Street was the first; a double-A side single that was released on April 20, 2011. Yellow Pansy Street served as the theme song to the 19th Shin-chan movie, The Storm Called: Operation Golden Spy and T.W.L was the 14th theme song for the animated show. The single immediately shot to no. 1 on the Oricon charts. Ohkura and Murakami both guest starred in the theatrical movie as two bumbling anti-heroes whom Shin-chan unexpectedly gets in their way. Following that release, in March 2011, Kanjani Eight released the second single in the series of releases with My Home. This single was the theme song to Nishikido's TV Asahi drama, Inu wo Kau to Iu koto ~Sky to Waga ga Uchi no 180 Nichi ~. The triple release project was concluded with the single titled, 365 Nichi Kazoku, which was the theme song to Ohkura's TBS drama, Umareru. Both singles earned the top spot on the Oricon charts and remained on the charts for 13 weeks respectively.

On April 6, 2011, Kanjani Eight was announced to be the hosts of the 34th annual 24 Hour Television, a televised charity event produced by NTV. After the devastating March 11 Touhoku tsunami and earthquake, Kanjani Eight were selected because the members themselves were affected by the 1995 Hanshin earthquake, nearly 16 years earlier. Murakami commented, in regards to being selected to host the fund raising event, " Now it's our turn to return the favor ", in regards to the help given to them during the 1995 quake. Yokoyama stated, " I can still remember the screams and the parents protecting us. We, Kanjani8, have experienced a devastating earthquake, but today Kobe and Osaka are doing great. I want to convey to the people of Touhoku how if we become one we can overcome (anything)!" The theme for that year's 24 Hour Television was, " Strength ", in response to the perseverance of the victims of the 2011 earthquake.

In July 2011, all the members of Kanjani Eight were announced to appear in the 24 Hour Television drama special titled, Ikiteru dake de nankurunai sa. It had already been announced that Murakami Shingo had the leading role and Shibutani Subaru had the supporting role as his friend since childhood, but it was revealed on July 19 that everyone else in Kanjani Eight would make an appearance in the drama. This was a historical first for the charity event as only one member of the hosting group would star in the special. The drama aired the night of August 20, 2011, during the 24 Hour Television broadcast. It was later released on DVD on November 26, 2011.

Continuing their string of activities and national exposure, it was announced on August 18, 2011, that Kanjani Eight's television show, Kanjani no Shiwake Eight, would now become an hour-long Golden Time variety. The show was currently airing at the late night time slot of Wednesdays at 1:21 am for thirty minutes. But now the show would air every Saturday at 7:58 pm starting in September. This was the first variety show that the group hosted that was now in a Golden Time slot. Shibutani commented, "To have a golden time program is a major landmark. I'm glad to have this dream realized".

Also announced, on that same day, the group would be going on a four baseball dome tour in support of their fifth album, Fight. This tour marked the first time that the group performed at Sapporo Dome and Fukuoka Yahoo! Japan Dome. Murakami stated, " We (Kanjani8) talked about how other groups have done concerts (there) and how we wanted to do that as well. " In September 2011, an additional stop was added to the tour schedule; Nagoya Dome for a Christmas Eve performance. This made Kanjani8 to be the fourth Johnny & Associates signed talent to perform at 5 major domes. Though, the worries of the recent earthquake did not go unnoticed by the members. Subaru remarked with, "How are we going to do this year's tour? It's going to happen but how should we go about it? I've been thinking a lot about it [...] I want to spread my thanks, when people watch this live, I want them to become invigorated. I believe in the connecting spirit of Japan."

On October 7, 2011, Nishikido withdrew from NEWS to focus on activities with Kanjani8. Nishikido had been in both groups for 8 years up to that point and the schedule conflicts of being in two different idol groups were becoming to be too much for him. On the October 14, 2011, episode of Music Station, Nishikido gave his reason behind his departure, "I'm sure there's a lot of you who are shocked, but, things like scheduling between the two groups was a problem that was worrying me. Now, I'm going to continue my best as Nishikido Ryo of Kanjani8. Please, also, continue to support the new NEWS as well as Yama P."

Their fifth album, Fight, was released on November 17, 2011, and reached no. 1 on the Oricon charts with a total of 253,524 units sold. Monjai Beat served as the supporting track for the album and promotion began in October and continued throughout the rest of the year. The album closed out the year as the 21st top sold album of 2011. Fight was later certified platinum by the Recording Industry Association of Japan.

=== 8EST: The 8th Anniversary: 2012–present ===
On January 1, 2012, during Kanjani8's yearly countdown concert at Kyocera dome, the group announced their 8th anniversary after the New Year's celebrations. A large sign was displayed on the overhead LED screens congratulating the group on 8 years. Because of how significant the number 8 is to the group's image and namesake, the 8th anniversary was a milemarker celebration for their career. The concert also kicked off the return of the Eight Rangers, the group appearing on stage in their suits during the final encore of the performance.

To mark the beginning of the 8th anniversary celebrations, in February 2012 it was announced that Ryo Nishikido would star in a drama titled, Papa wa Idol or, officially in English, My Papa is an Idol. It was also announced that Kanjani Eight themselves would appear in the drama to add to the 8th anniversary celebrations. The goal of the drama was to blur the lines between reality and fiction, so TBS dedicated some of their prime time programming to coincide with the events going on within the drama. To even further blur the lines, the entire cast performed a real wedding at a chapel which was broadcast on live television prior to the premiere of the drama. A Golden Week special aired in May, tying into the Papadoru theme, in which the members of Kanjani Eight split into teams of two to assume the roles as fathers and take care of children. Yasuda Shota was the only one not in a team and filmed his segment in Papua New Guinea.

In early March, a movie adaptation of the fan-favorite skit, Eight Ranger, was announced. The movie was to be directed by Tsutsumi Yukihiko, known for his 20th Century Boys movie series and drama work on Ikebukuro West Gate Park and SPEC. The movie would take a more grim and darker approach to the otherwise childish skits, introducing characters with alcoholism and gambling addiction. Shortly after the movie announcement, it was later revealed that the movie production would collaborate with the Papadoru production. Various other tie ins and collaborations followed with different companies such as 7-Eleven, Sanrio, Scalabo, and others. The movie was released in theaters on July 28, 2012.

The first of Kanjani Eight's anniversary singles were announced on April 3, 2012. Titled Ai Deshita, it served as the theme song for the TBS drama Papadoru. Filming for the promotional video as well as CD jacket art and promotional materials were incorporated into the actual drama. The group performed the song, live, in the final episode. The June release date was announced on April 17 and the CD track listing was announced in May. Ai Deshita. was the number one top selling single on the Oricon charts upon release and stayed on the charts for a total of 15 weeks making it their 7th consecutive single to reach number one.

The second of Kanjani Eight's anniversary singles was announced shortly after the release of "Ai Deshita", on June 21, 2012, titled "ER". It would serve as the theme song to movie, Eight Rangers. What made this single unique from the rest was that it was released under the pseudonym, Eight Rangers, rather than the group name. It was revealed that the single would go on sale on July 25, 2012; three days before the actual movie would have its nationwide release. The single had three versions, two of the versions including the music video for the A-side, directed by Tsutsumi Yukihiko. Track listing also included a longer, studio version of the song, "∞Rangers", which was used as theme song for the concert skits. The single, upon release, reached number one on the Oricon and remained on the charts for a total of 20 weeks. "ER" was the group's 8th consecutive number one hit and also managed to become the group's second highest grossing single to date, putting "Kanfu Fighting", in third place after four years.

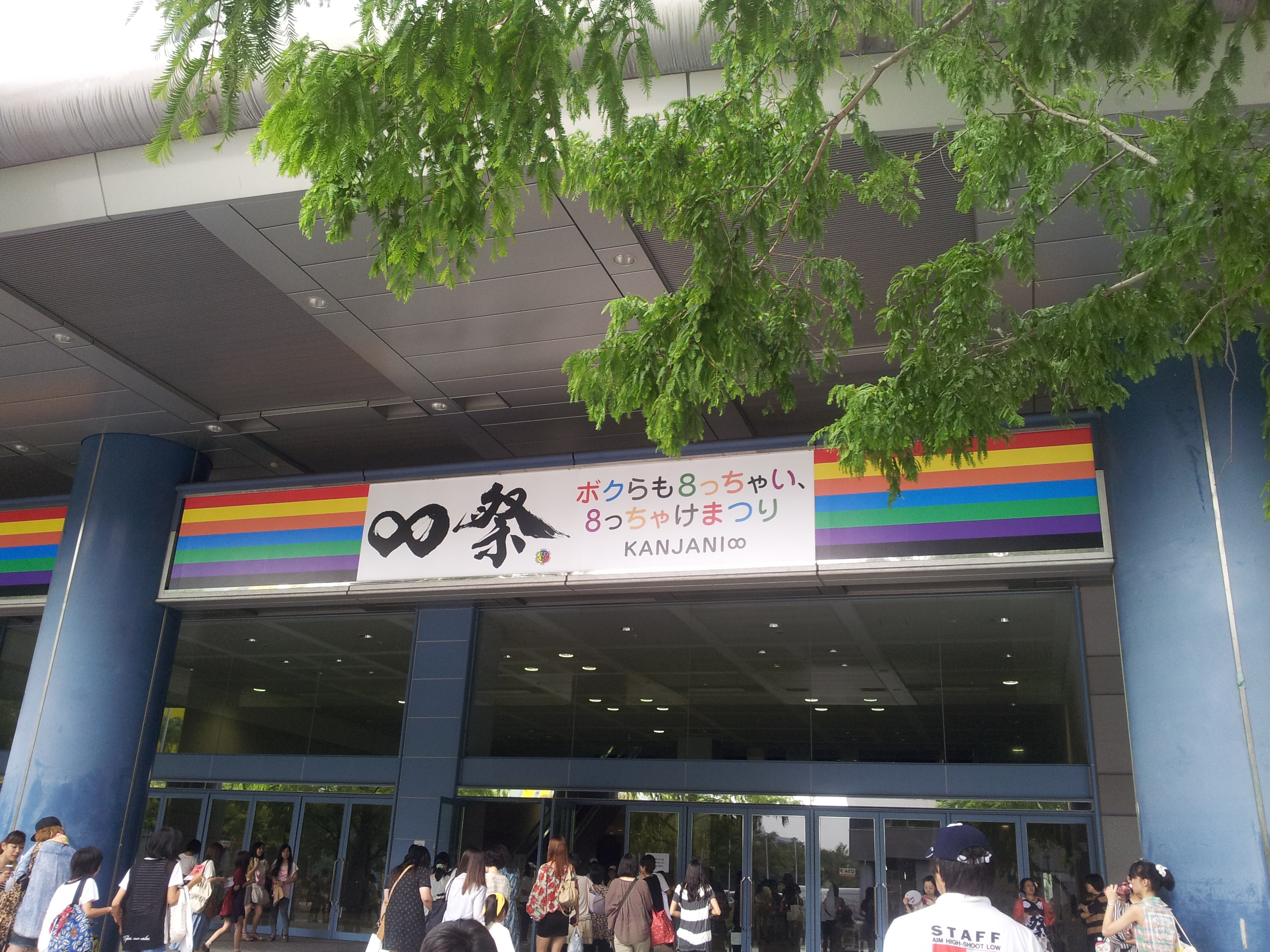
The entrance to the Hasai Bokura mo Hacchai, Hacchake Matsuri at Intex Osaka on August 11, 2012

In June, a fan appreciation event was announced. On August 8, 2012, Kanjani Eight performed "Matsubara Shinichi Presents: Sugohachi" at Kyocera Dome Osaka, a free live to winners of a lottery raffle. The raffle tickets were included in the releases for "Ai Deshita" and "ER". Roughly 40,000 winning tickets were available in that raffle. Also, during that same month, Kanjani Eight produced and performed at Hasai Bokura mo Hacchai, Hacchake Matsuri (8sai), pay-for fan appreciation event that took place in Tokyo on the weekend of August 5 and in Osaka on the weekend of August 10 respectively. The "Sugohachi" performance involved Kanjani Eight playing a game where they moved around a game board, performing tasks related to the group's history. At the end of the event, they had a countdown of the top 5 best songs selected by fans in a survey taken at the Tokyo 8sai event.

The Hasai Bokura mo Hacchai, Hacchake Matsuri was a festival with various activities for fans to take part of spanning an entire day. A website was launched with information shortly after the announcement. Tickets were sold, initially as a lottery, to the general public online or through phone via Ticket PiA. After the results were released, a general sale happened as a first-come, first-served. Attendees were allowed to select the day and group that they wanted to go in. Open to the general population, the event split up attendees into five different groups, each assigned a different talk and live time. The talks involved Kanjani Eight taking part in games in order to win center position on their next release while the lives had the group perform a mini concert, one half being dance tracks and the other half being acoustic. The title, Hasai Bokura mo Hacchai, Hacchake Matsuri (∞祭 ボクらも8っちゃい、8っちゃけ祭) is a pun that does not directly translate into English. Hasai can be read as Eight Festival or taken as a double meaning for Eight Years. Hacchai/Hacchake is more of an expression to explain someone who's really over the top or has really gone beyond the norm.

On August 6, Kanjani Eight's third anniversary single, "Aoppana", was announced. "Aoppana" was the theme song to the drama, Boys on the Run, which starred member Maruyama Ryuhei in the lead. The single was released on September 9, 2012, and had two editions—a regular and limited edition. The first press of the regular edition of the song contained a photo album that featured the childhood photos of each member while the limited edition single contained the DVD of the promotional video as well as the behind the scenes. The cover art was also different, with the regular edition featuring Kanjani Eight as children and the limited edition featuring the group as their adult selves doing the same poses. The single shot to number one upon release with a total of 280,000 units sold. It stayed on the charts for 21 weeks and is the group's tenth highest grossing single to date.

In early September, Kanjani Eight's first compilation album was announced. Titled, 8EST: Eight x Eighter = Eightest!, three versions of the album was released. Two limited editions along with a normal edition. Limited edition A contained the live performances from 8sai as well as a documentary about the production of the festival. It also contained a digest of "Matsubara Shinichi Presents: Sugohachi". Limited edition B contained all five days of the 8sai live talk segments, the "Hohoemi Date", a punishment game that the two worst performing members in the 8sai games had to do, and a postcard set featuring the promotional artwork of all their singles up to Crouton, the only original song from 8EST. The album contained all of the group's A-side releases up to "ER", except for the normal edition which contained all the songs from GIFT. 8EST reached number one on the Oricon charts with 298,000 units sold, the first compilation album of theirs to do so. It was also their 5th consecutive single since their second album, KJ2 Zukkoke Dai Dassou, to reach number one.

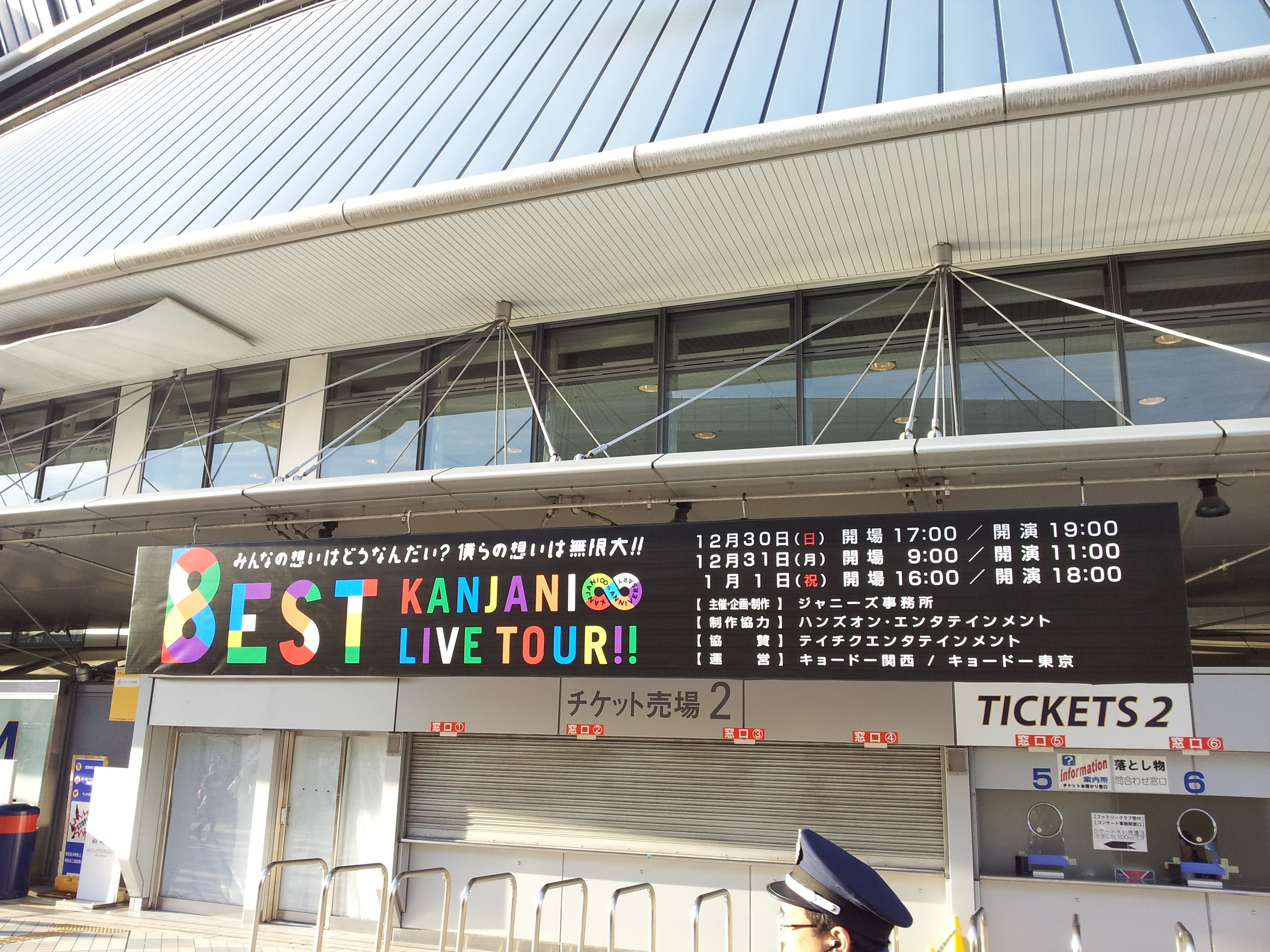
The sign board for the Osaka dome extension at Kyocera Dome Osaka on December 31, 2012

During the 8sai festival, on August 5, Kanjani Eight announced their concert tour the year. Titled, Kanjani Eight Live Tour 8EST: Minna no omoi wa doudai? Bokura no omoi wa mugendai!, it was scheduled for ten cities with a total of 35 performances. The tour kicked off with the group's first stadium performance at Ajinomoto Stadium in Tokyo on September 15, 2012. During those performances, it was then announced that the tour would be extended to include two dome performances at Tokyo and Osaka. This brought the total attendance, scheduled, of the tour to a grand total of 880,000 attendees. The tour continued on to Osaka for the Nagai Stadium performances but was ultimately canceled on the last day, September 30, due to Typhoon no. 17. In response to the cancellation, Kanjani Eight released a statement,

For everyone looking forward to our final stadium performance in our hometown of Osaka, we are extremely sorry but thinking of the safety of you all that were going to come, we canceled tomorrow's live at Nagai Sports Stadium. This is our first outdoor live in Osaka and we, all us members, were really looking forward to it. Though we're filled with a lot of regret, today we're going to perform on stage with all our might. We will try to do our best as our 8th anniversary tour continues.

— Kanjani Eight, Johnny's Net Statement

The concert tour continued on with the arena and dome performances. In support of their compilation album, the group only performed their most popular songs and unit/solos. The arena performances had a different setlist than the dome performances, with the arena being a condensed version of the stadium performances (containing shorter songs and a new Eight Rangers skit) while the dome performances axed the skit for longer songs and solos. Tickets for the concert were sold through the fanclub while the Tokyo and Osaka dome extensions were opened up to the general public through playguide and sold via Lawson Ticket. Also, different this year was the absence of a countdown live. This was because Kanjani Eight was to perform for the first time at the NHK Kouhaku Uta Gassen.

The Japanese version of Spider-Man: Homecoming has an exclusive theme song titled "Never Say Never" by the band.

The group was the 5th artist by total sales revenue in Japan in 2012 and 2013, with ¥4.916 billion and ¥4.738 billion, respectively.

=== 2014: Launching of the independent record label Infinity Records ===
Right after their 10th anniversary celebrations (十祭, Jussai), Kanjani Eight announced launching of the independent record label Infinity Records that was named by members. Their contract with record company Teichiku Entertainment expired on the 24th and they have since launched their own independent label, to be under the umbrella of J-storm. With the independent label, there will be an increased responsibility as members seek to pursue Kanjani Eight-ness. They will be responsible for production, from song arrangement and recording, release time, and concert planning. According to Murakami Shingo, this has been decided so that "we can show our colors and ideas more deeply" and promises growth as a group. Additionally, launching of the independent record label is first time as a boy group of Johnny & Associations.

The group was the third artist by total sales revenue in Japan in 2014, with ¥5.862 billion.

=== 2018: Gr8est ===
On April 14, Kanjani Eight announced that their main vocalist, Subaru Shibutani, would be departing the group to pursue his own goals of studying music abroad. His activities with the group were limited until the end of his contract, which expired on December 31, 2018, and he was not performing with the members for the remainder of the year. In September 2019, Nishikido announced that he was also leaving both the group and agency at the end of the month.

=== 2021: 8beat ===
On November 17, Kanjani Eight introduced 10th original album 8beat, which is released for the first time in 4 and half years. The group accordingly announced the live tour "Kanijani's Relive 8beat" from November 20 to January 23. It was the first concert with spectators since the performance in Tokushima on February 14, 2020, of previous concert tour "UPDATE" that was canceled due to the covid-19 pandemic.

=== 2024: Renaming as Super Eight ===
As with all things "Johnny"-name related, after the Johnny Kitagawa sexual abuse scandal erupted in 2023, the group's name was changed. The new name, "Super Eight", was announced on February 4, 2024.

== Members ==
- You Yokoyama (横山 裕, Yokoyama Yū; born Yokoyama Kimitaka (横山 侯隆), May 9, 1981) – percussionist, trumpet, guitar, and supporting vocals
- Shingo Murakami (村上 信五, Murakami Shingo; born January 26, 1982) – keyboardist, supporting vocals, rapper
- Ryuhei Maruyama (丸山 隆平, Maruyama Ryūhei; born November 26, 1983) – bassist, harmony vocals
- Shota Yasuda (安田 章大, Yasuda Shōta; born September 11, 1984) – lead guitarist, lead vocals,
- Tadayoshi Okura (大倉 忠義, Ōkura Tadayoshi; born May 16, 1985) – drummer, lead vocalist

Former member

- Hiroki Uchi (内 博貴, Uchi Hiroki; born September 10, 1986) – vocals
- Subaru Shibutani (渋谷 すばる, Shibutani Subaru; born September 22, 1981) – lead vocalist and rhythm guitarist
- Ryo Nishikido (錦戸 亮, Nishikido Ryō; born November 3, 1984) – second guitarist, lead vocalist

=== Sub-units ===
Within Kanjani Eight are several subunits created by the members for various reasons, either for a creative outlet or for other special reasons such as concerts. Out of all the units created between them, only SanKyōDai and SubaruBand have made it onto actual albums.

SubaruBand – A rock band that is composed of Shibutani (vo), Maruyama (ba), Yasuda (g), and Ohkura (dr). The group made its first appearance in 2002 at the Kanjani Eight Xmas Party. The songs are composed by Yasuda, lyrics written by Shibutani, and arranged by the band. Notable songs are "One", "High Position", and "Down up ↑"

SanKyōDai – An acoustic band as well as a full sounding band with Maruyama and Ohkura on support. Its main members are Yuu (Yokoyama), Chipa (Yasuda), and Baru (Shibutani) and their first appearance was at the 2003 Kanjani8 Xmas Party. Up until the Christmas 2005 show, SanKyoudai had released new song, these songs being, "Purin" (Pudding), "Amechan" (Candy), "Mikan" (Oranges), and "Onigishi" (Onigiri). Lyrics are written by Yuu and songs composed by Chipa.

YamaDa – A manzai duo created by Maruyama and Yasuda in which Maruyama plays the boke and Yasuda plays the tsukkomi.

There are also other lesser known subunits that the group has created such as OhYamaDa (band), SanBaka (Shibutani, Yokoyama, Murakami), Yasuba (Yasuda and Shibutani), and others.

== Canjani Eight ==
Canjani Eight (キャンジャニ∞(エイト), Kyanjani Eito; stylized as Canjani∞) is Kanjani Eight's "counterpart sub-unit" which consists of the members crossdressing and singing like a female idol group. They were "formed" in May 2015 and made their first appeared through Candy Crush Soda Saga commercial which features the unit's first song "Candy My Love." It was included in Kanjani Eight's 33rd single "Maemuki Scream!" which was released on August 5, 2015. The group also makes their appearance in Kanjani Eight's live concerts afterwards. In 2022, for the first time 7 years, the group is announced to release a new song titled "Nai wa~ Falling Love (ないわぁ〜フォーリンラブ). It was first performed at TV Tokyo's "Premier MelodiX!" on December 19, 2022. The song is written by Yasushi Akimoto, the producer for the AKB48 Group, Sakamichi Series and many other female groups. Dance performer Takahiro, who also has worked on Sakamichi series choreography, also did the song's choreography. The song and its music video is included in Kanjani Eight's 48th single "Mikansei." On April 1, 2024, it changed name to "Candy Eight".

== Discography ==
Studio albums

- KJ1 F.T.O (2006)
- KJ2 Zukkoke Dai Dassō (2007)
- Puzzle (2009)
- 8 Uppers (2010)
- Fight (2011)
- Juke Box (2013)
- Kanjanism (2014)
- Kanjani8 no Genki ga deru CD (2015)
- Jam (2017)
- 8beat (2021)
- Super Eight (2024)

== Concerts/stage ==
=== Concert tours ===
- 2002–2005 X-mas Party
- 2005 Zenyasai 1st Live
- 2006 F.T.O.N. (Funky Tokyo Osaka Nagoya)
- 2006 1st Nationwide tour
- 2007 Kanjani8 Dome Concert in Osaka: Eh? Honma?! Bikkuri!
- 2007 Kanjani8 Nationwide 47 Prefecture Tour: Eh? Honma?! Bikkuri! Tour 2007
- 2008 Kanjani8 Live Tour 2008! 8 Da Yo! Zenin Shugo!
- 2008 Kanjani8 Live Tour 2008: Natsu Da! Tsūa Da! Wahaha!
- 2009 Kanjani8 Tour 2009 Puzzle
- 2009 Kanjani8 Dome Concert 2009–2010
- 2010 Kanjani8 ∞Uppers Live Concert 2010–2011
- 2011 Kanjani8: 5 Big Dome Tour Eight x Eighter: Sorry if it isn't Enjoyable Tour 2011 - 2012
- 2012 Kanjani8 Live Tour!! 8EST: Minna no omoi wa dounandai? Bokura no omoi wa Mugendai!!
- 2013 Kanjani8 Jukebox tour 2013-2014
- 2014 Jussai
- 2014 Kanjani8 Kanjanism Live Tour 2014-2015
- 2015 Kanjani8 Recital We Will Capture Your Heart!
- 2015 Kanjani8 No Genki ga deru LIVE 2015-2016
- 2016 Kanjani8 recital Manatsu no orera ha tsumi na yatsu
- 2016 kanjani's Entertainment
- 2017 kanjani's Entertainment JAM
- 2018 kanjani's Entertainment GR8EST
- 2018 kanjani's Entertainment GR8EST in Taipei
- 2019 Jyugosai
- 2020 UPDATE

=== Stage performances ===
- 2002 Another
- 2003 Dōton Boys
- 2004 Summer Storm
- 2004 Magical Musical Dream Boy
- 2005 Hey! Say! Dream Boy
- 2005 Magical Summer
- 2006 Another's Another
- 2006 Dream Boys

=== Concerts ===
- 2020 Johnny's DREAM IsLAND 2020→2025

== Filmography ==
=== Variety programming ===
- 2002–2003 J3 Kansai
- 2004–2005 Urajani
- 2005 Mugendai no Gimon
- 2005–2007 Suka J
- 2003–2007 Honjani
- 2007 Oishinsuke
- 2007–2008 Mucha Buri
- 2008–2009 Can!Jani
- 2009 Kanpani
- 2010–2012 Bōken Japan! Kanjani8 Map
- 2011–2015 Kanjani8 no Shiwake∞
- 2017–2018 Pekojani∞

=== Current programming ===
- 2007–present Kanjani8 no Janiben
- 2008–present Ariehen Sekai
- 2015–present "Kanjani8 Chronicles"
- 2015–present "Kanjam"
- 2022-February 2024 Kanjani8 no Gojiyuni → February 2024-March 2024 changed name in reciprocity to the change of the group's name, becoming Super Eight no Gojiyuni. On March 4, 2024, it was announced that the show would end due to the network's spring schedule reorganization.

=== Television dramas ===
- 2005 Yakusoku
- 2006 Dive to the Future
- 2006 Double
- 2006 Kemarishi
- 2006 Jitensha Shonenki
- 2011 Ikiteru Dake de Nankurunaisa
- 2012 Papa wa Idol!

=== Movies ===
- 2010 8Uppers
- 2012 Eight Ranger
- 2014 Eight Ranger 2

== Publications ==
=== Photobook ===
- 2007 Kanjani Eight "E! Honma!? Bikkuri!! TOUR 2007 Close-up Document Photobook
- 2012 for no.∞

=== Manga ===
- Honma ni Kanjani Eight!! (ほんまに関ジャニ∞!!, Honma ni Kanjani 8!!)
- Ooki ni Kanjani Eight!! (おおきに関ジャニ∞!!, Ooki ni Kanjani 8!!) (a continuation of Honma ni Kanjani Eight!!)
