= Gift (Kanjani Eight EP) =

GIFT
- GIFT ~White~

EP by Kanjani8
- Released: December 23, 2009 (White); December 24, 2009 (Red); December 25, 2009 (Green)
- Genre: Pop
- Length: 8:48 (White); 10:03 (Red); 13:58 (Green)
- Label: Imperial Records

Alternative cover
- Gift ~Red~

Alternative cover
- Gift ~Green~

"GIFT" is a triple-single released by the Japanese boyband Kanjani Eight—stylized Kanjani∞. The three singles are the band's 11th, 12th, and 13th singles. The songs were released during the Christmas period. Each single release, except "Green", contains two songs; Green has three songs. Each single has cover art reflecting the color theme of each single. GIFT was advertised as a gift from the group members to their fans. The three singles were sold at a special price of ¥888 and were a limited-press release.

The "GIFT" singles have seven Christmas-themed songs; some were written or composed by members of the group. Shota Yasuda designed the label for the single; Kanjani8 collectively photographed the backstage activities and provided creative ideas for the jacket design. Like the previous singles since "It's My Soul", member Tadayoshi Okura dresses as Santa Claus as the singles' joke for this release. He appears in the outfit on "Gift ~Green~", completing the group picture that spans the backs of all three singles.

On December 29, 2009, it was announced that Kanjani8 had broken an Oricon record by having three singles released on three consecutive days, and monopolized the top ten weekly rankings by reaching the top three. This was the first time an album or single release had done this. When they were asked about it, member You Yokoyama said, "Being the first to have a three day consecutive release and be the first to have it in the top 1, 2, 3 spots make me really happy".

== Track listing ==
=== White ===
1. "Fuyu Koi" (冬恋, "Winter Love)
2. "Kimi no uta wo utau" (君の歌をうたう, "I'll sing your song)

=== Red ===
1. "I wish"
2. "Minus 100 do no Koi" (マイナス100度の恋, Minus 100 Degrees Love)

=== Green ===
1. "Yuki wo kudasai" (雪をください, Please give me snow)
2. "One day in winter"
3. "Snow White"

== Charts ==
Single	Day/Week	Oricon Chart	Peak Position	Sales Total
White	Day 1	Oricon Daily Ranking	1	23,977
White	Week 1	Oricon Weekly Ranking	1	134,811
White	Month	Oricon Monthly Ranking	2	
White	Year	Oricon Monthly Ranking	44	136,003
Red	Day 1	Oricon Daily Ranking	1	26,686
Red	Week 1	Oricon Weekly Ranking	2	132,887
Red	Month	Oricon Monthly Ranking	3	
Red	Year	Oricon Monthly Ranking	46	133,978
Green	Day 1	Oricon Daily Ranking	1	55,714
Green	Week 1	Oricon Weekly Ranking	3	135,210
Green	Month	Oricon Monthly Ranking	4	
Green	Year	Oricon Monthly Ranking	43	136,508
