= Inu o Kau to Iu Koto =

- Also known as: My Dog, My Happiness
- Country of origin: Japan
- Original language: Japanese
- No. of seasons: 1

Production
- Running time: 54 minutes

Original release
- Network: TV Asahi
- Release: 15 April 2011

Inu o Kau to Iu Koto (犬を飼うということ, My Dog, My Happiness) is a Japanese television series which premiered on TV Asahi on April 15, 2011. Its full title is Inu o kau toyuu koto〜 sukai to wagaya no 180-nichi〜 (犬を飼うということ〜スカイと我が家の180日〜, The Story of Keeping a Dog〜180 Days that the Dog Named "Sky" Stayed in our Home).

== Cast ==
- Ryo Nishikido as Yuji Hongo
- Asami Mizukawa as Sachiko Hongo
- Kokoro Kuge as Mako Hongo
- Ryutaro Yamasaki as Masaru Hongo
- Tetsu Watanabe as Resident Association leader
- Takao Toji as the apartment complex building manager
- Mai Tachihara
- Kojiro Kawai
- Mayu Harada
- Junnosuke Taguchi as Katsuhiko Hotta
- Kohei Takeda as Hideki Kawashima
- Yuki Shikanuma as Yukiko Azumi
- Shingo Kazami as Keisuke Nakao
- Fukikoshi Mitsuru as Seigo Nozaki
- Tetta Sugimoto as Soichi Narahashi
- Shigeru Izumiya as Matsuo Kubota
- Akemi Omori as Hatsue Kubota
- Eriko Moriwaki as Yoshiko Hatakeyama
- Ryoka Ihara as Shizuka Hatakeyama
- Yoko Oshima as Sachiko's co-worker
- Masahiro Kohama as the manager of the supermarket

== Episodes ==
| | Episode title | Romanized title | Translation of title | Broadcast date | Ratings |
|---|---|---|---|---|---|
| Ep. 1 | 貧乏家族、小さな命を拾う!? | Binbō kazoku, chiisana inochi o hirou!? | A poor family picking up a small life!? | April 15, 2011 | 9.3% |
| Ep. 2 | 一緒に、生きよう | Issho ni, ikiyou | Living together | April 22, 2011 | 8.3% |
| Ep. 3 | 大切な家族の失踪 | Taisetsuna kazoku no shissō | The disappearance of an important family member | April 29, 2011 | 7.8% |
| Ep. 4 | 泣いてたまるか!! | Naite tamaru ka!! | Crying! | May 6, 2011 | 8.6% |
| Ep. 5 | 初めてのさよなら | Hajimete no sayonara | First Goodbye | May 13, 2011 | 9.4% |
| Ep. 6 | スカイを助けて! | Sukai o tasukete! | Sky needs help! | May 20, 2011 | 7.4% |
| Ep. 7 | 君がくれた奇跡 | Kimi ga kureta kiseki | You gave me a miracle | May 27, 2011 | 8.1% |
| Ep. 8 | 最終章〜君の命 | Saishū Akira〜-kun no inochi | The Final Chapter of Your Life | June 3, 2011 | 8.3% |
| Ep. 9 | 拾われたのは僕たち家族のほうでした | Hirowa reta no wa boku-tachi kazoku no hōdeshitai | I was picked up by your family | June 10, 2011 | 9.0% |
Ratings for Kanto region (average rating 8.47%)

| Preceded by Bartender (4/2/2011 - 2/4/2011) | Asahi TV Friday Night Drama 金曜ナイトドラマ; Fridays 23:15 - 00:10 (JST) | Succeeded by Jiu (29/7/2011 - 23/9/2011) |
