= Crayon Shin-chan: Fierceness That Invites Storm! Operation Golden Spy =

Crayon Shin-chan The Movie: Fierceness That Invites Storm! Operation Golden Spy
- Film poster
- Directed by: Soichi Masui
- Written by: Yoshito Usui (original manga)
- Starring: Akiko Yajima; Miki Narahashi; Keiji Fujiwara; Satomi Kōrogi; Rikako Aikawa; Tomo Sakurai; Kenyu Horiuchi; Shingo Murakami; Tadayoshi Okura; Manas Singh
- Production company: Shin-Ei Animation
- Distributed by: Toho
- Release date: April 16, 2011
- Running time: 107 minutes
- Country: Japan
- Language: Japanese
- Box office: $14,295,582

Crayon Shin-chan: Fierceness That Invites Storm! Operation Golden Spy (クレヨンしんちゃん 嵐を呼ぶ黄金のスパイ大作戦, Kureyon Shinchan Arashi o Yobu Ōgon no Supai Daisakusen), also known as Shin Chan, The Spy, is a 2011 anime film. It is the 19th film based on the popular comedy manga and anime series Crayon Shin-chan. The following was produced by Shin-Ei Animation, the studio behind the TV anime. The film was released in theatres on April 16, 2011, in Japan.

== Plot ==
A young girl attempts to infiltrate the World Human Research Center in search of something called "Megahegaderu 2", discovering that a "Spare Key" is required to retrieve Megahegaderu 2.

While playing, Shin-chan is met by a young girl named Lemon Sunomono (the girl from before) who reveals herself to be a spy. She explains to Shin-chan that Action Mask (Shin-chan's idol) is recruiting children as spies and that he and her have been chosen to carry out an important mission for Action Mask that involves retrieving an important capsule from an evil doctor. Lemon then begins training Shin-chan, during these sessions she is contacted by her mother Lime through a device where they refer Shin-chan to as "Spare Key".

During Shin-chan's training, his friends: Kazama, Nene, Masao and Bo believe that Lemon is a recruiter for a TV Show which Shin-chan has been cast in. They are suddenly attacked by the evil doctor's men and with Shin-chan's friends' help (due to their belief), Lemon is able to tackle the men back. As Lemon's escort (a 20-year old woman) drives the two to Shin-chan's house. En route, Lemon tells Shin-chan that he can get to meet Action Mask if he succeeds in his mission. During dinner, Lemon explains to Shin-chan's parents (Hiroshi & Misae) that her parents are government officials and have a strict nature. All of that is true, except for the fact that her parents are actually spies that work for a secret organization. Through her communication device, Lemon sends the signal to her mother as a sleep-inducing gas is released in the house (by the members of the secret organization Lime works for) and the entire Nohara family falls asleep due to it.

Shin-chan awakens in a huge balloon aeroplane where Lemon displays a short video to Shin-chan. In it, Action Mask explains Shin-chan that the evil doctor's organization is celebrating its anniversary and that tonight would be the perfect opportunity to retrieve the capsule. He also promises Shin-chan a party if he succeeds in his mission. Lemon and Shin-chan wear a disguise and infiltrate the facility. After several roadblocks, Lemon tells Shin-chan that his and the doctor's body is extremely similar, and that only he can enter the doctor's laboratory since the doctor set his body as a key to enter.

Shin-chan passes through a hallway filled with lasers, he then finally arrives at the doctor's lab and is ultimately greeted by the "evil" doctor who introduces himself as Dr. Hegaderu. He explains to Shin-chan that he once intended to create a food item that would decrease the amount of gas released by humans (in order to prevent global warming). He wanted to name that food item "Megahegaderu" but accidentally created a food item that greatly increases the amount of gas released by humans and named it "Megahegaderu 2". Since then, he had been debating on whether to keep it for research purposes or destroy it. This was the "capsule" Shin-chan was told to retrieve and the doctor further explains that all that has been told to him is a lie. Despite this explanation, Shin-chan steals Megahegaderu 2, insisting on not believing in the doctor's words.

Shin-chan meets up with Lemon as the two escape. In the truck, Lemon tells Shin-chan that he can finally meet Action Mask. The next morning, Lemon, Shin-chan, Lime and Plum (Lemon's parents) head towards the secret organization (Herebu located in Herebu kingdom) Lime and Plum work for. The organization is led by twin sisters Narao and Yosuru who are delighted at the sight of Megahegaderu 2. Shin-chan is then introduced to the Action Mask he talked to in the video which turns out to be a fake version. Narao and Yosuru reveal that Action Mask's involvement was just to trick Shin-chan into stealing the Megahegaderu 2. Everything that Dr. Hegaderu said was true. The only reason they needed him was due to his unique physical resembelence to Dr. Hegaderu, making him a "Spare Key" to enter Dr. Hegaderu's laboratory. Shin-chan is then taken away along with the rest of his family into a special chamber where they are fed the Megahegaderu 2. It causes them to release a huge amount of gas that gets stored in large tanks.

Narao and Yosuru reveal their intention of filling the entire world with stench, since they were once ostracized for releasing gas. While the two twins along with Lime and Plum are celebrating, Lemon becomes devastated and guilt-ridden for betraying Shin-chan like that. So that night, she steals the Megahegaderu 2 and frees the Nohara family and tells them to run away. Shin-chan however leaves and goes to protect Lemon from her parents' rage while his family operate the vehicle they are sitting in to rescue Shin-chan.

Shin-chan and Lemon change the settings of the missiles filled with gas so that they will land in the ocean instead of in the countries, and with the Megahegaderu 2 evade Herebu forces for as long as they can. Along the way, they eventually decide to eat the Megahegaderu 2 to stop Narao and Yosuru's plan and stuff the rest into Narao and Yosuru's mouths as Shin-chan's parents intervene the scene (in the operating vehicle) allowing Shin-chan and Lemon to escape. Shortly after, the Megahegaderu 2 causes Shin-chan and Lemon's stomachs to swell up to a gigantic size before letting out a gigantic wave of gas that destroys the facility. Narao and Yosuru, while accepting their having now lost everything and looking at the positives, meet a similar fate that they embrace together.

Misae & Hiroshi rescue Shin-chan and Lime & Plum rescue Lemon. While Misae & Hiroshi are overjoyed with Shin-chan's safety, Lime & Plum apologize to Lemon, promising to prioritize her needs above all else's. Shin-chan and Lemon bid farewell as Shin-chan and his family return to Kasukabe, with Lemon and her family planning to start a new life outside Herebu.

== Casts and characters ==
- Akiko Yajima - Shinnosuke Nohara
- Miki Narahashi - Misae Nohara
- Keiji Fujiwara - Hiroshi Nohara
- Satomi Korogi - Himawari Nohara
- Rikako Aikawa - Lemon
- Tomo Sakurai - Lime
- Kenyu Horiuchi - Plum
- Shingo Murakami - Jagger
- Tadayoshi Okura - Mash
- Kikuko Inoue - Narlao
- Lemon Sunomono - A 7-year old spy girl who suddenly appeared in front of Shinnosuke. Her mission was to recapture the "Action Power Capsule" from Dr. Hegaderu "scientist of evil" along with the Shinnosuke as a member of the "Action Spy" Organization, which was supposedly run by Action Mask. Her true identity is a spy of the Republic of Sukashipesutan who received a directive that was to retrieve "Megahegaderu 2", a powerful experimental sweet potato jelly developed by Dr. Hegaderu of the Hegaderu Kingdom. She is powerful in both physical ability and knowledge, but is always calm and reassuring due to her parents ingraining the idea of absolute obedience on her. After realizing the true plan of Narao and Yosuru, she releases the Nohara family and along with Shinnosuke, planned on stopping their plans. In order to do so, they both ate most of Megahegaderu II" and destroyed the laboratory itself by releasing a huge fart. After the big incident, she and her family live in exile in the Hegderu kingdom.
- Lime Sunomono - The mother of Lemon who is also a spy and the secondary antagonist of the film. At first she was strict to her daughter due to their status as spies but towards the end of the movie, after witnessing her daughter risk her life, she vowed to become a better mother.
- Plum Sunomono - The father of Lemon who is also a spy and a major antagonist of the film. He is usually seen as calm and reassuring but takes his job as a spy seriously. He also cares dearly about his daughter and towards the end of the movie, vows to become a better father.
- Narao and Yosuru - The two queens of the Republic of Sukashipestuan and the main antagonists of the film. Their true goal is to make the world suffer by the smell of farts due to them being embarrassed by it at an early age. Towards the end of the movie, they were force fed parts of the Megahegaderu II by Lemon and Shinnosuke which eventually caused them to bloat and fly away by farting. Their ending status is unknown.

== International release ==
This film was dubbed in Hindi and released in India on Hungama TV as Shin Chan Movie The Spy on 8 June 2013.

== See also ==
- Crayon Shin-chan
- Yoshito Usui
