= Ryo Nishikido =

Japanese singer and actor (born 1984)

Ryo Nishikido 錦戸 亮
- Born: November 3, 1984 (age 41); Kadoma, Osaka, Japan
- Genres: J-pop; Rock
- Occupations: Singer; actor
- Years active: 1997–present
- Labels: Nomad Records; Johnny's Entertainment; Teichiku Records; Imperial Records; Infinity Records
- Formerly of: News; Kanjani Eight
- Website: https://www.ryonishikido.com/

Ryo Nishikido (錦戸 亮, Nishikido Ryō; born November 3, 1984) is a Japanese singer and actor. He was formerly under the management of Johnny & Associates as a member of Japanese boy bands Kanjani Eight and News. His first solo album was released in December 2019.

== Biography ==
Ryo Nishikido was born in Hyogo on November 3, 1984, and raised in Osaka. He was selected as a member of the Johnny's Jr. collective in 1997, and subsequently made his major debut in 2004 as an actor and a singer with pop band News. He was also the co-lead vocalist and second guitarist for Kanjani Eight, a Johnny & Associates boy band made up of Johnny's Jr. members originating from the Kansai region in Japan. He held his first solo concert in 2006. He also started playing major supporting roles on prime-time television dramas such as 1 Litre of Tears, Attention Please and Last Friends. He won several acting awards for his portrayal of an abusive boyfriend in Last Friends.

Nishikido made his big-screen debut in summer 2010, playing the lead role in A Boy and His Samurai. In the film, he played a time-travelling samurai who arrived in modern Japan and became a patissier. He also starred in the detective drama Joker: Yurusarezaru Sōsakan and romantic comedy Full Throttle Girl in 2011.

From 2004 to 2011, Nishikido was active in both News and Kanjani Eight, releasing 9 studio albums and going on nationwide tours with both groups, which was unusual for an idol. On October 7, 2011, Johnny & Associates announced that Nishikido would be leaving News due to scheduling conflicts making it difficult for him to continue as an active member of both News and Kanjani Eight.

Between 2012 and 2014, Nishikido took on leading roles in comedy-dramas such as the semi-autobiographical Papadol!, The Fortune Telling Shop, Onmyoya and Gomen ne Seishun. He also starred in films Hospitality Department and I Just Wanna Hug You. As part of Kanjani Eight, he also co-hosts variety programmes such as Kanjani8 no Janiben on Kansai TV and appeared on the Kōhaku thrice. He was also in the action comedy films Eight Ranger and Eight Ranger 2 with his group.

Nishikido starred in Daihachi Yoshida’s black comedy The Scythian Lamb in 2018.

In March 2019, news of his decision to leave Johnny & Associates emerged from the weekly magazine Shūkan Bunshun. Nishikido subsequently announced in September 2019 that he was leaving Johnny & Associates and Kanjani Eight at the end of the month.

== Personal life ==
Nishikido's family includes his parents, two elder brothers, and a younger sister. His father is from Amakusa, Kumamoto and his mother is from Amami, Kagoshima, both in the Kyushu region of Japan.

== Discography ==
=== Albums ===
- Nomad (December 11, 2019)
- Note (January 27, 2021)
- Nocturnal (November 30, 2022)

== Filmography ==
=== Television dramas ===
| Year | Drama | Role | Notes | Ref. |
|---|---|---|---|---|
| 1998 | Binbō Dōshin Goyōchō | | | |
| 1999 | Nekketsu renai dō | Tadao | Lead role; episode 13 | |
| 1999 | Shichinin no Samurai J ke no Hanran | Ryo Jonouchi | | |
| 1999 | Kowai Nichiyobi ~Shinsho~ | | Lead role; episode 4 | |
| 2000 | Peace Wave ~Ukurere to shōnen~ | Jun Hisata | Lead role | |
| 2000 | Shijou Saiaku no Date | Kengo | Lead role; episode 8; short drama | |
| 2001 | Zenigetchū!! | Kounosuke Matsugami | Lead role | |
| 2003 | Card Queen | Tomoya Kurata | | |
| 2004 | Teruteru Kazoku | Kazuto Kuwahara | Asadora | |
| 2005 | Ganbatte Ikimasshoi | Hiroyuki Sekino | | |
| 2005 | One Liter of Tears | Haruto Asou | | |
| 2006 | Attention Please | Shota Nakahara | | |
| 2006 | Dive to Future | Shimoda | Single-episode drama | |
| 2006 | Kemarishi | Kuroshima | Single-episode drama | |
| 2008 | Isshun no Kaze ni Nare | Kenichi Kamiya | Miniseries | |
| 2008 | Last Friends | Sosuke Oikawa | | |
| 2008 | Ryūsei no Kizuna | Taisuke Ariake | | |
| 2009 | Orthros no Inu | Ryosuke Aoi | | |
| 2009 | Niini no Koto o Wasurenaide | Keisuke Kawai | Lead role; television film | |
| 2010 | Joker: Yurusarezaru Sōsakan | Kenji Kudo | | |
| 2011 | Inu o Kau to Iu Koto | Yuji Hongo | Lead role | |
| 2011 | Full Throttle Girl | Sota Yamada | | |
| 2012 | Papadol! | Himself | Lead role | |
| 2013 | The Fortune Telling Shop, Onmyoya | Shoumei Abe | Lead role | |
| 2014 | Saving My Stupid Youth | Hara Heisuke | | |
| 2015 | Samurai Sensei | Takechi Hanpeita | Lead role | |
| 2016 | Totto TV | Kyu Sakamoto | | |
| 2017 | My Loser Husband | Tsukasa Kobayashi | Lead role | |
| 2018 | Segodon | Saigō Jūdō | Taiga drama | |
| 2019 | Trace | Reiji Mano | Lead role | |
| 2023 | My Family | Kousuke Kishimoto | | |
| 2023 | Let's Get Divorced | Kyoji Kano | | |
| 2024 | Extremely Inappropriate! | Yuzuru Inujima | | |
| 2024 | Re:Revenge | Fumiya Otomo | | |
| 2025 | After the Quake | Mysterious man | Episode 4; miniseries | |
| 2026 | Extremely Inappropriate! Special | Yuzuru Inujima | Television film | |

=== Film ===
| Year | Movie | Role | Notes | Ref. |
|---|---|---|---|---|
| 2010 | A Boy and His Samurai | Kijima Yasube | Lead role | |
| 2012 | Eight Ranger | Tetsuro Nishikino | Lead role | |
| 2013 | Hospitality Department | Fumitaka Kakemizu | Lead role | |
| 2014 | I Just Wanna Hug You | Masaki Koyanagi | Lead role | |
| 2014 | Eight Ranger 2 | Tetsuro Nishikino | Lead role | |
| 2018 | The Scythian Lamb | Hajime Tsukisue | Lead role | |
| 2024 | Cottontail | Toshi | British-Japanese film | |
| 2025 | Showtime 7 | Kanji Hando | | |
| 2025 | Blue Boy Trial | Kano | | |
| 2025 | After the Quake | Mysterious man | | |
| 2027 | One Liter of Tears | Haruto Asou | Lead role | |

== Variety shows ==
| Year | Title | Ref. |
|---|---|---|
| 2002–2003 | J3 KANSAI | |
| 2003–2007 | Honjani (ほんじゃに!) | |
| 2004–2005 | Urajani (裏ジャニ) | |
| 2005 | Mugendai no Gimon (∞のギモン) | |
| 2005–2007 | Suka J (スカ☆J) | |
| 2007–2008 | Mucha Buri (むちゃ∞ブリ!) | |
| 2007 | Oishinsuke (美味紳助) | |
| 2007–2019 | Kanjani∞ no Janiben (関ジャニ∞のジャニ勉) | |
| 2008–2009 | Can!Jani (Can!ジャニ) | |
| 2009–2010 | Kanpani (関パニ) | |
| 2010–2012 | Bōken Japan! Kanjani∞ Map (冒険JAPAN! 関ジャニ∞MAP) | |
| 2011–2015 | Kanjani no Shiwake (関ジャニの仕分け∞) | |
| 2015–2019 | Kanjam kanzennen SHOW (関ジャム 完全燃SHOW) | |
| 2015–2019 | Kanjani∞ Chronicle (関ジャニ∞クロニクル) | |

== Awards ==
- 2003–2004 Nikkan Sports Drama Grand Prix: Best Newcomer for Teru Teru Kazoku
- 57th Television Drama Academy Awards: Best Supporting Actor for Last Friends
- 18th TV Life Annual Drama Awards 2008: Supporting Actor for Last Friends
- 18th TV Life Annual Drama Awards 2008: Supporting Actor for Ryusei no Kizuna
- Fall 2008 Nikkan Sports Awards: Best Supporting Actor for Last Friends
- Summer 2009 Nikkan Sports Awards: Best Supporting Actor for Orthros no Inu
