= Subaru Shibutani =

Japanese singer, actor, and lyricist (born 1981)

Subaru Shibutani 渋谷 すばる
- Born: September 22, 1981 (age 44)
- Origin: Ibaraki, Osaka, Japan
- Genres: Enka; pop; rock; blues
- Occupations: Singer; actor; lyricist
- Instruments: Vocals; guitar
- Years active: 1996–present
- Labels: Teichiku Records; Imperial Records
- Formerly of: Kanjani Eight
- Website: shibutanisubaru.com

Subaru Shibutani (渋谷 すばる, Shibutani Subaru; born September 22, 1981) is a Japanese singer, actor, and lyricist. He began his career as a member of Kansai Johnny's Jr. and later served as the main vocalist of the Japanese boy band Kanjani Eight (now known as Super Eight), which originally debuted as an enka group. He left the group in 2018. His first solo album, Nisai, was released in October 2019.

== Career ==
=== Entry into Johnny & Associates and early connections (1996–1998) ===
Shibutani joined Johnny & Associates on his birthday, September 22, 1996, after passing an audition alongside future Kanjani Eight member Ryūhei Maruyama. He was not contacted again until December, when he was invited to a second audition that took place during a KinKi Kids concert. It was there that he first met his future bandmates You Yokoyama and Shingo Murakami.

In 1998, he performed the Kansai Jr. song "Boys in the West Side", the theme for the television series Kanjani Knights. Shibutani appeared regularly on the show alongside Yokoyama and Murakami.

=== Kansai Jr. prominence and Tokyo transition (1998–2002) ===
Shibutani, Yokoyama, and Murakami frequently appeared together on Kansai Jr. programs and became close collaborators and were often grouped together in media and performances. Along with Ryo Nishikido, they were identified as prominent members of the Kansai Jr. roster.

Following a performance on Music Station, Shibutani moved to Tokyo, with Yokoyama and Murakami following him soon after. In Tokyo, Shibutani found more vocal work, and the trio became regulars on Jr.-focused television programs. They starred together in the series Ike Ike Ikemen and made frequent appearances on Koichi Domoto's variety show, Pikaichi.

In 2002, Johnny Kitagawa cast the Kansai Jrs. in Another, a stage play previously performed by SMAP and KinKi Kids.

=== Formation and debut of Kanjani Eight (2003–2004) ===
In 2003, Shibutani became a founding member of Kanjani Eight; the group's early material featured his vocals in an enka-influenced style. The group debuted in August 2004 with "Naniwa Iroha Bushi", an enka song incorporating rap elements.

The single, originally a Kansai-only release, reached No. 8 on the Oricon Singles Chart. It eventually reached No. 1 following its nationwide release.

=== Musical roles, subunits, and songwriting ===
Within Kanjani Eight, Shibutani served as the main vocalist for the sub-units SanKyoudai, an acoustic group, and SubaruBand, a rock-oriented project.

During his time as a Jr., he co-wrote several original songs with guitarist Nakaegawa Rikiya of the Jr. band FIVE, who composed the music. These songs were performed collaboratively with the band. Shibutani co-wrote several songs with Kanjani Eight member Shota Yasuda for SubaruBand, including "ONE", "High Position", and "DownUp".

=== Solo career (2018–present) ===
After leaving Kanjani Eight in 2018, Shibutani launched his solo career in 2019 with the release of his first solo album, titled Nisai (二歳).

== Discography ==
=== Singles ===
- "Kioku" / "Kokoro Odoreba" (February 11, 2015)
- "Hito" (人) (July 3, 2020)
- "July 5th" (7月5日) (September 7, 2022)
- "Booningen" (ぼーにんげん) (October 5, 2022)
- "Kore" (これ) (November 2, 2022)
- "Stir" (December 7, 2022)
- "Naisho Dansu" (ないしょダンス) (January 11, 2023)
- "Ningen Sanka" (人間讃歌) (August 21, 2024)
- "Kimirashiku ne" (君らしくね) (September 18, 2024)
- "Saraba" (さらば) (March 2, 2025)

=== Albums ===
- Uta (February 10, 2016) – cover album
- Nisai (二歳) (October 9, 2019)
- NEED (November 11, 2020)
- 2021 (September 22, 2021)
- ALPACA 5 (August 16, 2023)
- Lov U (October 16, 2024)
- Su (November 5, 2025)

=== DVDs ===
- Kioku – Shibutani Subaru / 1562 (September 16, 2015)
- Shibutani Subaru LIVE TOUR 2016 Uta (September 21, 2016)
- Nisai to 364 Hi (二歳と364日) (July 1, 2020) – documentary film
- Shibutani Subaru LIVE TOUR 2024 "Lov U" (May 28, 2025)

== Solo concerts ==
- Shibutani Subaru with Ohkura-Band (August 29, 2006 – September 17, 2006)
- Five Flat Flowers (September 4–7, 2008, in Osaka; September 23, 2008 – October 6, 2008 in Tokyo)
- Shibutani Subaru LIVE TOUR 2015 (January 18 – February 25, 2015, in Osaka, Fukuoka, Sapporo, Niigata, Sendai, Nagoya, Hiroshima, Kagawa, Tokyo)
- Shibutani Subaru LIVE TOUR 2016 (February 18 – March 27, 2016, in Nagoya, Osaka, Fukuoka, Sapporo, Tokyo)

== Filmography ==
=== Television ===
- 1999: Shichinin no Samurai J ke no Hanran
- 1999: Kowai Nichiyoobi
- 1999: Abunai Hookago
- 2001: Worst Dates in History
- 2001: Platonic Sex
- 2006: Double
- 2008: Arigatoo, Okan
- 2012: Papa wa Idol
- 2024: Like a Dragon: Yakuza, in the role of detective Makoto Date

=== Movies ===
- 2010: 8 Uppers
- 2012: Eight Ranger
- 2014: Eight Ranger 2
- 2015: La La La at Rock Bottom

== Stage ==
- 1997, 1998: Kyo to Kyo
- 1998: Mask
- 2000: Millennium Shock
- 2002: Another
- 2003: Dōton Boys
- 2004: Summer Storm
- 2004: Magical Musical Dream Boy
- 2005: Never Gonna Dance
- 2005: Hey! Say! Dream Boy
- 2005: Magical Summer
- 2005, 2006, 2009: Dream Boys
- 2006: Another's Another

== External sources ==
- Official website
