= Shingo Murakami =

Shingo Murakami 村上信五
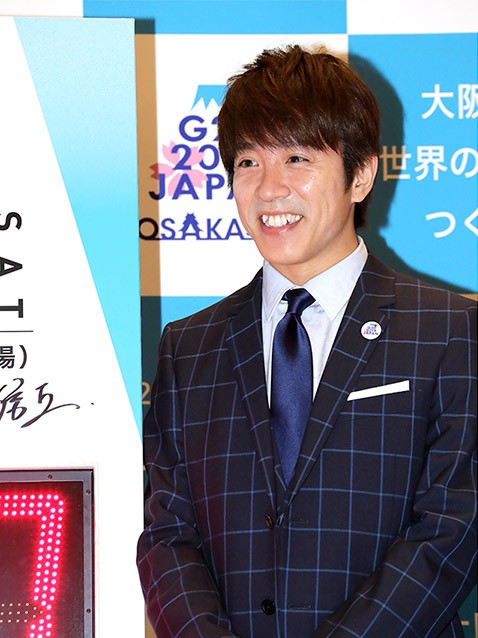

Background information
- Born: January 26, 1982 (age 44); Takatsuki, Osaka, Japan
- Genre: Pop
- Occupations: Singer; variety tarento; actor
- Instrument: Keyboards
- Years active: 1996–present
- Labels: Teichiku Records; Imperial Records

Shingo Murakami (村上 信五, Murakami Shingo; born January 26, 1982) is a Japanese singer, presenter, variety tarento,tarento and actor. He is the keyboardist of the Japanese male idol group Super Eight (previously known as Kanjani Eight).

== Early life ==
In junior high school, a classmate who was a fan of V6 recommended that he audition. He attended the audition and passed. You Yokoyama also participated in the audition, and Hideaki Takizawa was a judge.

== Career ==
Immediately after the audition, he appeared with You Yokoyama and Subaru Shibutani on KinKi Kids' Christmas Live. Afterward, they became initial members of Kansai Junior.

In 1999, "Chattery Fight Thursday Kanjani You Yokoyama-Shingo Murakami's laughing big investigation line" began on Shinnosuke Furumoto: Chaparasuka Woo! (Nippon Cultural Broadcasting).

Kanjani Eight formed in 2002 and debuted with a CD in 2004.Naniwa iroha Bushi

He performed a solo concert in Osaka Shochikuza in December 2006.

From January to February 2008, he performed in a two-person stage performanceMitei "Ichi" with Shibutani. The performance was self-produced by Shibutani and Murakami, who undertook the roles of creating, directing, and casting.

From January to February 2009, he performed in the stage show. If or ... It has been performed every year since then.

In 2010, he became a Proactiv advertising character.

In 2014, he served as a TBS caster for the "FIFA World Cup: Brazil Games" with Koji Kato.

== Filmography ==
=== TV programs ===
==== Entertainment shows ====
- 1996: Tsuyoshi Domoto no Do-Ya
- 1997: Kanjani Knight
- 1998: Nanjani!? Kanjani
- 1999: Pikaichi
- 2001: Japan Walker
- 2001: Uso!? Japan
- 2003: Momoko no Oh! Sore! Miyo!
- 2007: Megami no Antenna
- 2008: Ariehen Sekai
- 2011: Hirunandesu!
- 2012: Okasama 100!!: Geinōjin Tsuma mo Sansen! Gōka Mrs-tachi ni Manabu Shiawaseno Hint
- 2012: Monday Lateshow
- 2012: Quiz: Tokihakanenari
- 2012: Kanjani Eight no Ashita wa dotchida!
- 2013: Ōen Document: Ashita wa dotchida
- 2013: Murakami Mayonaise no Tsukko Masete Itadakimasu!
- 2015: Shingo Murakami to Sports no Kamisama-tachi
- 2025: Sakurai Shingo no onisuke tabi - MC (with Arashi's Sho Sakurai) (May, October 2025)

==== Special programs ====
- 1999: Haru made Matenai! Kanjani Isshōkenmei Special Otona e no Kaidan
- 2008: Shinsuke Shimada no Omoide Auction
- 2011: Masaki Aiba no Bartender Dai Sakusen
- 2011: Nihonjin ga Shiritai Sūji no Nazo! Himitsu no Sūji-kun!!
- 2011: Kaiun Shōnen! Miracle J
- 2011: Quiz! Shinmei Kaikoku Gojiten
- 2013: My Fair Boy: Gokujō Danshi no tsukuri kata
- 2015: NTV+Lourve Bijutsukan Tokubetsu Bangumi Sekai Kyokugen Artist Best20
  - 2016: Sekai! Kyokugen Artist Best20
- FNS 27-Jikan TV 2017

==== Music programs ====
- 2013: Gekokujō Karaoke Survival

==== Sports programs ====
- 2014: Me de Supo: Ōen shitaku naru Athlete
- 2014: FIFA World Cup: Brazil Games

=== Dramas ===
- 1999: Mamachari Deka
- 1999: Nekketsu Renai Dō
- 1999: Nana-ri no Samurai: J-ka no Hanran
- 1999: Kowai Nichiyōbi
- 2000: Ike Ike Ikemen!
- 2000: Kowai Nichiyōbi −2000-
- 2001: Shijō Saiaku no Date
- 2001: Neverland
- 2003: Engisha.
- 2004: Hagure Keiji Junjoha
- 2008: Arigatō, Okan
- 2009: My Girl
- 2010: 0-Gōshitsu no Kyaku
- 2011: Inu o Kau to Iu Koto
- 2011: 24 Hour Television Special Drama Iki teru dake de nan kuru nai sa
- 2012: Papadol!
- 2013: Fuji TV Opening 55th Anniversary Special Drama The Genie Family

=== Movies ===
- 2012: Eight Ranger
- 2014: Eight Ranger 2

=== Voice acting ===
- 2011: Crayon Shin-chan: The Storm Called: Operation Golden Spy
- 2017: Monster Hunter Stories: Ride On

=== Radio ===
- 2002: Super Star QR
- 2003: Kanjani Eight: You Yokoyama to Shingo Murakami no Reccomen!
- ABC Music Paradise: Kanjani no Otokomae o Mezase!
- 2004: Shingo Murakami no Shūkan Kanjani Tsūshin
- 2013: Kanjani Eight: Shingo Murakami to Ryuhei Marukawa no Reccomen!
- 2016: Kanjani Eight Shingo Murakami to Johnny's West Akito Kiriyama to Junta Nakama no Reccomen!

=== Advertisements ===
- 1998: Morinaga Milk Industry Eskimo pino
- 2010: Guthy-Renker Japan Proactiv
- 2011: Capcom Monster Hunter Portable 3rd
- 2012: Suntory C.C. Lemon
- Hotto Motto
  - 2013: Roast Cuts Donburi
  - 2013: Chicken Nanban
  - 2013: Yakiniku Bibimbap
- 2013: an
- 2015: Osaka Metropolis OMP Tower
- Nintendo Wii U Mario Kart 8
- 2015: King Paradise Bay
- 2015: Toyo Suisan Men-zukuri
- 2017: Morinaga & Company Ottotto

== Stage ==
- 1997: Kyo to Kyo
- 1997: Mask
- 1998: Kyo to Kyo
- 1999: Tobe! Tobe! Onna-tachi
- 2001: Tōmei Ningen no Jōki
- 2002: Fortin Brass
- 2003: Jarinkochie
- 2008: Mitei "Ichi"
- 2009: If or...
- 2010: If or... II
- 2011: If or... III
- 2012: If or... IV
- 2013: If or... V
- 2014: If or... VI
- 2015: If or... VII
- 2016: If or... VIII
- 2017: If or... IX

== Solo concerts ==
- 2006: 2006 Winter Special Shingo Murakami Solo Live

== Discography ==
=== Solo songs ===
==== CD included tracks ====
- Forward
- One's shadow
- Dear...
- Ai Love You
- Ōsama Clinic by Takatsu-King
- Ottotto

==== CD unrecorded songs ====
In "Job Search Database" of JASRAC's official website, based on the search result of the music including only "Shingo Murakami" as the artist name.

- Jinsei don Tsumari
- Moshimo Guitar ga Hajiketanara
- Babun
