= Ryuhei Maruyama =

Musical artist (born 1983)

Ryuhei Maruyama 丸山 隆平
- Also known as: Maru, Maru-chan, Mr. Unbalance
- Born: November 26, 1983 (age 42)
- Origin: Kyoto, Japan
- Genres: J-pop
- Occupations: Singer; actor; radio host
- Instruments: Bass; vocals
- Years active: 1996–present
- Labels: Teichiku Records; Imperial Records

Ryuhei Maruyama (丸山 隆平, Maruyama Ryūhei; born November 26, 1983) is a Japanese idol, singer, actor and radio host. He is a member of Japanese male idol group Super Eight (previously known as Kanjani Eight), which is under the management of Starto Entertainment and formerly of Johnny & Associates. He is also the group's bassist and one of its main rappers. He was a morning show co-host on Kansai TV. His image color in the group is orange.

== Concerts/tours ==
- X-mas Party [Christmas concerts] (2002–2005) at Osaka Shochiku-za
- Osaka-jo Hall Zenyasai 1st live (Summer 2005)
- F.T.O.N. (Funky Tokyo Osaka Nagoya) 1st tour (Summer 2006)
- 1st Nationwide tour (Fall/Autumn 2006)
- 2nd Nationwide tour (Winter 2006)
- 1st Solo Concert at Osaka Shochiku-za (12/18-12/20 2006)
- What! Really!? Surprise!! Kanjani8 Dome Concert in Osaka (February 24–25, 2007) at Kyocera Dome Osaka

== Activities ==
=== Weekly variety shows ===
- Kanjani no Shiwake Eito 関ジャニの仕分け∞ (TV Asahi, 2011.04.06 -)
- Ariehen Sekai ありえへん∞世界 (with Murakami Shingo and Yasuda Shota)(TV Tokyo, 2008.04.15 -)
- Kanjani8 no Janiben 関ジャニ∞のジャニ勉 (Kansai TV, 2007.05.02 -)
- -ended- Ai No Shura Bara 愛の修羅バラ!(Kansai TV, 2009.04.05 – 2010.12.26)
- -ended- Can!Jani!(TV Asahi, 2008.10.04 – 2009.09.26)
- -ended- Tsukkai Everyday 痛快！エブリデイ (Kansai TV, 2007.04 – 2008.06)
- -ended- Muchaburi(TV Tokyo, 2007.04.03 – 2008.03.25)
- -ended- Honjani (Kansai TV & Fuji TV, 2003.06.10 -2007.04)
- -ended- Suka J (TV Tokyo, 2005.10.04 – 2007.03.27)
- -ended- Mugendai no Gimon (TV Tokyo, 2005.04.05 – 2005.09.27)
- -ended- Urajani (TV Tokyo, 2004.04.06 – 2005.03.29)
- -ended- J³Kansai (Kansai TV, 2002.10.02 – 2003.03.26)

=== TV dramas ===
- Kikazaru Koi ni wa Riyuu ga Atte (着飾る恋には理由があって) (2021)
- Yonimo Kimyuna Monogatari 2013 Spring SP (世にも奇妙な物語 2013年 春の特別編-石油が出た) (2013)
- Nakuna、Harachan (泣くな、はらちゃん) (2013)
- Boys on the Run (ボーイズ・オン・ザ・ラン) (2012)
- 13sai no Hello Work (13歳のハローワーク) (series finale only) (2012)
- O-PARTS (O-PARTS〜オーパーツ〜) (2012)
- Strawberry Night (ストロベリーナイト) (2012)
- Ikiteterudakedenankurunaisa (生きてるだけでなんくるないさ) (2011)
- Job Hopper Buy a House (フリーター、家を買う。) (2010)
- Room 0 (0号室の客) (Second Story only) (2009)
- Uta no Onii-san (歌のおにいさん) (2009)
- Wachigaiya Itosato (輪違屋糸里) (2007)
- Jitensha Shonenki (自転車少年記) (2006)
- Double (複体) (2006)
- Meitantei Catherine Meitantei Catherine vs Totsukawa Keibu (名探偵キャサリンVS十津川警部) (2006)
- Kunitori Monogatari (国盗り物語) (2005)
- Shichinin no Samurai J ke no Hanran (七人のサムライ J家の反乱) (1999)

=== Film ===
- Strawberry Night (2013)
- Eightranger (2012), Shōgo Marunouchi/Orange
- Wild 7 (2011)
- Eight Ranger 2 (2014), Shōgo Marunouchi/Orange
- The Stand-In Thief (2017), Hajime Ōnuki
- Kaneko's Commissary (2025), Kaneko
- Nameless (2026), Teruo
- The Chain of Roses (2026)

=== Stage ===
- Kyo To Kyo (1998)
- Another (2002)
- Douton Boys (2003)
- Summer Storm (2004)
- Hey!Say!Dream Boy(2004)
- Magical Summer (2005)
- Dream Boys(2005)
- Another's Another (2006)
- Dream Boys (2006)
- What's Eating Gilbert Grape (2011)
- BOB (2012)
- Macbeth (2016)

=== Radio ===
- Kanjani8 Murakami Shingo & Maruyama Ryuhei no Recomen! 関ジャニ∞ 村上信五と丸山隆平のレコメン！(Nippon Cultural Broadcasting, JOQR 1134, 2013.04.04 -)
