= You Yokoyama =

You Yokoyama 横山 裕
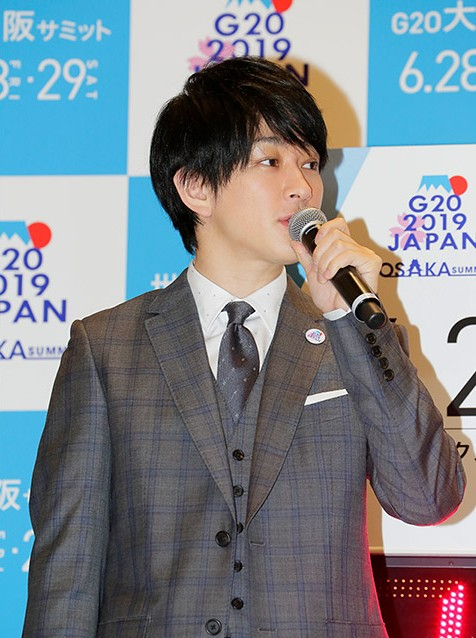
- 2019

Background information
- Born: Kimitaka Yokoyama; May 9, 1981 (age 45)
- Origin: Konohana-ku, Osaka, Japan
- Genres: Enka, pop
- Occupation: Singer
- Years active: 1996–present
- Labels: Teichiku Records, Imperial Records
- Member of: Super Eight

You Yokoyama (横山 裕, Yokoyama Yū; born May 9, 1981) is a Japanese actor and singer, member of Super Eight (previously known as Kanjani Eight), which is under the management of Starto Entertainment, formerly under Johnny & Associates. His image color in the group is black.

== Career ==
Yokoyama began learning how to play guitar around 2022, for the Kanjani Eight song "Kassai". It was his first time playing the guitar, after 18 years of having debuted with his group.

=== Early career ===
Yokoyama entered Johnny's on Christmas 1996. There, he met fellow members Subaru Shibutani and Shingo Murakami. The reason he entered Johnny's is because his mother briefly saw his classmate on TV and said, "My kid is better looking."

=== Acting career ===
Yokoyama has appeared in dramas such as The Quiz Show 2 and Hidarime Tantei EYE.

== Personal life ==
Though mainly known among Kanjani Eight fans, Yokoyama's true name was revealed by him until 2017, when he appeared on Gyōretsu no dekiru hōritsu sōdanjo. Born as Kimitaka Yokoyama (横山 侯隆, Yokoyama Kimitaka), Yokoyama was given a stage name, a rare thing among Johnny's talent. According to Yokoyama, his stage name of "You" was chosen by Johnny Kitagawa, as it was easier to say and read. Mostly called by his last name or his nickname of "Kimi-chan", as longtime friend and fellow Johnny, Arashi's Masaki Aiba calls him, nobody actually refers to him as "You", not even Johnny who is famous for referring to other people as "You".

Yokoyama's mother died at age 50 on May 16, 2010, at 11:51 pm. She collapsed while shopping, and was taken to the hospital in an ambulance. Sources say that it might have been a heart attack. The funeral was held on May 18, which all the members of Kanjani8 attended.

== Discography ==
Solo songs

- "Confusion"
- "Fantastic Music!"
- "Wonder Boy"
- "413man" (Lyrics by Yokoyama)
- "Trickster"

== Filmography ==
=== Drama ===
Year	Title	Role	Notes	Ref.
1998	Don't Worry!	Isamu Igarashi		
1999	47 Ronin	Chikara Ōishi		
1999	Nekketsu Renai Dō	Pinokkiyokoyama		
1999	P.S. I'm Fine, Shunpei	Keisuke Shimokawa		
2000	Ike Ike Ikemen!	Hiro		
2000	Food Fight	Hirōmi Manaka		
2000	Scary Sunday: 2000			
2001	The Worst Date in History	Ginji Naniwa		
2001	Hanran no Voyage	Ten Kuzuyama		
2002	Engimono: Mitsuo	Mitsuo		
2003	Hakusen Nagashi: Age 25	Hijiri Kōsaka		
2005	Gekidan Engimono: Lonely My Room	Natsuki Ōtani		
2006	Kemarishi	Kasuga		
2007	Haikei, Chichiue-sama	Tokio Nakagawa		
2007	Yukan Club	Seishiro Kikumasamune		
2008	Yonimo Kimyō na Monogatari: Dotsukidotsukarete Ikiru no sa	Nakamura		
2009	The Quiz Show 2	Toshio Honma		
2009	Koishite Akuma	Hādēs/Kobayakawa		
2009	Hidarime Tantei Eye Special	Yumeto Tanaka		
2009	0 Gōshitsu no Kyaku	Shiina (Hotel Manager)		
2010	Hidarime Tantei Eye	Yumeto Tanaka		
2011	CONTROL ~Hanzai Shinri Sōsa~	Kei Teranishi		
2011	Zettai Reido: Mizen Hanzai Sennyu Sousa (season 2)	Tōru Yamauchi (guest role)	Getsuku	
2012	13-sai no Hello Work	Kiyofumi Takano		
2012	Papadol!	You Yokoyama (as himself)		
2012	Boys on the Run	Prison Guard (guest role)		
2013	Shikatsushi Joō no Hōigaku	Hajime Inukai		
2014	Suikyuu Yankees	Kurosawa Yoshio		
2016	On	Yasuhisa Shōji		
2018	Zettai Reido: Mizen Hanzai Sennyu Sousa (season 3)	Tōru Yamauchi	Getsuku	
2020	Zettai Reido: Mizen Hanzai Sennyu Sousa (season 4)	Tōru Yamauchi	Getsuku	
2021	Kotarō wa Hitori Gurashi	Shin Karino		
2022–23	Maiagare!	Haruto Iwakura	Asadora	
2025	Marry My Husband	Tomoya Hirano		
2026	Tonight, I Have a Date with a Serial Killer	Shirou Isogai		

=== Movie ===
Year	Title	Role
1998	Shinjuku Shōnen Tanteidan	Akira Suou
2010	8Uppers	Mac
2012	Tenchi Meisatsu	Honinbo Dosaku
2012	Eight Ranger	Makoto Yokomine
2014	Eight Ranger 2	Makoto Yokomine
2017	Hamon: Yakuza Boogie	Keisuke Ninomiya
2018	Kasane	Reita Ugō
2019	The 47 Ronin in Debt	Fuwa Kazuemon

== Stage ==
- Kyo to Kyo (April – November 1998)
- Mask (December 1998)
- Tōa Hiren (October 2001, June – July 2002)
- Aoki-san Ie no Okusan (February 2002)
- Takizawa Enbu Jō (March 2006)
- Dream Boys ( 2006)
- Bluemoon (May 2015)
- 上を下へのジレッタ (May 2017)
- 北齋漫畫 (Hokusai Sketch Book) (June - July 2019)

== Radio ==
- 1994–2002: Furumoto Shinnosuke Chapara Suka Woo! – Chapara Fight Thursdays – Yokoyama You & Murakami Shingo no Warau Daisōsa Sen (JOQR 1134)
- 2002–2003: Super Star Qr (JOQR 1134)
- 2003–2013: Kanjani Eight – Yokoyama You & Murakami Shingo no Recomen! (JOQR 1134)

== Concerts ==
- You Yokoyama ga Yacchaimasu Concert (Osaka Shochikuza Theater) (December 2007)
- You Yokoyama ga Yacchaimasu 2 Concert Spring 2008 (Nagoya and Tokyo) (March 2008)
- You Yokoyama ga Yacchaimasu 3 Concert Spring 2010 (14 prefectures) (April 2 – May 30, 2010)

== Endorsements ==
- Tamagochi (1997)
- Video Sugao 2 Selling (1999)
- Video Sugao 3 Selling (2001)
- TV Guide (December 2007, together with Murakami Shingo)
