= Super Eight discography =

- Studio albums: 11
- Extended plays: 2
- Compilation albums: 2
- Singles: 49
- Video albums: 22

The Japanese boy band Super Eight, formerly known as Kanjani Eight, is a pop idol group managed by Johnny & Associates and works released by Infinity Records. The group, currently, has a total of 36 released singles, 11 studio albums, two mini albums, and fifteen DVD releases. Thirty three of thirty six singles have placed at number-one on the Oricon singles chart. 47, the concert DVD for their 2007 nationwide tour, was the top selling music DVD of 2008.

In 2022, the group were presented a Japan Gold Disc Award in the category Album of the Year/Best5 albums for their album 8beat.

== Albums ==
=== Studio albums ===
Title	Album details	Peak	First week sales	Total sales	RIAJ certifications (sales thresholds)
Title	Album details	JPN	First week sales	Total sales	RIAJ certifications (sales thresholds)
KJ1 F.T.O	Released: March 15, 2006; Label: Teichiku Records (TECH-1028, TECH-1038)	2	161,985	214,317	Platinum
KJ2 Zukkoke Dai Dassō	Released: June 6, 2007; Label: Imperial Records (TECI-8001, TECI-8003, TECI-8005)	1	211,805		Platinum
Puzzle	Released: April 15, 2009; Label: Imperial Records (TECI-8007, TECI-8008)	1	212,058	245,128	Platinum
8 Uppers	Release: October 20, 2010; Label: Imperial Records (TECI-8010, TECI-8011, TECI-8012)	1	231,001	269,241	Platinum
Fight	Release: November 16, 2011; Label: Imperial Records (TECI-****, TECI-****, TECI-****)	1	253,524	314,912	Platinum
Juke Box	Release: October 16, 2013; Label: Imperial (TECI-8026, TECI-8024, TECI-8025)	1	322,957	373,019	Platinum
Kanjanism	Release: November 5, 2014; Label: Infinity	1	294,180	327,752	
Kanjani8 no Genki ga Deru CD!!	Release: November 11, 2015; Label: Infinity	1	315,906	348,197	
Jam (ジャム)	Release: June 28, 2017; Label: Infinity	1	327,493	375,219	
8beat	Release: November 17, 2021; Label: Infinity	1	261,181		
Super Eight	Release: July 31, 2024; Label: Infinity	1	183,310		

=== Mini albums ===
Title	Album details	Peak	RIAJ certifications (sales thresholds)
Title	Album details	JPN	RIAJ certifications (sales thresholds)
Kansha ni Eight	Released: December 15, 2004; Label: Teichiku Records (TECH-1018)	5	Gold
Damdarah (ジャム)	Released: August 5, 2026; Label: Infinity	1	

=== Compilations ===
Title	Album details	Peak	RIAJ certifications (sales thresholds)
Title	Album details	JPN	RIAJ certifications (sales thresholds)
8est	Released: October 17, 2012; Label: Imperial Records (TECH-8018, TECI-8020, TECI-8022)	1	Platinum
Gr8est	Released: May 30, 2018; Label: Infinity Records	1	Platinum

== Singles ==
Year	Album details	Peak	First week sales	Total sales	RIAJ certifications (sales thresholds)	Album
Year	Album details	JPN	First week sales	Total sales	RIAJ certifications (sales thresholds)	Album
2004	"Naniwa Iroha Bushi": Released: Aug 25,2004	1	85,487	175,612		Kansha ni Eight
2005	"Osaka Rainy Blues": Released: March 2, 2004	4	62,010	112,297		KJ1 F.T.O
2005	"Sukiyanen, Osaka/Oh! Enka/Mugendai": Released: Sep 14,2005	2	163,155	248,684	Platinum	KJ1 F.T.O
2006	"Osaka Obachan Rock/Osaka Romanesque": Released: June 7, 2006	2	170,257	203,032	Platinum	KJ1 F.T.O; KJ2 Zukkoke Dai Dassō
2006	"Kan Fu Fighting": Released: Dec 13,2006	1	264,183	342,718	Platinum	KJ2 Zukkoke Dai Dassō
2007	"Zukkoke Otoko Michi": Released: April 11, 2007	1	196,733	239,415	Platinum	KJ2 Zukkoke Dai Dassō
2007	"It's My Soul": Released: Oct 17,2007	1	193,738	232,187	Platinum	Puzzle
2008	"Wahaha": Released: March 12, 2008	1	194,304	229,094	Platinum	Puzzle
2008	"Musekinin Hero": Released: Oct 29,2008	1	347,735	400,522	Platinum	Puzzle
2009	"Kyū Jō Show!!": Released: Nov 4,2009	1	271,516	310,028	Platinum	8 Uppers
2009	"Gift ~Shiro~ Gift": Released: Dec 23,2009	1	116,814	136,003	Gold	
2009	"Gift ~Aka~ Gift": Released: Dec 24,2009	1	114,402	136,508	Gold	
2009	"Gift ~Midori~ Gift": Released: Dec 25,2009	1	114,001	133,978	Gold	
2010	"Wonderful World!!": Released: June 30, 2010	1	245,064	277,297	Platinum	8 Uppers
2010	"Life (Me no Mae no Mukou e)": Released: Aug 25,2010	1	256,245	314,633	Platinum	8 Uppers
2011	"T.W.L/Yellow Pansy Street": Released: April 4, 2011	1	200,816	257,532	Platinum	FIGHT
2011	"My Home": Released: May 11, 2011	1	158,060	190,942	Gold	FIGHT
2011	"365 Nichi Kazoku": Released: June 8, 2011	1	158,141	185,789	Gold	FIGHT
2011	"Tsubusa ni Koi": Released: Aug 17,2011	1	152,859	187,162	Gold	FIGHT
2012	"Ai Deshita": Released: June 13, 2012	1	262,044	320,716	Platinum	8EST
2012	"ER" (as Eight Ranger): Released: July 25, 2012	1	330,854	376,563	Platinum	8EST
2012	"Aoppana": Released: Sep 5, 2012	1	208,039	242,364	Platinum	JUKE BOX
2013	"Hesomagari/Koko Ni Shikanai Keshiki": Released: April 24, 2013	1	295,076	334,632	Platinum	JUKE BOX
2013	"Namida no Kotae": Released: June 12, 2013	1	248,754	286,657	Platinum	JUKE BOX
2013	"Kokoro Sora Moyou": Released: December 4, 2013	1	192,573	241,831	Platinum	KANJANISM
2014	"Hibiki": Released: January 15, 2014	1	206,091	263,553	Platinum	KANJANISM
2014	"King of Otoko": Released: February 19, 2014	1	352,888	389,313	Platinum	KANJANISM
2014	"Omoidama": Released: July 2, 2014	1	168,866	207,240	Gold	KANJANISM
2014	"ER2": Released: August 6, 2014	1	208,000	241,824	Platinum	KANJANISM
2014	"Ittajanaika/CloveR": Released: October 15, 2014	1	271,021	308,369	Platinum	KANJANI8 NO GENKI GA DERU CD!!
2014	"Gamushara Kōshinkyoku": Released: December 3, 2014	1	201,022	201,022	Platinum	KANJANI8 NO GENKI GA DERU CD!!
2015	"Tsuyoku Tsuyoku Tsuyoku": Released: June 3, 2015	1	156,000	173,795	Gold	KANJANI8 NO GENKI GA DERU CD!!
2015	"Maemuki Scream": Released: August 5, 2015	1	282,644	315,682	Platinum	KANJANI8 NO GENKI GA DERU CD!!
2015	"Samurai Song": Released: dec , 2015	1	147,943	157,403	Gold	JAM
2016	"Tsumi to Natsu": Released: July 6, 2016	1	-	300,357	Platinum	JAM
2016	"Panorama": Released: October 12, 2016	1	-	180,218	Gold	JAM
2016	"NOROSHI": Released: December 7, 2016	1	-	232,695	Platinum	JAM
2017	"Naguri Gaki BEAT": Released: January 25, 2017	1	-	310,220		JAM
2017	"Kiseki no Hito": Released: September 6, 2017	1		282,351		
2017	"Otou Seyo": Released: November 15, 2017	1		234,060		
2018	"Koko ni": Released: September 5, 2018	1	247,357			
2019	"crystal": Released: March 6, 2019	1	214,369			
2019	"Tomo yo": Released: November 27, 2019	1	260,162			
2020	"Kimi to mitai sekai": Released: February 10, 2020	1	218,927			
2020	"Re:Live": Released: August 19, 2020	1	334,392			
2021	"Hitori ni shinai yo": Released: June 23, 2021	1	202,025			
2022	"Kassai": Released: July 6, 2022	1	150,840			
2023	"Mikansei": Released: May 10, 2023	1	206,752			
2023	"Ōkami to Suisei": Released: August 9, 2023	1	154,598			
2024	"Anthropos": Released: January 24, 2024	1	159,384			

== Videos ==
=== Concert ===
Year	Video details	Peak	RIAJ certifications (sales thresholds)
Year	Video details	JPN	RIAJ certifications (sales thresholds)
2005	Live DVD: Excite!!: Released: March 29, 2005	1	
2005	Spirits!!: Released: November 23, 2005	3	Gold
2006	Heat Up!: Released: September 6, 2006	1	Gold
2007	47: Released: December 12, 2007	1	Platinum
2009	Tour 2009 Puzzle: Released: September 23, 2009	1	Platinum
2010	Countdown Live 2009–2010 in Kyocera Dome Osaka: Released: March 31, 2010	1	Gold
2011	Live Tour 2010-2011 8uppers: Released: April 13, 2011	1	Gold
2012	Godai Dome Tour Eight X Eighter: Released: March 21, 2012	1	Gold
2013	KANJANI8 LIVE TOUR!! 8EST - Minna no Omoi wa Donandai? Bokura no Omoi wa Mugendai!!: Released: March 13, 2013	1	Platinum
2014	Kanjani∞ Live tour Jukebox: Released: April 30, 2014	1	Platinum
2014	Jussai: Released: December 24, 2014	1	Platinum
2015	関ジャニズム LIVE TOUR 2014≫2015 (Kanjanism): Released: May 11, 2015	1	
2016	関ジャニ∞リサイタル "Omae no haato wo tsukandaru!!" (Kanjani Recital): Released: February 8, 2016	1	
2016	Kanjani Eito no Genki ga Deru Live!!: Released: June 27, 2016	1	
2016	関ジャニ∞リサイタル "Manatsu no orera wa tsumi na yatsu" (Kanjani Recital): Released: November 28, 2016	1	
2017	関ジャニ’sエイターテインメント (Kanjani's Eightertainment): Released: May 22, 2017	1	
2018	関ジャニ’sエイターテインメント ジャム (Kanjani's Eightertainment Jam): Released: March 7, 2018	1	Platinum
2019	関ジャニ'sエイターテインメント GR8EST(Kanjani's Eightertainment GR8EST): Released: January 23, 2019	1	
2019	十五祭(Jyugosai): Released: October 30, 2019	1	
2022	KANJANI’S Re:LIVE 8BEAT: Released: May 18, 2022	1	
2022	KANJANI∞ STADIUM LIVE 18祭: Released: November 30, 2022	1	
2023	KANJANI∞ STADIUM LIVE 18祭: Released: June 28, 2023	1	
2025	超 ARENA TOUR 2024 SUPER EIGHT: Released: May 14, 2025	1	Gold
2025	超 DOME TOUR 二十祭: Released: July 16, 2025	1	
