= List of Hot 100 number-one singles of 2011 (Japan) =

This is a list of number one singles on the Billboard Japan Hot 100 chart in Japan in 2011. The week's most popular songs in Japan, ranked by the Hanshin Corporation and based on radio airplay measured by Plantech and sales data as compiled by SoundScan Japan.

== Chart history ==
Date	Song	Artist
January 3	"A Winter Fairy Is Melting a Snowman"	Kaela Kimura
January 17	"Toilet no Kamisama"	Kana Uemura
January 24	"Dada"	Radwimps
January 31	"If"	French Kiss
February 7	"Why? (Keep Your Head Down)"	Tohoshinki
February 14	"Ultimate Wheels"	KAT-TUN
February 21	"Each Other's Way (Tabi no Tochū)"	Exile
February 28	"Sakura no Ki ni Narō"	AKB48
March 7	"Lotus"	Arashi
March 14	"Eternal"	Jin Akanishi
March 21	"Yume Tamago"	NYC
March 28	"Shūmatsu Not Yet"	Not Yet
April 4	"Utsukushiki Hitobito no Uta"	Maximum the Hormone
April 11	"Born This Way"	Lady Gaga
April 18	"Kazoe Uta"	Mr. Children
April 25	"Sayonara Kizu Darake no Hibi yo"	B'z
May 2	"T.W.L"	Kanjani Eight
May 9	"Mr. Taxi"	Girls' Generation
May 16	"Mr. Taxi"	Girls' Generation
May 23	"My Home"	Kanjani Eight
May 30	"White"	KAT-TUN
June 6	"Everyday, Kachūsha"	AKB48
June 13	"Everyday, Kachūsha"	AKB48
June 20	"365 Nichi Kazoku"	Kanjani Eight
June 27	"Time"	KinKi Kids
July 4	"Flower"	Atsuko Maeda
July 11	"Over"	Hey! Say! JUMP
July 18	"Naminori Kakigōri"	Not Yet
July 25	"Fui ni"	Tomomi Itano
August 1	"Superstar"	Tohoshinki
August 8	"Pareo wa Emerald"	SKE48
August 15	"Run for You"	KAT-TUN
August 22	"Everybody Go"	Kis-My-Ft2
August 29	"Tsubusa ni Koi"	Kanjani Eight
September 5	"Flying Get"	AKB48
September 12	"Kazoku ni Narō yo"	Masaharu Fukuyama
September 19	"Niji no Uta"	Tsuyoshi Domoto
September 26	"Rising Sun/Itsuka Kitto…"	Exile
October 3	"Magic Power"	Hey! Say! JUMP
October 10	"Bo Peep Bo Peep"	T-ara
October 17	"Omoidasenakunaru Sono Hi Made"	Back Number
October 24	"XXX"	L'Arc-en-Ciel
October 31	"Zero"	Bump of Chicken
November 7	"Kaze wa Fuiteiru"	AKB48
November 14	"Meikyū Love Song"	Arashi
November 21	"Okie Dokie"	SKE48
November 28	"Sexy Zone"	Sexy Zone
December 5	"Anata e/Ooo Baby"	Exile
December 12	"Birth"	KAT-TUN
December 19	"Ue kara Mariko"	AKB48
December 26	"We Never Give Up!"	Kis-My-Ft2
