= List of Super Eight concerts =

Japanese boy band Kanjani Eight have gone on a total of nine concert tours, all domestic, and several shows. In 2006, they went on their first tour F.T.O.N: Funky Tokyo Osaka Nagoya, at the three major cities the concert tour was named after. Upon the success of the initial tour, it was expanded into a national tour in the fall of that same year, performing at a total of 11 cities and 26 performances. Winter of that same year, Kanjani Eight performed a national promo tour for the release of their single "Kan Fu Fighting". performing at a total of six cities and performing twenty six times.

In 2007, Kanjani Eight begun their biggest national tour to date, the "Eh?! Honma?! Bikkuri!! Tour". The concert tour began in the spring of 2007 and ended in the fall of that same year, totaling at 113 performances in all 47 prefectures of Japan. The concert tour also marked the first time in which a signed Johnny's talent performed in every prefecture of Japan in a single tour. After the success of that tour in 2008, Kanjani Eight performed two national tours between May and August performing at a total fourteen cities and over fifty performances.

Kanjani Eight released Puzzle in 2009 and the national tour Puzzle in the summer of that year. Following up that tour in the winter of 2009, they returned to the Kyocera Dome and performed their first Countdown Live concert series. In the winter of 2010, Kanjani Eight performed their 8 Uppers concert tour, which also contained their second Countdown Live. In 2011, Kanjani Eight performed their winter tour which consisted five cities for a total of ten performances. This tour also contained their third countdown live. In 2012, Kanjani Eight performed their 8EST concert tour, which was a total of 40 performances. This tour is noted for the fact that they performed at their first stadium and for that it did not include a countdown live.

== Concert tours ==
Year	Title	Duration	Number of performances	Tickets Sold
2006	Kanjani Eight Concert Tour 2006 Funky Tokyo Osaka Nagoya (関ジャニ∞ Concert Tour 2006 Funky Tokyo Osaka Nagoya)	May 3, 2006 - June 4, 2006	20	
The Funky Tokyo Osaka Nagoya tour was Kanjani Eight's first concert tour. It supported their debut album, KJ1 F.T.O. It was released on DVD in September 2006 titled "Heat Up! Concert Tour 2006 Funky Tokyo Osaka Nagoya LIVE at Yoyogi National Gymnasium"
2006	Kanjani Eight Zenkoku 1st Tour 2∞6 (関ジャニ∞ 全国1st Tour 2006)	September 9, 2006 - October 28, 2006	26	
The National 1st Tour 2006 was Kanjani Eight's 1st national concert tour. It supported their debut album, KJ1 F.T.O. There was no DVD release.
2006	Kanjani Eight Kan Fu Fighting Zenkoku Tour 2006 Dai Ni-Dan (関ジャニ∞ KAN FU FIGHTING 全国ツアー 2006 第2弾)	December 2, 2006 - December 29, 2006	20	
The Kan Fu Fighting Zenkoku Tour 2006 Dai Ni-Dan was Kanjani Eight's second national tour and acted as a promotional tour to support the release of Kanjani Eight's single "Kan Fu Fighting".
2007	Kanjani Eight Eh! Honma!? Bikkuri!! Tour 2007 (関ジャニ∞ えっ! ホンマ!? ビックリ!! TOUR 2007)	May 3, 2007 - September 30, 2007	113	660,000
The Eh! Honma!? Bikkuri!! Tour was Kanjani Eight's third national tour and first ever tour that encompassed every prefecture in Japan. It began at Yokohama Arena and ended at the Okinawa Convention Center. This tour marked the first time that Kanjani Eight performed at Tokyo Dome. The tour supported the release of their sophomore album KJ2 Zukkoke Dai Dassō. A DVD titled 47 was released in December 2007 and was also followed up by a photobook titled "05.03-09.30 Kanjani∞ All Over Japan Tour 2007 Documentary Photobook" documenting the entire tour.
2008	Kanjani Eight Live Tour 2008 Eight da yo! Zen'in Shūgō (KANJANI∞ LIVE TOUR 2008 ∞だよ!全員集合)	April 3, 2008 - May 18, 2008	24	
The Eight da yo! Zen'in Shūgō tour was Kanjani Eight's fourth national tour. It mostly supported the singles released within the last two years as well as debuting original unit songs. This tour was the first of its kind not to feature the Kanjani Sentai Eight Ranger skits or have juniors as back up dancers. No DVD was released for this tour.
2008	Kanjani Eight Live Tour 2008 Eight da yo! Zen'in Shūgō Natsu da! Tour da!! Wahaha!!! (KANJANI∞ LIVE TOUR 2008 ∞だよ!全員集合 夏だ!ツアーだ!!ワッハッハー!!!)	July 6, 2008 - August 31, 2008	30	
The Wahaha!!! tour was the second extension from their spring tour of the same name. The tour was in support of the release of their single "Wahaha". No DVD was released for this tour.
2009	Kanjani Eight Tour 2009 Puzzle (関ジャニ∞ TOUR 2009 PUZZLE)	May 10, 2009 - July 30, 2009	27	
The Puzzle tour was Kanjani Eight's fifth national tour and in support of the release of their third studio album Puzzle. The tour begun at Hiroshima Green Arena and ended at Oita B-Con Plaza Convention Center. This concert was the return of the Kanjani Sentai Eight Rangers skits. It was released on DVD in September 2009.
2010–2011	Kanjani Eight Live Tour 2010-2011 8 Uppers (KANJANI∞ LIVE TOUR 2010→2011 8UPPERS)	October 30, 2010 - January 1, 2011	16	
The 8 Uppers tour was Kanjani Eight's sixth national tour and in support of the release of their fourth album 8 Uppers. The tour's theme was based upon the movie that came with the album's release and in result did not contain the Kanjani Sentai Eight Ranger skits. The tour also contained their Countdown Live performance and was released on DVD March 30, 2011. The DVD also contained a photobook of photos from the tour as well as from their Countdown Live.
2011–2012	Kanjani Eight Big 5 Dome Tour Eight x Eighter Omonnakattara DOME suimasen (KANJANI∞ 大五ドームTOUR EIGHT x EIGHTER おもんなかったらドームすいません)	November 23, 2011 - January 1, 2012	10	470,000
The Big 5 Dome Tour Eight x Eighter " Sorry if it's not interesting " was Kanjani Eight's seventh national tour and in support of the release of their fifth album, "Fight". The tour's theme was based upon the album's theme of baseball and featured the band in baseball inspiration uniforms for the promotional material of the concert tour. This tour did not feature the fan favorite Kanjani Sentai Eight Ranger skits and instead replaced the usual thirty-minute performance with additional songs. The tour started at Sapporo Dome in Hokkaido and ended at Kyocera Dome Osaka in Osaka. This concert also featured a countdown live, which was broadcast on Fuji Television's Johnny's Countdown, and featured as a digest on the DVD/Blu-ray release of that performance. The December 31t/January 1 performance was released on DVD and Blu-ray on March 21, 2012.
2012 - 2013	Kanjani Eight Live Tour 8EST Minna no omoi wa dou nan dai? Bokura no omoi wa mugendai! (KANJANI∞ LIVE TOUR 8EST みんなの想いはどうなんだい？僕らの想いは無限大！)	September 15, 2012 - January 1, 2013	41	880,000
The 8EST " Everyone how are ya feeling? Our feelings are infinite! " concert tour was a series of performances that was in support of the release of their first Best Of album, Eight x Eighter = 8EST (pronounced Eightest). It was also in celebration of their 8th anniversary that year. The tour started at Ajinomoto Stadium in Tokyo, the largest venue the group has performed at to date, and originally was to end at Nagoya's Nihon Gaishi Sports Plaza. Though, slightly two weeks into the tour, additional dome performances in Osaka and Tokyo were added to the tour lineup. This marked the first time that the band had performed at a stadium, dome, and arena all within the same tour. The tour concluded itself at Kyocera Dome Osaka on January 1, 2013. This tour did not have a countdown live, as they were scheduled to appear at the 63rd Annual Kouhaku Uta Gassen.

Year	Tour title	Date	Venue	Number of performances	Tickets Sold
2013	KANJANI∞ LIVE TOUR JUKE BOX	November 8 - January 19, 2014	Sapporo Dome; Fukuoka Yahuoku! Dome; Tokyo Dome; Nagoya Dome; Kyocera Dome Osaka	13	600,000
2014	Jyussai (十祭)	August 9 - August 24	Ajinomoto Stadium; Yanmar Stadium Nagai	4	220,000
2014	Kanjanism LIVE TOUR 2014 - 2015 (関ジャニズム LIVE TOUR 2014→2015)	November 16 - January 12, 2015	Sapporo Dome; Fukuoka Yahuoku! Dome; Tokyo Dome; Nagoya Dome; Kyocera Dome Osaka	13	600,000
2015	Kanjani8 Recital We Will Capture Your Heart (関ジャニ∞リサイタル お前のハートをつかんだる!!)	July 18 - September 13	World Memorial Hall; Sun Arena sundome Fukui; M-Wave; Morioka Ice Arena; Kagoshima Arena; Sekisui Heim Super Arena; Ecopa Arena	24	230,000
2015	Kanjani8 No Genki ga deru LIVE (関ジャニ∞の元気が出るLIVE!!)	December 13 - January 17, 2016	Sapporo Dome; Fukuoka Yahuoku! Dome; Tokyo Dome; Nagoya Dome; Kyocera Dome Osaka	14	650,000
2016	Kanjani8 recital Manatsu no orera ha tsumi na yatsu (関ジャニ∞リサイタル 真夏の俺らは罪なヤツ)	July 30 - September 28	Makuhari Messe; Saitama Super Arena; Wakayama Big Whale; Nippon Gaishi Hall; Okinawa Convention Center; Asty Tokushima; Toki Messe	21	265,000
2016	kanjani's Entertainment (関ジャニ'sエイターテインメント)	December 10 - January 15, 2017	Sapporo Dome; Fukuoka Yahuoku! Dome; Tokyo Dome; Nagoya Dome; Kyocera Dome Osaka	14	750,000
2017	kanjani's Entertainment JAM (関ジャニ'sエイターテインメント ジャム)	July 15 - September 10	Sapporo Dome; Fukuoka Yahuoku! Dome; Tokyo Dome; Nagoya Dome; Kyocera Dome Osaka	14	650,000
2018	KANJANI'S EIGHTERTAINMENT GR8EST	July 15 - November 18	Sapporo Dome; Fukuoka Yahuoku! Dome; Tokyo Dome; Nagoya Dome; Kyocera Dome Osaka	14	650,000
2018	KANJANI'S EIGHTERTAINMENT GR8EST in Taipei	September 22 - September 23	Taipei Arena	2	22,000
2019	Jyugosai (十五祭)	July 14 - September 3	Sapporo Dome; Fukuoka Yahuoku! Dome; Tokyo Dome; Nagoya Dome; Kyocera Dome Osaka	12	550,000
2020	UPDATE	November 6 - April 29, 2021			

== Other performances ==
Year	Title	Duration	Number of performances
2002–2005	Kanjani Eight Xmas Party (関ジャニ8 Xmasパーティー)	December 12, 2002 - December 25, 2002; December 18, 2003 - December 25, 2003; December 18, 2004 - December 25, 2004; December 16, 2005 - December 25, 2005	88
The Kanjani Eight Xmas Party series of concerts were performed at the Osaka Shochikuza theater for five years. The concerts were a mixture of skits and singing with a Christmas theme. Their 2004 performance was eventually released on DVD, titled "Excite!!", on March 30, 2005.
2006	Kansha ni Eight in Tokyo (感謝 ni ∞ in東京)	November 27, 2004	3
The Kansha ni ∞Eight in Tokyo Concert was a performance at the Tokyo International Forum in support of the release of their mini album and debut, Kansha ni ∞.
2006	Kanjani Eight Eh! Honma!? Bikkuri!! Dome Concert in Osaka (関ジャニ∞ えっ! ホンマ!? ビックリ!! ドームコンサートin大阪)	February 24–25, 2007	3
The Eh! Honma?! Bikkuri!! Dome Concert in Osaka performance was a series of performances in their hometown of Osaka.
2007	Kanjani Eight Dome Concert 2009-2010 (関ジャニ∞ DOME CONCERT 2009-2010)	December 30, 2009 - January 1, 2010	4
The Dome Concert series was a group of performances for the New Year Weekend. A segment of their December 31 performance was telecasted on Fuji Television's Johnny's Countdown Live. The performance was eventually released on DVD on March 31, 2010, titled as Countdown Live 2009 - 2010 in Kyocera Dome.
2012	Matsubara Shinichi Presents Sugohachi (松原信一 Presents すごはち)	August 8, 2012	1
Matsubara Shinichi Presents Sugohachi was a free live performance for fans who won a lottery after purchasing the Ai Deshita and ER release. The performance featured singing and games focused on Kanjani Eight's eight years as a debut unit, hosted by martial arts master Matsubara Shinichi, an alter-ego of band member Subaru Shibutani. A digest of Sugohachi was released on the limited edition A release of Eight x Eighter = 8EST.
2012	Hasai Bokura mo Hacchai, Hacchake Matsuri (∞祭 僕らも８っちゃい、８っちゃけまつり)	August 4–5, 2012; August 10h - 12, 2012	25
Hasai, or 8sai, was a festival celebrating Kanjani Eight's 8th anniversary. The tickets were available to the public through lottery and then eventually sold openly through ticket PiA until a week before the Tokyo performances as first-come, first-served. The took place at Makuhari Messe in Tokyo on August 4 and the 5 and concluded at Intex Osaka in Cosmosquare, Osaka City on August 10–12. The festival split up attendees into five groups (selectable by the attendee) which were assigned separate times to enter the event. The event had five portions, two of which involved a live and talk performance from Kanjani8 themselves. Throughout 8sai, Kanjani Eight played a series of games in front of a live audience to determine who would have center position on the next album release. The two worst performing members would have to go on a romantic date. The winner and losers of the games were determined on the last talk on August 12, 2012. A digest of 8sai, including all the games, was featured on the limited edition A release of Eight x Eighter = 8EST. The song that the winner was center on as well as the losers' date was featured on the limited edition B of the same release.
