= Fight (Kanjani Eight album) =

FIGHT
- Regular Edition Cover

Studio album by Kanjani Eight
- Released: November 17, 2011
- Recorded: 2011
- Genre: J-pop, rock
- Length: 1:02:09
- Label: Imperial
- Producer: Izuru Murakami, Masami Yoshikawa, Julie. K, Johnny H. Kitagawa

Kanjani Eight chronology
8 Uppers (2010)	FIGHT (2011)	8EST (2012)

Alternative cover

Singles from FIGHT
- 1. "T.W.L/Yellow Pansy Street" Released: April 20, 2011; 2. "My Home" Released: May 11, 2011; 3. "365 Nichi Kazoku" Released: June 8, 2011; 4. "Tsubusa ni Koi" Released: August 17, 2011

Fight (stylized as FIGHT) is the fifth studio album released by the Japanese boy band Kanjani Eight. Fight was announced on September 8, 2011, as a new untitled album. On October 17, 2011, its release date and title were announced. There were three versions of this release: a 2 Disc regular edition and two CD+DVD limited editions. The first press release of the regular edition contains 7 trading cards while limited editions A and B contain a 48-page photo book. It was released on November 16, 2011. This album marked one year and three weeks since the release of their previous album, 8 Uppers.

Production for Fight began with the announcement of a triple single release along the course of three months: "T.W.L/Yellow Pansy Street", "My Home", "365 Nichi Kazoku". These singles served as the theme songs for a movie and two television dramas. Another single, "Tsubusa ni Koi", was released in August 2011. All, of which, were commercial successes. Fight is a pop/rock-oriented album that incorporates elements of dance, R&B, ska and other genres to fill out the overall production. The album uses several instruments such as horns, drums, guitars, strings, and synthesizers. Kanjani Eight worked with several songwriters over the course of the album's production such as KenKen of RIZE, Yujin Kitagawa of Yuzu, and Sukimaswitch. They provided their own original material for the solo disc that came with the regular edition.

Commercially, Fight was a success, debuting at number one on the Oricon and Billboard Japan weekly charts. The album went on to be the twenty-first top sold album of 2011 on the Oricon and twenty-third on the Billboard Japan charts, respectively.

== Background and development ==
—Shota Yasuda speaking to Potato about his favorite Kanjani Eight song of the moment.

The feeling of the hook, the feeling of the instruments, the song itself... all of it I really like (about My Home). I don't remember much from the recording, but I do remember thinking while listening to everyone's singing coming together, " This is a really good song ".

For Fight, several songs from the album were penned by top artists in the Japanese songwriting world, such as KenKen of RIZE, Yujin Kitagawa of Yuzu, Sukimaswitch and many others. Shota Yasuda, who is a member of Kanjani Eight, was also given the opportunity to write a song for the album. Takeshi, known for writing several Johnny's songs over the years, again returned to write for this album. Rock'A'Trench also returned from previously working 8Uppers to provide for the album as well.

As with their previous albums, Kanjani Eight also worked on their own solo material. For this time around, the solo disc that came with the regular edition of Fight contained two unit songs and two solos. Ryo Nishikido and Subaru Shibutani wrote the lyrics to their solo pieces, "Ah" and "Scarecrow", while Nishikido also composed his own music. Shibutani also took charge for a good portion of the song's overall production. Shota Yasuda wrote the lyrics and composed the music for his unit piece with Tadayoshi Ohkura and Shingo Murakami, titled "Yoru na Yoru na ☆ Yō NIGHT". Ohkura and Murakami also helped in the production. Ryuhei Maruyama and You Yokoyama were the only two that did not compose anything for their own song but assisted with the production.

Upon wrapping up production, Fight was announced in September 2011 and song credits were released in October. The album dropped on November 14, 2011, with "Monjai Beat" becoming the support track for the album's release.

== Composition ==
"Fight for the Eight"
A 27-second sample of the song features Kanjani8 singing over a horn-heavy background

"Dye D?"
A 26-second sample of the song's chorus that displays the song's usage of English.

"365 Nichi Kazoku"
A 28-second sample of the song's gradual addition of instruments as it ends

Fight follows the same theme as the band's previous album by continuing a mixture of generic Jpop, pop/rock, and R&B styles. While not as mature in sound as their last album, Fight is more upbeat and faster, following the feeling of the excitement of a sports game; which is the album's image theme. The album opens up with "Monjai Beat", a fast pop/rock song with Ska influences. You Yokoyama yells, " Eight! Home run!! ", followed by the rest of band echoing him, setting the entire 'baseball' theme for the album. The song features Tatsuya Nakamura, KenKen (Rize), and Tomoyasu Kamiharako. The second track on the album, "Uchū ni Ikitta Lion", slows the pace down just a bit with a standard pop/rock style and uses the falsettos of Ryuhei Maruyama and Shota Yasuda for the repeating, "Far away", on the track. The title song and third track off of the album, "Fight for the Eight", begins with a rough guitar riff before being joined with a drum beat. Vocally, the song is carried by the harmonies of each member, having them duet within a relative key to each other.

The fourth track and first single off the album, "T.W.L", is a high paced pop song that is carried by a horn section. The lyrics heavily rely on bilingual word puns, such as, " Akete meeting you/Hiraku to be loved " which, when sung, sound like " Akete mite yo/Hiraku tobira (Try opening it/Open the doors)". The fifth track, " Fly High ", is a similar up beat song, and is followed by the album's sixth track and third single, "365 Nichi Kazoku", a slow ballad that initially starts off slow but steadily increases as more instruments are added to the overall composition.

Shota Yasuda, one of Kanjani Eight's members, writes and composes "Dye D?", the seventh track on the album. The song begins with a generic 80's hook with Ryo Nishikido, Tadayoshi Ohkura and Ryuhei Maruyama singing in English. The song then picks up for the main verse, which is sung in Japanese by Shingo Murakami and Shota Yasuda, before switching back to English for the bridge and chorus, which is carried by Subaru Shibutani. Yasuda continues into the second hook, which then Yokoyama starts the second verse in Japanese, and Nishikido and Ohkura leading into the instrumental in English. The song then promptly changes into a baroque-inspired instrumental break filled with off-beat pauses before suddenly ending and the song returning to its original composition. It continues out till the end with Shibutani repeating the hook and chorus.

The second half of the album breaks from the pop/rock theme and switches into a more generic, idol, sound with songs such as: "Water Drop", "Freedom Rion", and "Kagayakeru Butai e". Singles, "Yellow Pansy Street", "Tsubusa ni Koi", "My Home" serve as breaks in-between the album originals before the album closes with the ballad, "wander", a lyrically heavy song that is filled emotional encouragement. " Give me the reason, I want to hold on to it/As I stand in a field I trust/I breath out as I continue on this path/Holding my head up proudly/As beautiful flowers bloom from my footprints/Where to wonder? I want to send true love ", they sing in the final chorus.

== Critical reception ==
There were barely any critical reviews published once Fight was released due to policies set by Johnny and Associates, but for the reviews out there, they were generally positive. Yamadato Moko of Rooftop commented with, " Enka, Rock, Pop, Dance Tunes... There are a lot of genres packed into one disc. There's probably a lot of people out there, while noticing this piece, who turn down anything Johnny's and that's understandable, but with the number of artists providing so much to this album, even a person in the livehouse scene would like this (album). "

== Chart performance ==
For the Oricon, Fight debuted at number one on the daily album ranking charts, with a total of 143,367 units sold dated November 15, 2011. On the album's fourth day of sales, the Oricon daily ranking charts reported that Fight had sold a total of 227,847 units, surpassing their fourth album, 8Uppers, in first week end-sales and maintaining its number one hold. For the ending week of November 14, 2011, the Oricon weekly album ranking reported that Fight was the number one album, with a total of 253,524 units sold. It earned the number two spot on the Oricon monthly album ranking for the month of November with a total of 274,590 units sold and had earned the number twenty-one spot for the Oricon album yearly ranking chart of 2011.

For the Billboard Japan Top Album, Fight debuted at number one dated November 28, 2011. For its following week, the album had dropped five spots to number six. In its third week it had dropped ten more spots to number sixteen. On January 5, 2011, Fight sat at number thirty with a total of six weeks on the charts. For the Billboard Japan Year End charts, Fight had ranked at the number twenty-three spot for the year of 2011.

Fight was certified platinum by the Recording Industry Association of Japan for selling 250,000 units.

== Singles ==
In March 2011, it was announced that Kanjani Eight would release three singles consecutively for three months. The first single released was "T.W.L/Yellow Pansy Street", a double A-side single featuring the theme songs for the Crayon Shin-chan movie Crayon Shin-chan: The Storm Called: Operation Golden Spy. The single immediately shot to the top of the Oricon upon release, lasting a total of 17 weeks on the weekly charts. The music videos for the release feature Kanjani Eight singing in front of a green-screened set, interacting with Crayon Shin-chan-inspired caricatures of themselves for "T.W.L" and the band performing in a Beatles-inspired get up for "Yellow Pansy Street". Following up that release was "My Home", released May 11, 2011, and "365 Nichi Kazoku", released June 8, 2011, two singles serving as theme songs for the Japanese television dramas Inu wo Kau to Iu koto ~Sky to Waga ga Uchi no 180 Nichi ~ and Umareru. Both singles reached the top spots on the weekly Oricon upon release and remained on the charts for 13 weeks. The music video for "My Home" involved Kanjani Eight remodeling a home that they lived in with interspersed scenes of them playing as a band in the completed home. The music video for "365 Nichi Kazoku" had the band sing on the stage of an auditorium in front of a string orchestra with interspersed scenes of a son fighting, and eventually, making up with his mother.

Two months later, on August 17, 2011, Kanjani Eight released their fourth single for the year titled "Tsubusa ni Koi". The song served as the ending theme for the drama, Zenkai Girl. It ranked number one upon release and stayed 9 weeks on the Oricon weekly single charts. The music video for "Tsubusa ni Koi" had the band perform in a garden with interspersed scenes of each individual member singing in CGI generated scenes consisting of skies, fields, and clovers.

For all the single releases this year, some of the members had either starring or supporting roles in productions that their music served as theme songs for. Tadayoshi Ohkura and Shingo Murakami made a guest appearance in Crayon Shin-chan: Operation Golden Spy, Ohkura also had a role in Umareru. Ryo Nishikido had the male lead in both Inu wo Kau to iu Koto and Zenkai Girl.

== Promotion ==
To promote Fight, Kanjani Eight performed at several music variety programs in Japan as well as hold a concert tour. In October, the album was announced, and in November the band begun visiting several music programs such as Music Station and Music Lovers. On October 14, 2011, they had performed "T.W.L" and, album's support track, "Monjai Beat" on Music Station's 3 Hour Special. On October 30, they appeared on NTV's Music Lovers to promote the album as well as performed "Life (Me no Mae no Mukou e)" and "Monjai Beat" live." The four singles off of the album were used as theme songs: "T.W.L/Yellow Pansy Street", "My Home", "365 Nichi Kazoku", and "Tsubusa ni Koi". And the song, "Monjai Beat", also served as the ending theme to their weekly show, Janiben.

Fight received additional promotion when the band went on tour in November 2011 with their concert tour titled, Kanjani8: 5 Big Dome Tour Eight x Eighter: Sorry if it isn't Enjoyable Tour. It started at Sapporo Dome on November 23, 2011, and concluded at Kyocera Dome on January 1, 2012. Tickets were sold through the fanclub and on October 28, 2011, Johnny's International opened up ticket balloting for international fans to attend the Sapporo performance. Portions of their December 31 performance was also telecasted live on Fuji Television's New Years countdown, Johnny's Countdown Live 2011 - 2012.

== Track listing ==
Disc 1
No.	Title	Lyrics	Music	Arranged	Length
1.	"Monjai Beat" (モンじゃい・ビート Monjai Bīto "Coach Beat")	Naozumi Masako (Douhatsuten)	Tomoyasu Kamiharako (Douhatsuten)	Yoshimasa Fujisawa	4:59
2.	"Uchū ni Itta Lion" (宇宙に行ったライオン Uchū ni Itta Raion "The Lion that Went to Space")	Fujimori Shinichi (Aobouzu)	S. Fujimori/Keisuke Noma		4:38
3.	"Fight for the Eight"	Hiroaki Hayama	H. Hayama	H. Hayama/Brass Arrangement: YOKAN	4:07
4.	"T.W.L"	Yujin Kitagawa (Yuzu)	Y. Kitagawa	K. Noma/Brass Arrangement: YOKAN	4:16
5.	"Fly High"	Taisuke Yamamori (ROCK'A'TRENCH)	T. Yamamori	Shōgo Onishi/ROCK'A'TRENCH	3:54
6.	"365 Nichi Kazoku" (365日家族 "365 Day Family")	Hanano Tanaka	Naohisa Taniguchi	S. Onishi	5:42
7.	"Dye D?"	Shota Yasuda	S. Yasuda	Sean Gold	3:04
8.	"Water Drop"	UNIST	Kiyo Tsurumi/Joey Carbone	Yasutaka Kume/Brass Arrangement: YOKAN
9.	"Tsubusa ni Koi" (ツブサニコイ "Love Again and Again")	TAKESHI	Face 2 Fake	Face 2 Fake	4:56
10.	"Yellow Pansy Street" (イエローパンジーストリート Ierō Panjī Sutorīto)	TAKESHI	Y. Kume	TAKESHI/Y. Kume/Brass Arrangement: YOKAN	4:54
11.	"Freedom Rion" (フリーダム理論 Furīdamu Rion "Freedom Theory")	Sukimaswitch	Y. Kume	Brass Arrangement: YOKAN	4:18
12.	"Kagayakeru Butai e" (輝ける舞台へ Kagayakeru Butai e "To the Sparkling Stage")	Ryo Tanaka	Kenta Kawano/YANAGIMAN	DJ KOHNO/YANAGIMAN	4:06
13.	"My Home" (マイホーム Mai Hōmu)	A.F.R.O	A.F.R.O	K. Noma	4:32
14.	"wander"	Kusuo	Kusuo	Y. Kume

Disc 2 (Standard release only)
No.	Title	Lyrics	Music	Artist	Length
1.	"Scarecrow" (スケアクロウ Sukeakurō)	R. Nishikido	R. Nishikido	Ryo Nishikido
2.	"Yoru na Yoru na ☆ Yō NIGHT" (夜な夜な☆ヨーNIGHT Yona Yona ☆ Yō NIGHT "Night after Night ☆ YOO NIGHT")	S. Murakami/S. Yasuda/T. Ohkura	S. Yasuda	Shota Yasuda, Shingo Murakami, and Tadayoshi Okura
3.	"Pan Panda" (パンぱんだ)	AMO	Tanaka Hidenori	Ryuhei Maruyama & You Yokoyama
4.	"A" (あ)	S. Shibutani	S. Shibutani	Subaru Shibutani	5:02

== Charts ==
=== Weekly charts ===
Chart (2011)	Peak position
Oricon	1
Billboard Japan	1

=== Year-end charts ===
Chart (2011)	Position
Oricon Yearly Ranking	21
Billboard Japan Year End	23

=== Singles ===
Year	Single	Peak chart positions			Certifications
Year	Single	Oricon Weekly	Billboard Japan Weekly	Oricon Monthly	Certifications
2011	"T.W.L/Yellow Pansy Street"	1	1	—	Platinum
2011	"My Home"	1	1	—	Gold
2011	"365 Nichi Kazoku"	1	1	—	Gold
2011	"Tsubusa ni Koi"	1	1	4	Gold
"—" denotes releases that did not chart or was not released.
