= List of Hot 100 number-one singles of 2012 (Japan) =

This is a list of number one singles on the Billboard Japan Hot 100 chart in Japan in 2012. The week's most songs in Japan, ranked by the Hanshin Corporation and based on radio airplay measured by Plantech and sales data as compiled by SoundScan Japan.

== Chart history ==
Date	Song	Artist	Reference
January 2	"Boku no Hanbun"	SMAP	
January 16	"Wonderful Cupid/Glass no Mahou"	NYC	
January 23	"Kawatta Katachi no Ishi"	KinKi Kids	
January 30	"Good Luck"	Bump of Chicken	
February 6	"Kataomoi Finally"	SKE48	
February 13	"Hitotsu"	Tsuyoshi Nagabuchi	
February 20	"Junjō U-19"	NMB48	
February 27	"Give Me Five!"	AKB48	
March 5	"Super Delicate"	Hey! Say! JUMP	
March 12	"I, Texas"	Tomohisa Yamashita	
March 19	"Wild at Heart"	Arashi	
March 26	"Still"	TVXQ	
April 2	"She! Her! Her!"	Kis-My-Ft2	
April 9	"Ikiteru Ikiteku"	Masaharu Fukuyama	
April 16	"Go for It, Baby (Kioku no Sanmyaku)"	B'z	
April 23	"Spring of Life"	Perfume	
April 30	"Inori (Namida no Kidō)"	Mr. Children	
May 7	"Sakasama no Sora"	SMAP	
May 14	"Soredemo Suki Da yo"	Rino Sashihara	
May 21	"Face Down"	Arashi	
May 28	"Aishite-love-ru!"	SKE48	
June 4	"Manatsu no Sounds Good!"	AKB48	
June 11	"Manatsu no Sounds Good!"	AKB48	
June 18	"Your Eyes"	Arashi	
June 25	"Ai Deshita."	Kanjani Eight	
July 2	"Kimi wa Boku Da"	Atsuko Maeda	
July 9	"Paparazzi"	Girls' Generation	
July 16	"Love Chase"	Tomohisa Yamashita	
July 23	"Love Love Summer"	Ketsumeishi	
July 30	"Chankapāna"	NEWS	
August 6	"ER"	Eight Ranger	
August 13	"Moment"	SMAP	
August 20	"Virginity"	NMB48	
August 27	"Wanna Beeee!!!"	Kis-My-Ft2	
September 3	"Hashire! Bicycle"	Nogizaka46	
September 10	"Gingham Check"	AKB48	
September 17	"Aoppana"	Kanjani Eight	
September 24	"Fumetsu no Scrum"	KAT-TUN	
October 1	"Kiss Datte Hidarikiki"	SKE48	
October 8	"Oh!"	Girls' Generation	
October 15	"Sexy Summer ni Yuki ga Furu"	Sexy Zone	
October 22	"Beautiful Life"	Masaharu Fukuyama	
October 29	"Electric Boy"	Kara	
November 5	"Life Is Show Time"	Shō Kiryūin from Golden Bomber	
November 12	"Uza"	AKB48	
November 19	"Kitagawa Kenji"	NMB48	
November 26	"Ai no Beat"	Kis-My-Ft2	
December 3	"Saraba, Itoshiki Kanashimitachi yo"	Momoiro Clover Z	
December 10	"Monsters"	The Monsters	
December 17	"Eien Pressure"	AKB48	
December 24	"World Quest"	NEWS	
December 31	"Seifuku no Mannequin"	Nogizaka46	
