= List of Oricon number-one singles of 2012 =

The highest-selling singles in Japan are ranked in the Oricon Weekly Chart, which is published by Oricon Style magazine. The data are compiled by Oricon based on each singles' weekly physical sales.

== Chart history ==
Issue Date	Singles	Artist(s)	Reference(s)
January 2	"Boku no Hanbun" (僕の半分, Half of Me)	SMAP	
January 9	"Seasons"	Jin Akanishi	
January 16	"Wonderful Cupid/Garasu no Mahō" (ワンダフル キューピット/がらすの・魔法・, Wandafuru Kyūpitto, Garasu no Mahō) "Wonderful Cupid/Magic of Glass"	NYC/Yuma Nakayama	
January 23	"Kawatta Katachi no Ishi" (変わったかたちの石, "Stone of Strange Form")	KinKi Kids	
January 30	"Good Luck"	Bump of Chicken	
February 6	"Kataomoi Finally"	SKE48	
February 13	"Where You Are"	CN Blue	
February 20	"Junjō U-19"	NMB48	
February 27	"Give Me Five!"	AKB48	
March 5	"SUPER DELICATE"	Hey! Say! JUMP	
March 12	"Ai, Texas" (愛、テキサス, Ai, Tekisasu, "Love, Texas")	Tomohisa Yamashita	
March 19	"Wild at Heart"	Arashi	
March 26	"Still"	TVXQ	
April 2	"She! Her! Her!"	Kis-My-Ft2	
April 9	"Ikiteru Ikiteku" (生きてる生きてく, "Alive, To Live")	Masaharu Fukuyama	
April 16	"Go for It, Baby (Kioku no Sanmyaku)"	B'z	
April 23	"Lady Diamond" (Lady ダイヤモンド, Redi Daiyamondo)	Sexy Zone	
April 30	"Inori (Namida no Kidō) / End of the Day/Pieces" (祈り 〜涙の軌道/End of the day/pieces, "Prayer (Tear's Orbit)/ End of the day/pieces")	Mr. Children	
May 7	"Sakasama no Sora" (さかさまの空, "Upside-down Sky")	SMAP	
May 14	"Oide Shampoo"	Nogizaka46	
May 21	"Face Down"	Arashi	
May 28	"Aishite-love-ru!"	SKE48	
June 4	"Manatsu no Sounds Good!"	AKB48	
June 11	"Suika Baby"	Not Yet	
June 18	"Your Eyes"	Arashi	
June 25	"Ai Deshita."	Kanjani Eight	
July 2	"All Night Long"	Exile	
July 9	"To the Limit"	KAT-TUN	
July 16	"Heat"	Kim Hyun-joong	
July 23	"Android"	TVXQ	
July 30	"Chankapāna"	NEWS	
August 6	"ER"	Eight Ranger	
August 13	"Moment"	SMAP	
August 20	"Virginity"	NMB48	
August 27	"Wanna Beeee!!!/Shake It Up"	Kis-My-Ft2	
September 3	"Hashire! Bicycle"	Nogizaka46	
September 10	"Gingham Check"	AKB48	
September 17	"Aoppana" (あおっぱな, "Green Snot")	Kanjani Eight	
September 24	"Fumetsu no Scrum"	KAT-TUN	
October 1	"Kiss Datte Hidarikiki"	SKE48	
October 8	"Oh!"	Girls' Generation	
October 15	"Sexy Summer ni Yuki ga Furu" (Sexy Summerに雪が降る, "It Snows in Sexy Summer")	Sexy Zone	
October 22	"Beautiful Life/Game"	Masaharu Fukuyama	
October 29	"Ikujinashi Masquerade"	Rino Sashihara with Anrire	
November 5	"Go to the top"	Koda Kumi	
November 12	"Uza"	AKB48	
November 19	"Kitagawa Kenji"	NMB48	
November 26	"Ai no Beat" (アイノビート, "Love's Beat")	Kis-My-Ft2	
December 3	"Hikaru Monotachi"	Mayu Watanabe	
December 10	"Monsters"	The Monsters	
December 17	"Eien Pressure"	AKB48	
December 24	"World Quest/Pokopon Pekōrya"	NEWS	
December 31	"Seifuku no Mannequin"	Nogizaka46	

== See also ==
- 2012 in music
