= Wonderful World!! =

- Limited Edition A

Single by Kanjani8

from the album 8uppers
- Released: June 30, 2010
- Genre: J-pop
- Label: Imperial Records

Kanjani8 singles chronology
"Gift ~White~" (2009)	"Wonderful World!!" (2010)	"Life (Me no Mae no Mukou e)" (2010)

Limited Editions

"Wonderful World!!" is a single release by the Japanese boyband Kanjani8. The song was written and composed by ROADIE with music arranged by Yasutaka Kume. It is accompanied by the B-side titled, " Ukiyo Odoribito " which was written and composed by TAKESHI. This single release was the band's first release for 2010 and their 14th single release overall. The single was released by Imperial Records as the second single release for their fourth album, 8 Uppers. The single also served as the introduction to the 8 Uppers story, the movie that also came with the album's release.

"Wonderful World!!" is a generic pop song that has ska and hip hop influences. The song relies heavily upon horns, synthesizers, guitars, and drums. The lyrics are generally positive, singing about love and happiness in a wonderful world.

The song was a commercial success, topping the Oricon charts upon its release. The music video for the song's release had the band working in an auto repair shop, repairing an old Volkswagen Type 2 for a female customer that they've all fallen in love with. The song was performed several times on television and was also performed at their Kanjani Eight Live Tour 2010-2011 8 Uppers concert tour.

== Background ==
"Wonderful World!!" was written and composed by ROADIE with music arranged by Yasutaka Kume. Some of the members remarked on the song's composition, describing it as a happy, upbeat song. Yuu Yokoyama commented that the song was a, " Fun type of song to perform live with. " The song was mixed by Oshima Yuji.

== Composition ==
"Wonderful World!!"
A 28-second sample of the song shows transition from verse to chorus, highlighting the change from hip-hop to pop

"Wonderful World!!" is a standard pop song that uses a lot of horns and funky synthesized beats. The song's main verses are rapped against the fast beats. Then during the hook and chorus, the song slows down, and lyrics are sung against a horn-heavy background. During the verses, the members of Kanjani Eight can be heard rambling in the background by either laughing, talking, verbally fighting, or responding to the lyrics of the song. After the instrumental break, Ryo Nishikido sings the chorus as a solo, with only a keyboard playing chords faintly in the background. In the second half of the break, Shota Yasuda joins him in a higher octave as a harmony. The song then ends with Subaru Shibutani singing an improved solo, with half the group singing " La, la, la " and the other half repeating the hook as support till the end.

The lyrics for "Wonderful World!!" are about enjoying time with someone that you love and forgetting the bad. The band sings, " I've only been searching for miracles / And now the day's already over / Now we swear here / That things like our hearts being separated will never happen " during the first verse, bringing forth the optimism of the band's outlook on love and life. This is tied in full circle with the chorus, " Suddenly our hands are together / Hey, look at that / They're fusing / We'll forever hope / That our laughter / will always be there every day ". The lyrics are also sprinkled with English words thrown into the lyrics.

The coupling B-side, " Ukiyo Odoribito ", takes on a totally different sound and mood compared to the A-side, " Wonderful World ". It's more mature in sound, slightly slower, and darker. The song is written with a big band influence with a scat-inspired hook. The song takes advantage of Kanjani Eight's harmony and uses it to its fullest. Shibutani and Nishikido opens up the song with solo verses against a swing drumbeat and a guitar riff. Tadayoshi Ohkura, Ryuhei Maruyama, and Yasuda then take the song into the chorus with duets. The whole band comes in for the chorus before the scat-inspired hook that is sung by Maruyama, Ohkura, Yokoyama, and Shibutani. Yokoyama and Shota duet in the second verse, with Maruyama and Murakami carrying into the second phrase of the second verse. Shibutani and Ohkura duet the bridge and Nishikido sings a solo into the second chorus before the instrumental break. Shibutani comes in after with a solo against an electric bass and a high-hat tap. The chorus continues till the end, which then the song closes with the hook.

The lyrics for "Ukiyo Odoribito" are more maturer and darker in contrast to "Wonderful World!!". The song is about a woman that tricks a man with her lies and yet they are unable to leave her, " Oh, baby / You're dancing in a sad world / So why am I unable to hate your lies? / A dry wind blows through my heart / A painful pattern of love " they sing in the chorus. The lyrics continue to tell of this person's inability to break free until they find themselves caught up in the same situation, " I find in an opposite mirror / A silhouette that resembles me / A person dancing in the light rain ".

== Music video ==
A scene from the Wonderful World!! music video that shows when the band finds out the object of their attraction already has a boyfriend.

The music video for Wonderful World!! opens up with a woman getting out of her broken Volkswagen Type 2. She inspects the car to confirm that it is broken and in need of repair. The scene changes to Kanjani Eight singing in fluorescent colored flower print outfits to the opening of the song, goofing off and playing around with everything in an auto shop. The scene then changes to each of the members rapping against a green screen that is animated with the lyrics of the song with the other members goofing off in the background. The video returns to the woman arriving at the auto shop, revealed to be named " Wonderful World ", bringing in her broken van in for repair. We then find out that the band are actually repairmen at this auto shop and they instantly fall in love with her.

Scenes of the band singing along to the song in the floral-print outfits interspersed the story in the video, which shows the band falling more in more in love with the woman. The video ends with the band giving her back her repaired car and presenting her with various gifts of their love. They then find out that she has a boyfriend and are left rejected. They dejectedly watch as she drives off with her boyfriend.

The final moment of the video is of the easter egg provided in the Regular Edition of the single's release. A bohemian, played by Shingo Murakami and inspired by one of his characters from his solo stage play, is playing his guitar while the song plays on a radio faintly in the background.

=== Release and development ===
The music video was released with the Limited Edition A version of the single and only included the music video. It was also aired on SpaceShowerTV and m-on. A short version of the music video was also aired on the latter. The music video was directed by Takuya Tada and filmed on May 21, 2011. Production ended in June 2010. Takeki Kitajima directed CG scenes in the video.

According to set designers, NARRA DESIGN, the team received a request to create a "poppy garage" and so they decorated a studio to resemble the request. The request had explained that the group was no longer riding the 'comedian' image and were rather shifting to a more 'cool' image. Thus, it was requested that creating a bubblegum pop look was no good and instead wanted to go with a more manly, sweaty, oily feel. NARRA DESIGN then spent time going over props, from size to colors, to fit the right image requested by production team. They also mention the endless number of times it took to get the right font and size for the 'Wonderful World' sign board that hung in the garage.

== Chart performance ==
Wonderful World debuted at number one on the Oricon Daily Singles chart with a total of 101,088 units sold. In its second say of sales, it continued its strong trend on the charts selling an additional 81,725 units and maintaining its number one position. Over the remainder of the week, "Wonderful World's" sales steadily dropped but earned the number one position for the week ending July 4, 2010 with 245,064 units sold.

For the 2010 year, "Wonderful World!!" was the 18th most sold single with a total of 275,891 units sold. It was certified platinum by the Recording Industry Association of Japan for having 250,000 units sold.

== Promotion ==
The song was performed on Fuji Television's Hey!Hey!Hey! Music Champ on June 28, 2010. It was also performed on the Shounen Club Premium's June 18, 2010 episode. The song was also used as the ending theme to their variety show on TV Asahi titled Bōken Japan! Kanjani8 Map.

=== Cross promotion for 8 Uppers ===
"Wonderful World" is the first release that introduces the "8 Uppers" storyline to the public. The regular edition CD cover displays each member displaying their character's trademark characteristics, such as Shibutani sitting on top of the Volkswagen Type 2 pointing a gun Murakami holding a pot, alluding to his weapon which is a butterfly knife converted into a fork. Maruyama is balancing a broom stick, which he uses in the movie as an impromptu weapon. Yasuda is playing a video game and Ohkura is checking himself in the van's mirror.

The van used in the music video and CD covers is also the van that the characters use in the movie.

The Limited Edition B version of the "Wonderful World!!" single release contains the first four chapters of the Prologue of Pachi series of character introductions for the movie. The first chapter introduces all of the characters to the song, " Ukiyo Odoribito ", which is also the B-side on this single. Chapters 3 - 4 introduce Nishikido's character, Ace, Maruyama's character, Gum, and Shibutani's character, Arsenal. The songs used in chapters 3 - 4 were also used on the solo disc of the regular edition of 8 Uppers.

== Charts ==
Day/Week	Oricon Chart	Peak position	Sales total
Day 1	Oricon Daily Ranking	1	101,088
Week 1	Oricon Weekly Ranking	1	245,064
Year	Oricon Year Ranking	18	275,891

== Track listing ==
=== Regular Edition ===
1. "Wonderful World!!"
2. "Ukiyo Odoribito" (浮世踊リビト; The Sad World Dance Beat)
3. "Wahaha!! "Puzzle" Remix"
4. "Rolling Coaster "Puzzle" Remix"
5. "Wonderful World!!"
6. "Ukiyo Odoribito" (浮世踊リビト; The Sad World Dance Beat)

=== Limited Editions ===
==== A ====
1. "Wonderful World!!"
2. "Ukiyo Odoribito" (浮世踊リビト; The Sad World Dance Beat)

===== DVD =====
1. "Wonderful World" Music Clip and Making

==== B ====
1. "Wonderful World!!"
2. "Ukiyo Odoribito" (浮世踊リビト; The Sad World Dance Beat)

===== DVD =====
1. "The Prologue of Pachi" #1 ~ 4
