= Life (Me no Mae no Mukō e) =

- Limited Edition B

Single by Kanjani8

from the album 8uppers
- Released: August 25, 2010
- Genre: Rock
- Label: Imperial Records
- Songwriter: Kanamaru Yoshifumi

Kanjani8 singles chronology
"Wonderful World!!" (2010)	"Life (Me no Mae no Mukō e)" (2010)	"T.W.L/Yellow Pansy Street" (2011)

Limited Editions

"Life (Me no Mae no Mukō e)" is a single release by the Japanese boyband Kanjani8. The song was written and composed by Kanamaru Yoshifumi and arranged by Onishi Shogo. It is accompanied with the B-side, " Aoshashin ", written, composed, and arranged by Hayama Hiroaki. This is their second release for the year 2010 and their 15th single overall. The single was released by Imperial Records as the third single release for their fourth album, 8 Uppers. The single served as the conclusion to the 8 Uppers story introduction, the movie that also came with the album's release. It was also used as the theme song for the Tokyo Broadcast Systems drama, GM: General Medicine ~Odore Doctor~.

"Life" is a powerful pop-rock song which carried by a string section. The song utilizes all sorts of instruments such as rhythm percussion, a keyboard, drums, guitars, and an electric bass. Teichiku Records describes the song to be a, "Rock number all about not stopping, going forward, and sprinting forward with that outlook on the world ". The lyrics are encouraging, with a message about going forward without stopping and obtaining your dreams.

The single was a commercial success upon release, topping the Oricon charts. The music video consisted of the band playing in an abandoned, damp, hangar. The song was performed on several television programs as at their Kanjani Eight Live Tour 2010-2011 8 Uppers concert tour.

== Background and Development ==
"Life" was written and composed by Kanamaru Yoshifumi and arranged by Onishi Shogo. The song was used for the television drama, GM: General Medicine ~Odore Doctor~. The song was well received by the band, member Tadayoshi Ohkura had mentioned that in a conversation with Ryo Nishikido, Nishikdio had said, " This is a good song ". Shota Yasuda remarked with, "Kanjani8 has not performed this type of song like this before, but we're still able to do such a thing, and I'm happy that everyone will be able to see this face of ours! "

The song title was undecided until the actual filming of the music video. There was a list of titles and Nishikido thought of additional titles such as "Pallette," "Mada Mada," "Me no Mae no Mukō e" and "Infinity." The group then voted on these names, with "Me no Mae no Mukō e" getting three votes from Shibutani, Maruyama and Murakami. Yasuda and Nishikdo voted for "Infinity," but changed their vote to "Life" when it was suggested. Ohkura and Yokoyama also voted for "Life." Maruyama gave another vote to "Kagiyaki Traveler." Yokoyama and Hina gave another vote to "Pallette." Nishikido then tallied the votes and "Life" came in first with "Me no Mae no Mukō e" in second. Ohkura suggested to combine the two and the band agreed for the song's title to be, "Life (Me no Mae no Mukō e)."

The song was mixed by Manabu Yokota of MIXER'S LAB.

== Composition ==
"Life (Me no Mae no Mukō e)"
A 28-second sample of the song displaying how the verses are split between the two groups

"Life" is a fast-paced pop-rock song. It uses various instruments such as rhythm percussion, drums, guitars, a keyboard, and an electric bass. A string section also has a predominant part in the song's chorus, which is harmonized with an electric guitar during the chorus. For majority of the song, the verses are split into harmonies between Subaru Shibutani, Ryuhei Maruyama, and Shota Yasuda covering one section and Ryo Nishikido, Yuu Yokoyama, and Shingo Murakami in another. Ohkura has one solo, the bridge, which is accompanied only with strings. Shibutani and Nishikido open up the song, alternating between each other with " Absolutely / Absolutely ", before singing " I want to continue walking forward / without looking back " and ending with a falsetto, " Because it's still / Not over yet ".

Lyrically, "Life" talks about going forward with all one's might because of the courage someone has given them. The band sings in the chorus, " Today I've cried/ I've cried / " Some day I'm going to smile again " / Look up at the sky / Open my hands / And prepare myself for tomorrow / Then once more / Once more / I want to laugh with the smile you gave me / Because it's still / Not over yet ", bringing the message of the song full circle. The appreciation that the band has for the person is also known, " I want to continue walking forward / without looking back / because I am not alone. "

== Music video ==
The opening scene from the Life music video. Take notice of the saturated blacks.

The music video for "Life" takes place in a hangar. The band is performing in the hangar with their instruments, hooked up to various sound amps. Surrounding them are crate, boxes, fans, fences, and various lighting. The video is dark and gritty with strong contrast and saturation. Sharp, shaking, camera filming techniques are used; with fast zooms and cuts on each member. In the second half of the video, the band scenes are interspersed with scenes of the member's lying, wet, in a black room.

=== Development and Release ===
The shooting for "Life" took an entire day and was filmed on location. Set design was done by NARRA DESIGN, who also did the set design for Wonderful World!! Promotional material used for the CD jacket design and other materials was also taken on this day and on location at the Kaiyoukai Yokohama Shibu. The video was directed by Tetsuo Inoue and produced by Yoshiyuki Takahashi.

According to set designers, NARRA DESIGN, the team needed to find a location that "resembled an aircraft hangar" and was big enough to facilitate a crane. They had considered a concert hall, but it did not give the look and feel that they needed. A concert hall would be too large for what they were going for. They went to Aero Tech for research on what an aircraft hangar looked like and managed to find a location. Set props were provided by Daifuku Plus More, Tuff Gong, and Tokyo Aviation Vocational School. There were also worries that the video ended up resembling the look of TOKIO's "Advance" music video.

Filming was split between the "band scene" and an "image scene". The band scenes were filmed in the first half of the day and the image scenes were filmed later in the afternoon. For the image scenes, the band members were soaked in water. Production for the video ended in July 2010.

The music video was released on DVD and coupled with the Limited Edition version A. The music video also premiered on SpaceShowerTV and m-on.

== Chart performance ==
Life debuted at number one for the Oricon Daily Single Charts with a total of 124,153 units sold. By its sixth day on the charts, the single had maintained its number one position on the charts and sold an additional 13,157 units. For the end week of August 23, 2010, Life had sold a total of 256,245 units earning the number spot on the Oricon Weekly Singles chart.

For the end year of 2010, Life was the 15th most sold single of the year with a total of 305,478 units sold. The single was later certified platinum by the Recording Industry of Japan.

== Promotion ==
Kanjani Eight has performed "Life" on several occasions. Upon the single's release, they performed it on the August 27th, 2010 episode of Music Station. They also performed the song at Music Station's 2010 Super Live for that year. In 2011, they performed the song again on Music Lovers along with "Monjai Beat" from their fifth album, Fight.

=== Cross Promotion for 8 Uppers ===
Because of the song's association with GM: General Medicine ~Odore Doctor~, the single's packaging did not use any cross promotion for the 8 Uppers movie that came with the album of the same name. Instead, the Limited Edition B featured a DVD titled, Prologue of Pachi #5 ~ 8, that concluded the introduction of the movie. It contained the final four chapters of the story and a trailer for the movie itself as well as the reveal of the movie's interactive website, club eight. The final three chapters introduced Yokoyama's character, Mac, Ohkura's character, Johnny, Murakami's character, Jacky, and finally Yasuda's character, Toppo. Ohkura's story ties all the previous chapters together when his character reunites with all the other characters at the end of the video.

== Charts ==
Day/Week	Oricon Chart	Peak Position	Sales Total
Day 1	Oricon Daily Ranking	1	124,153
Week 1	Oricon Weekly Ranking	1	256,245
Year	Oricon Year Ranking	15	305,478

== Track listing ==
=== Regular Edition ===
1. "Life (Me no Mae no Mukō e)" (LIFE ~目の前の向こうへ~; LIFE ~Far Beyond Our Eyes~)
2. "Aoshashin" (蒼写真; Blue Photograph)
3. "Jackhammer"
4. Kyū Jō Show!! Countdown Remix (急☆上☆Show!! Countdown Remix; "Suddenly Rising Show!! Countdown Remix")
5. "Life (Me no Mae no Mukō e)" (LIFE ~目の前の向こうへ~; LIFE ~Far Beyond Our Eyes~) Original Karaoke
6. "Aoshashin" (蒼写真; Blue Photograph) Original Karaoke
7. "Jackhammer" Original Karaoke

=== Limited Editions ===
==== A ====
1. "Life (Me no Mae no Mukō e)" (LIFE ~目の前の向こうへ~; LIFE ~Far Beyond Our Eyes~)
2. "Aoshashin" (蒼写真; Blue Photograph)

===== DVD =====
1. "Life (Me no Mae no Mukō e)" Music Clip and Making

==== B ====
1. "Life (Me no Mae no Mukō e)" (LIFE ~目の前の向こうへ~; LIFE ~Far Beyond Our Eyes~)
2. "Aoshashin" (蒼写真; Blue Photograph)

===== DVD =====
1. "The Prologue of Pachi" #5 ~ 8
