= Zukkoke Otoko Michi =

- Regular Edition Cover

Single by Kanjani8

from the album KJ2 Zukkoke Dai Dassō
- Released: April 11, 2007
- Genre: Pop
- Length: 17:43
- Label: Imperial Records

Kanjani8 singles chronology
"Kan Fu Fighting" (2006)	"Zukkoke Otoko Michi" (2007)	"It's My Soul" (2007)

"Zukkoke Otoko Michi" (ズッコケ男道; lit. "Misguided Mans Way") is the sixth single released by the Japanese boyband Kanjani8. This single marked the change of labels from Teichiku Records to Imperial Records because the group's sound had changed from Enka to Pop. "Zukkoke Otoko Michi" was of the disco/pop variety and was unsuited for the previous label.

== Track listing ==
=== Regular Edition ===
1. " Zukkoke Otoko Michi "
2. " Ai ni Mukatte "
3. " Explosion "
4. " Zukkoke Otoko Michi <Original Karaoke> "

=== Limited Edition ===
1. " Zukkoke Otoko Michi "
2. " Ai ni Mukatte "
3. " Zukkoke Otoko Michi <Original Karaoke> "

== Charts ==
Week	Oricon Weekly	Peak Position	Sales Total
April 17, 2007	April Week 3	1	190,700
June 18, 2006	May Week 1	15	6500
N/A	N/A	Fell off the top 30	N/A
