= Sukiyanen, Osaka/Oh! Enka/Mugendai =

"Sukiyanen, Osaka/Sakura Enka (Oh!Enka)/Mugendai"
- CD Version A Cover

Single by Kanjani8

from the album KJ1 F.T.O
- Released: September 14, 2005
- Genre: Pop/Enka
- Length: 16:08
- Label: Teichiku Records

Kanjani8 singles chronology
"Osaka Rainy Blues" (2005)	"Sukiyanen, Osaka/Sakura Enka (Oh!Enka)/Mugendai" (2005)	"Osaka Obachan Rock/Osaka Romanesque" (2006)

"Sukiyanen, Osaka/Oh! Enka/Mugendai" (好きやねん、大阪。/桜援歌(Oh!ENKA)/無限大, Sukiyanen, Ōsaka./Ōenka/Mugendai) is the third single released by the Japanese boyband Kanjani Eight. The single was a triple A side release, featuring two versions of the CD single (a limited and standard release) which contained two different comedy sketches for the song "Sukiyanen, Osaka". The song "Mugendai" was the theme song to the Japanese theatrical release of the movie Robots.

== Track listing ==
=== Regular Edition ===
1. " Sukiyanen Osaka "
2. " Oh! Enka "
3. " Mugendai "
4. " Oh! Enka" <Original Karaoke>

=== Limited Edition ===
1. " Sukiyanen Osaka "
2. " Oh! Enka "
3. " Mugendai "
4. " Sukiyanen Osaka <Original Karaoke> "

== Charts ==
Chart (2005)	Peak position
Oricon Weekly	2
