= It's My Soul =

- Limited Edition Cover

Single by Kanjani8

from the album Puzzle
- Released: October 17, 2007
- Genre: Pop
- Length: 18:56
- Label: Imperial Records

Kanjani8 singles chronology
"Zukkoke Otoko Michi" (2006)	"It's My Soul" (2007)	"Wahaha" (2008)

"It's My Soul" (イッツ マイ ソウル, Ittsu Mai Sōru) is the seventh single released by the Japanese boyband Kanjani8. The song follows the same disco/funk trend that its predecessor and album featured. There were two versions of this single released, with the limited-edition single featuring a special double secret sticker.

This single also is the start of the members' alter-ego for each single's theme. Inside featured lead singer, Subaru Shibutani, in full drag portraying the girl that the song is about.

== Track listing ==
=== Regular Edition ===
1. " It's My Soul "
2. " Ano Kotoba ni "
3. " Yorimichi "
4. " It's My Soul <Original Karaoke> "

=== Limited Edition ===
1. " It's My Soul "
2. " Ano Kotoba ni "
3. " It's My Soul <Original Karaoke> "

== Charts ==
Week	Oricon Weekly	Peak Position	Sales Total
October 29, 2007	October Week 3	1	193,738
November 5, 2007	November Week 1	10	14,915
November 4, 2007	November Week 2	26	7,042
