= ER (song) =

Single by Kanjani Eight
- Released: May 25, 2012 (Japan)

Kanjani Eight singles chronology
"Ai Deshita" (2012)	"ER" (2012)	"Aoppana" (2012)

"ER" is a single by Japanese boy band Kanjani Eight as Eight Ranger. It was released on July 25, 2012. It debuted in number one on the weekly Oricon Singles Chart and reached number one on the Billboard Japan Hot 100.
