= Aoppana =

Single by Kanjani Eight
- Released: September 5, 2012 (Japan)

Kanjani Eight singles chronology
"ER" (2012)	"Aoppana" (2012)	"Hesomagari/Koko Ni Shikanai Keshiki" (2013)

"Aoppana" (あおっぱな) is a single by Japanese boy band Kanjani Eight. It was released on September 5, 2012. It debuted in number one on the weekly Oricon Singles Chart and reached number one on the Billboard Japan Hot 100.
