= Run for You =

"Run For You"

Single by KAT-TUN

from the album Chain
- B-side: Cosmic Child; Diamond; Sweet Chain; & Forever
- Released: August 3, 2011
- Recorded: 2011
- Genre: Pop rock
- Label: J-One Records
- Songwriter(s): Good Cop, Masumi Jones, Swe-Lo
- Producer(s): Johnny H. Kitagawa

KAT-TUN singles chronology
"White" (2011)	"Run For You" (2011)	"Birth" (2011)

"Run For You" is the sixteenth single by Japanese boy band KAT-TUN. The song "Run For You" is featured in a TV commercial for the Suzuki Solio, while "Cosmic Child" will be used in commercials for Wacoal products. "Diamond" will be used as the "image song" for "Dramatic Game 1844".

== Single information ==
Sixteenth single release from KAT-TUN. Regular Edition (First Press) includes tracks "Run For You", "Cosmic Child", "Diamond", and "& Forever" plus karaoke tracks of them. Different cover artworks are featured on three editions. Regular Edition includes tracks "Run For You", "Cosmic Child", "Diamond", and "Sweet Chain" plus karaoke tracks of them. Limited Edition includes a bonus DVD with a music video of the title song and its making-of. Different cover artworks are featured on three editions.

== Chart performance ==
In its first week of its release, the single topped the Oricon singles chart, reportedly selling 151,782 copies. KAT-TUN gained their Sixteenth consecutive number one single on the Oricon Weekly Singles Chart since their debut with all their singles sold more than 200,000 copies and continued to hold the most consecutive number one singles since debut with fellow Johnny's group, NEWS. The group debuted in March 2006 and since then, they have reached number one on the Oricon chart for every single they have released. Their 5 albums have also topped the charts one after another, setting a record a total of 21 singles and albums in first place. Run for You was reported by Oricon Monthly rankings to sell 174,076 copies.

By the end of the year, Run for You was reported by Oricon to sell 179,296 copies and was later certified Gold by RIAJ denoting over 100,000 shipments.

== Track listing ==
Regular Edition First Press
No.	Title	Lyrics	Music	Length
1.	"Run For You"	Sean-D	Good Cop, Swe-Lo, 18degrees.（Ken Arai）
2.	"Cosmic Child"	Sean-D, Joker	Oscar Holter, Jakke Erixson, John Hårleman, Shirose, Nikki, 18degrees.（Ken Arai）
3.	"Diamond"	Sean-D	King of slick, Daichi
4.	"& Forever"	Laika Leon	Shusui, King of slick, Yukihide “YT” Takiyama
5.	"Run For You" (Original Karaoke オリジナル・カラオケ)
6.	"Cosmic Child" (Original Karaoke オリジナル・カラオケ)
7.	"Diamond" (Original Karaoke オリジナル・カラオケ)
8.	"& Forever" (Original Karaoke オリジナル・カラオケ)

CD + DVD, Limited Edition
No.	Title	Lyrics	Music	Length
1.	"Run For You" (Video clip + Making clip ビデオ・クリップ＋メイキング)
2.	"Run For You"	Sean-D	Good Cop, Swe-Lo, 18degrees.（Ken Arai

Regular Edition
No.	Title	Lyrics	Music	Length
1.	"Run For You"	Sean-D	Good Cop, Swe-Lo, 18degrees.（Ken Arai
2.	"Cosmic Child"	Sean-D, Joker	Oscar Holter, Jakke Erixson, John Hårleman, Shirose, Nikki, 18degrees.（Ken Arai）
3.	"Diamond"	Sean-D	King of slick, Daichi
4.	"Sweet Chain"	miwa*, Joker	Daniel Sherman, Andy Gilbert
5.	"Run For You" (Original Karaoke オリジナル・カラオケ)
6.	"Cosmic Child" (Original Karaoke オリジナル・カラオケ)
7.	"Diamond" (Original Karaoke オリジナル・カラオケ)
8.	"Sweet Chain" (Original Karaoke オリジナル・カラオケ)

== Chart ==
Chart	Peak	Sales
Japan Oricon Weekly Chart	1	151,782
Japan Oricon Monthly Chart	3	174,076
Japan Oricon Yearly Chart	43	179,296
