= Osaka Obachan Rock/Osaka Romanesque =

- Cover

Single by Kanjani8

from the album KJ1 F.T.O KJ2 Zukkoke Dai Dassō
- Released: June 7, 2006
- Genre: Pop
- Length: 24:43
- Label: Teichiku Records

Kanjani8 singles chronology
"Sukiyanen, Osaka/Oh! Enka/Mugendai" (2005)	"Osaka Obachan Rock/Osaka Romanesque" (2006)	"Kan Fu Fighting" (2006)

"Osaka Obachan Rock/Osaka Romanesque" (∞SAKAおばちゃんROCK/大阪ロマネスク, Ōsaka Obachan Rokku/Ōsaka Romanesuku) is the fourth single released by the Japanese boyband Kanjani Eight. The double-A side single features two songs that are on two separate albums. Osaka Obachan Rock is featured on their second album, KJ2 Zukkoke Dai Dassō while Osaka Romanesque originally appeared on KJ1 F.T.O. The difference is that the single version has a 24-second lead.

The limited edition of the single came with a mini poster while the regular edition featured a seven-page booklet.

== Track listing ==
=== Regular Edition ===
1. " Osaka Obachan Rock "
2. " Osaka Romanesque "
3. " Kitto, Itsuka... "
4. " Osaka Obachan Rock <Original Karaoke> "
5. " Osaka Romanesque <Original Karaoke> "

=== Limited Edition ===
1. " Osaka Obachan Rock "
2. " Osaka Romanesque "
3. " Osaka Obachan Rock <Original Karaoke> "
4. " Osaka Romanesque <Original Karaoke> "

== Charts ==
Week	Oricon Weekly	Peak Position	Sales Total
June 11, 2006	June Week 3	2	170,257
June 18, 2006	June Week 4	15	13,022
June 25, 2006	July Week 1	29	5,284
