= Birth (KAT-TUN song) =

Single by KAT-TUN

from the album Chain
- B-side: Star Rider; Act On Emotion; Baby B Mine
- Released: November 30, 2011
- Recorded: 2011
- Genre: Pop rock
- Label: J-One
- Songwriters: Sean-D, Janne Hyöty, DAICHI, Paul Oxley, Billy Marx Jr
- Producer: Johnny H. Kitagawa

KAT-TUN singles chronology
"Run for You" (2011)	"Birth" (2011)	"To the Limit" (2012)

"Birth" is the seventeenth single by Japanese boy band KAT-TUN. The song "Birth" is the theme song for Kamenashi Kazuya's drama, 'Yokai Ningen Bem' ('Humanoid Monster Bem'). "Birth" became their 17th straight No.1 single on the Oricon's weekly chart since their debut, selling 193,584 copies within its first week of release.

== Single information ==
Seventeenth single release from KAT-TUN featuring the theme of TV series Yokai Ningen Bem starring Kazuya Kamenashi. Regular Edition includes "Star Rider", "Act On Emotion" and "Baby B Mine" plus their karaoke tracks. Limited Edition / Type A includes a bonus DVD featuring a music video of "BIRTH" and its making-of. Limited Edition /Type B includes a bonus DVD featuring a music video of the "Star Rider" and its making-of. Cover artworks of all three editions are different. "Birth" utilizes great aerial shots of the city. When combined with scenes of the members contemplating a small, mysterious cube, the video gives off the feel of an exciting urban adventure. "Star Rider", on the other hand, is a straightforward dance MV that focuses heavily on the group's choreography.

== Chart performance ==
In its first week of its release, the single topped the Oricon singles chart, reportedly selling 193,584 copies. KAT-TUN gained their seventeenth consecutive number one single on the Oricon Weekly Singles Chart since their debut with all their singles sold more than 200,000 copies and continued to hold the most consecutive number one singles since debut with fellow Johnny's group, NEWS. The group debuted in March 2006 and since then, they have reached number one on the Oricon chart for every single they have released. Their 5 albums have also topped the charts one after another, setting a record a total of 22 singles and albums in first place. 'Birth' is also KAT-TUN's highest selling single of 2011 upon the first week of release. KAT-TUN placed at No.8 in the second weeks, reportedly selling 16,287 copies and in the third weeks of its release the single placed at No.17, reportedly selling 5,956 copies.

By the end of the year, Birth was reported to selling 232,280 copies and was later certified Platinum by RIAJ denoting over 250,000 shipments.

== Track listing ==
Regular Edition
No.	Title	Lyrics	Music	Length
1.	"Birth"	Sean-D	Janne Hyöty, DAICHI, Paul Oxley, Billy Marx Jr	04:14
2.	"Star Rider"	ISHU, JOKER (rap part)	Stephan Elfgren	04:25
3.	"Act On Emotion"	JamMush, JOKER (rap part)	Carl Utbult, Oskar Persson	04:07
4.	"Baby B Mine"	miwa*	Jorge Mhondera, Paul Drew, Greig Watts, Pete Barringer, Hiroshi Okazaki	03:42
5.	"Birth" (Original Karaoke オリジナル・カラオケ)
6.	"Star Rider" (Original Karaoke オリジナル・カラオケ)
7.	"Act On Emotion" (Original Karaoke オリジナル・カラオケ)
8.	"Baby B Mine" (Original Karaoke オリジナル・カラオケ)

CD + DVD, Limited Edition / Type A
No.	Title	Lyrics	Music	Length
1.	"Birth"	Sean-D	Janne Hyoty, DAICHI, Paul Oxley, Billy Marx Jr
2.	"Birth (Video clip + Making clip ビデオ・クリップ＋メイキング + Special Documentary)"

CD + DVD, Limited Edition / Type B
No.	Title	Lyrics	Music	Length
1.	"Birth"	Sean-D	Janne Hyoty, DAICHI, Paul Oxley, Billy Marx Jr
2.	"Star Rider"	ISHU, JOKER (rap part)	Stephan Elfgren
3.	"Star Rider (Video clip)"

== Chart ==
Chart	Peak	Sales
Japan Oricon Weekly Chart	1	193,584
Japan Oricon Monthly Chart	3	223,095
Japan Oricon Yearly Chart	32	209,871
