= Crazy Ken Band =

Japanese band

- Genres: Funk, rock and roll, pop
- Years active: 1997–present
- Labels: Universal Sigma/Double Joy; 524; Substance; Almond Eyes
- Members: See members section
- Website: crazykenband.com universal-music.co.jp/CKB/

Crazy Ken Band (クレイジーケンバンド), also referred to as CKB, is a Japanese musical group formed in 1997 by its lead vocalist, writer and composer Ken Yokoyama. The band first came together in 1991 under the name "CK's", with a four-member lineup: Ken Yokoyama, Keiichi Hiroishi, Masao Onose and Shinya Horaguchi. This incarnation of the group was centred on a 15-man instrumental and vocal group. In 1997, Keiichi Nakanishi became the fifth member and the group's name was changed to "Crazy Ken Band".

== History ==
The band made its debut in June 1998 with the album Punch! Punch! Punch!. In 2000, support member Toraji Shingū became a full member of the band. The group's first single, "Nikutai Kankei", was released in June 2001. In 2003, HMV Japan ranked the band at #98 in their "Top 100 Japanese pops Artists". In 2005, their song "Tiger & Dragon" was used as the theme song of the critically acclaimed TBS drama of the same name.

The group's first compilation album, CKBB - Oldies But Goodies was released on March 3, 2004, reaching a chart position of #9 and remaining on the charts for forty-nine weeks. A set of compilation albums, Best Tsuru and Best Kame, their third and fourth compilation albums respectively, were released on February 24, 2010. Both were successful; Tsuru charted at #10 on the Oricon weekly chart, selling 13,323 copies in its first week, while Kame charted at #11, selling 12,158 copies in its first week.

"December 17" (12月17日) and "Kuroi Kizuato no Blues" (黒い傷跡のブルース), two songs from Galaxy, were featured in the 2006 video game Yakuza 2. "December 17" was later featured on Best Tsuru.

== Members ==
- Ken Yokoyama (横山 剣, Yokoyama Ken) - lead vocalist, chorus, writer, composer, arrangement and keyboardist
- Masao Onose (小野瀬 雅生, Onose Masao) - electric guitar and chorus
- Toraji Shingū (新宮 虎児, Shingū Toraji) - electric guitar and keyboard
- Keiichi Nakanishi (中西 圭一, Nakanishi Keiichi) - saxophone, flute
- Shinya Horaguchi (洞口 信也, Horaguchi Shinya) - bass
- Keiichi Hiroishi (廣石 恵一, Hiroishi Keiichi) - drums, percussion, bandmaster
- Toshimitsu Takahashi (高橋 利光, Takahashi Toshimitsu) - keyboard, arrangement
- Aiko Sugawara (菅原 愛子, Sugawara Aiko) - vocals, chorus
- Smokey Tetsuni (スモーキー・テツニ) - vocals, chorus
- Wakaba Kawai (河合 わかば, Kawai Wakaba) - trombone, flute
- Hironori Sawano (澤野 博敬, Sawano Hironori) - trumpet, flugelhorn
- Gen Date (伊達 弦, Date Gen) - percussion

== Discography ==
=== Singles ===
#	Title	Release date	Chart position
1	"Nikutai Kankei" (肉体関係, Sex Friend)	June 25, 2001	—
2	"September" (せぷてんばぁ)	September 10, 2001; Jusy 23, 2003 (re-release)	— 187 (re-release)
3	"Mappira Rock" (まっぴらロック)	May 22, 2002	98
4	"GT"	July 10, 2002	57
5	"Tiger & Dragon" (タイガー＆ドラゴン)	December 4, 2002; April 27, 2005 (re-release)	17
6	"Christmas Nante Daikirai!! Nanchatte" (クリスマスなんて大嫌い!! なんちゃって♥, I Hate Christmas! Only Joking♥)	December 4, 2002	14
7	"Amai Hibi/A, Yaru to kya Yaranakya Dame na no yo." (甘い日々／あ、やるときゃやらなきゃダメなのよ。)	February 19, 2003	24
8	"Abuku" (あぶく, Easy)	December 1, 2004	35
9	"Meri Meri (I Wanna Marry Marry You)" (メリメリ -I Wanna Marry Marry You-)	July 26, 2006	28
10	"Tenyawanya Desu yo" (てんやわんやですよ, Hectic!)	February 21, 2007	10
11	"Girlfriend" (ガールフレンド)	July 22, 2009	12
12	1107 (イイオンナ, Good Woman)	July 21, 2010	15
13	Ippai Ippai (いっぱい いっぱい, Full Full)	July 6, 2011	20
14	Wairudo de Ikou!!! (ワイルドで行こう！！！, Let's Go Wild!!!)	November 23, 2011	44
15	Furuyou Kurabu (不良倶楽部, Failure Club)	February 1, 2012	32

=== Studio albums ===
#	Title	Release date	Chart position
1	Punch! Punch! Punch!	June 25, 1998	—
2	Goldfish Bowl	May 10, 1999	—
3	Shock Ryōhō (ショック療法, Shock Therapy)	June 10, 2000	—
4	Gran Turismo (グランツーリズモ)	August 7, 2002	34
5	777	June 25, 2003	14
6	Brown Metallic	June 23, 2004	13
7	Soul Punch	July 6, 2005	9
8	Galaxy	September 20, 2006	10
9	Soul Denpa (SOUL電波, Soul Radio Waves)	August 8, 2007	6
10	Zero	August 13, 2008	5
11	Girls! Girls! Girls! (ガール!ガール!ガール!)	August 12, 2009	4
12	Mint Condition	August 10, 2010	9
13	Italian Garden	February 29, 2012	4
14	Flying Saucer	May 22, 2013	6
15	Spark Plug	September 3, 2014	9
16	Mousukkari Arenandayone (もうすっかりあれなんだよね)	August 12, 2015	3
17	Hong Kong Taxi	August 3, 2016	4
18	Pacific	August 7, 2019	11
19	Now	October 21, 2020	14
20	Jyuei (樹影)	August 3, 2022	9
21	Sekai (世界)	September 6, 2023	17
22	Mars (火星)	September 18, 2024	14
23	Karei (華麗)	September 3, 2025	16
24	Nani? (何?)	September 16, 2026	18

=== 12-inch albums ===
#	Title	Release date
1	Yokowake Handsome World (ヨコワケハンサムワールド)	1999
2	The Playboy's Manual	2000
3	MilkyWay Galaxy	2006

=== Digital albums ===
#	Title	Release date
1	iTunes Originals – Crazy Ken Band (Japan exclusive)	2005

=== Live albums ===
#	Title	Release date
1	Seizan 246 Shinyazoku no Yoru (青山246深夜族の夜)	December 10, 2000

=== Compilation albums ===
#	Title	Release date	Chart position
1	CKBB - Oldies But Goodies	March 3, 2004	9
2	Middle & Mellow of Crazy Ken Band	October 8, 2008	58
3	Crazy Ken Band: Best Tsuru (クレイジーケンバンド・ベスト 鶴, Crazy Ken Band: Best (Crane))	February 24, 2010	10
4	Crazy Ken Band: Best Kame (クレイジーケンバンド・ベスト 亀, Crazy Ken Band: Best (Turtle))	February 24, 2010	11
5	Single Collection / P-Vine Years	February 23, 2011	—
