= Ultimate Wheels =

2011 single by KAT-TUN

Single by KAT-TUN

from the album Chain
- B-side: Yoake Made; Make Or Break; Two
- Released: February 2, 2011
- Recorded: 2011
- Genre: Pop rock
- Label: J-One Records
- Songwriter(s): Laika Leon, Jane Doe, Andreas Johansson, Anderz Wrethov
- Producer(s): Johnny H. Kitagawa

KAT-TUN singles chronology
"Change Ur World" (2010)	"Ultimate Wheels" (2011)	"White" (2011)

"Ultimate Wheels" is the fourteenth single by Japanese boy band KAT-TUN. It was released on February 2, 2011 by their record label J-One Records. The single's release is to coincide with the release of a new series of television commercials starring all five members of the group.

== Single information ==
Fourteenth single release from KAT-TUN including songs "Ultimate Wheels" and "Two." This edition includes a bonus DVD with a music video of the title song and its making-of. Regular Edition (First Press) including songs "Ultimate Wheels," "Make Or Break," "Ultimate Wheels" (karaoke)," and "Make Or Break" (karaoke). Regular Edition including songs "Ultimate Wheels"," "Yoake Made," "Ultimate Wheels" (karaoke)," and "Yoake Made" (karaoke). Features alternate CD cover artwork.

== Chart performance ==
In its first week of its release, the single topped the Oricon singles chart, reportedly selling 181,494 copies. KAT-TUN gained their fourteenth consecutive number one single on the Oricon Weekly Singles Chart since their debut with all their singles sold more than 200,000 copies and continued to hold the second most consecutive number one singles since debut with fellow Johnny's group, NEWS.

By the end of the year, Ultimate Wheels was reported by Oricon to sell 210,749 copies and was later certified Platinum by RIAJ denoting over 250,000 shipments.

== Track listing ==
Regular Edition
No.	Title	Lyrics	Music	Length
1.	"Ultimate Wheels"	Laika Leon, Jane Doe	Andreas Johansson, Anderz Wrethov
2.	"Yoake Made (夜明けまで )"	miyakei, ECO, Joker	Makoto Inukai, King of slick
3.	"Ultimate Wheels" (Original Karaoke オリジナル・カラオケ)
4.	"Yoake Made (夜明けまで )" (Original Karaoke オリジナル・カラオケ)

CD + DVD, Limited Edition
No.	Title	Lyrics	Music	Length
1.	"Ultimate Wheels" (Video clip + Making clip ビデオ・クリップ＋メイキング)
2.	"Two"	miwa*	Shusui, Fredrik H, Carl U, Billy Marx Jr

Regular Edition (First Press)
No.	Title	Lyrics	Music	Length
1.	"Ultimate Wheels"	Laika Leon, Jane Doe	Andreas Johansson, Anderz Wrethov
2.	"Make Or Break"	Ayumi Miyazaki, Joker	Niklas Edberger
3.	"Ultimate Wheels" (Original Karaoke オリジナル・カラオケ)
4.	"Make Or Break" (Original Karaoke オリジナル・カラオケ)

== Chart ==
Chart	Peak	Sales
Japan Oricon Weekly Chart	1	181,494
Japan Oricon Monthly Chart	3	205,006
Japan Oricon Yearly Chart	31	210,749
