= Osaka Rainy Blues =

- Cover

Single by Kanjani8

from the album KJ1 F.T.O
- Released: March 2nd, 2005
- Genre: Pop/R&B
- Length: 12:03
- Label: Teichiku Records
- Composer(s): Kouji
- Lyricist(s): MASA

Kanjani8 singles chronology
"Naniwa Iroha Bushi" (2004)	"Osaka Rainy Blues" (2005)	"'Sukiyanen, Osaka/Oh! Enka/Mugendai'" (2006)

"Osaka Rainy Blues" (大阪レイニーブルース, Ōsaka Reinī Burūsu) is the second single released by the Japanese boyband Kanjani Eight. The single is the group's only single not to reach the top five on the Oricon and the poorest performing single sale wise. The single also marks the last official release that former member, Hiroki Uchi, participated in. The album version of the song had his vocal leads sung over by Ryo Nishikido.

== Track listing ==
1. " Osaka Rainy Blues "
2. " Heavenly Psycho "
3. " Osaka Rainy Blues " <Original Karaoke>

== Charts ==
Chart (2005)	Peak position
Oricon Weekly	4
