= T.W.L/Yellow Pansy Street =

- Regular Edition

Single by Kanjani8

from the album Fight
- Released: April 20, 2011
- Genre: J-pop
- Length: 18:18
- Label: Imperial Records

Kanjani8 singles chronology
"Life (Me no Mae no Mukou e)" (2010)	"T.W.L/Yellow Pansy Street" (2011)	"My Home" (2011)

Limited Editions
- Limited Edition B

A while back, at a bath house, when I entered the sauna I heard " Crayon Shin-chan " playing on the TV. The children were really singing along while watching but they totally did not notice that I was there. They knew the song but they probably didn't know about me. Though, watching that scene really made me happy.

— Yokoyama speaking about his favorite Kanjani Eight song of the moment.

"T.W.L/Yellow Pansy Street" is the double-A side single release by the Japanese boyband Kanjani8, the former written and composed by Yujin Kitagawa of Yuzu and the latter written and composed by Takeshi. This release marks their first single release for the year 2011 and their 16th single overall. The single was used as the theme song for the release of the 19th Crayon Shin-chan movie, Crayon Shin-chan: The Storm Called: Operation Golden Spy as well as the 14th theme song for the anime. The single was released by Imperial Records as the first release from their fifth album titled, Fight. As a double single, "T.W.L/Yellow Pansy Street" features two different styles of music, J-pop for T.W.L and rock for Yellow Pansy Street, and uses several different instruments in its overall composition such as horns, guitars, drums, keyboards and synthesizers. The lyrics for "T.W.L" focus on going forward without looking back while the lyrics for "Yellow Pansy Street" are about a man looking back on what could have been with his former lover.

The single was a commercial success, topping both the Oricon and Billboard Japan charts upon its release. The accompanied music videos with the single are separate from one another. The video for "T.W.L" portrays Kanjani Eight interacting with Shin-chan inspired caricatures of themselves while "Yellow Pansy Street" portrays Kanjani Eight playing as a band against a red, yellow and orange draped set dressed in Beatles-inspired outfits.

The song "T.W.L" was the primary song for this single release and thus was performed several times on television. Both songs off of this single were performed at their 2011 concert tour, Kanjani8: 5 Big Dome Tour Eight x Eighter: Sorry if it isn't Enjoyable Tour. You Yokoyama of Kanjani Eight has stated "T.W.L" to currently be a favorite of his out of the songs the band has performed thus far.

== Background ==
"T.W.L" was written by and composed by Yujin Kitagawa of Yuzu with music arranged by Keisuke Noma and brass arrangement by YOKAN. "Yellow Pansy Street" was written and composed by Takeshi with music arrangement also done by him, Yasutaka Kume and brass arrangement by YOKAN. "T.W.L" was written for Kanjani Eight to be used for the Shin-chan anime and upon news of hearing that Kitagawa had penned the song for them, there was a mutual excitement among the band. Tadayoshi Ohkura had said, "I really like the song, T.W.L, that was written by Yuzu's Kitagawa Yujin. [...] When I found out that Yuzu had wrote the song, I was extremely excited and yelled 'Oh!!!’ When I heard the demo tape, I had instantly liked the song". Shota Yasuda had said, "I don't know the meaning behind the title for T.W.L. I don't know the reason (behind it), hahaha! When I first heard the song, I was able to honestly get it. I understood the lyrics." He later stated on the DVD making that T.W.L stood for the word "towel". This could be confirmed by the fact that the animated version of band wave towels throughout the video for the song.

For "Yellow Pansy Street", drummer Ohkura had mentioned that, "the drum part was hard but in terms of the type of tempo" and that he was, " looking forward to performing it at this (year's) concert". Other members briefly commented that the song was a band-type of a song and Shingo Murakami commented with, "The song is very adult-like in sound, but type of scale it is still fits into the " Crayon Shin-chan " movie."

"T.W.L" and "Yellow Pansy Street" were recorded and mixed at LAB Recorders studios in Minato-ku, Tokyo, Japan. The songs were mixed by Manabu Yokota and DISC1.

== Composition ==
"Yellow Pansy Street"
A 25-second sample of the song features on half of the group singing the chorus, with the other half respond in a higher register

"T.W.L"
A 26-second sample of the song's chorus that features the bilingual puns frequently used in the song

"T.W.L" is a standard, upbeat, pop song. Its instrumentation uses a lot of synthesizers, horns, and guitars. The versus and hooks of the song are written with a heavy bass line with occasional funk slaps, a simple guitar riff, and a keyboard. The chorus then switches tempo and sound, with horns and synthesizers as the main support for the instrumental. For the bridge, the music is reduced to only an electric and acoustic guitar and as Subaru Shibutani sings the first two lines of the repeating chorus with an autotuned effect. The song then closes out with the chorus, with full instrumentation.

The lyrics for "T.W.L" are about going forward towards a goal without looking back. The chorus emphasizes this with, " Ok! Don't say 4... 5.../Just prepare yourself/Rush through that door/What's waiting for us there (We'll just go anyway)". The song also uses a lot of bilingual word puns and regular Japanese puns to bring double meaning to the song. "Hiraku to be love" when sung sounds like "Hiraku tobira" (Open the door) and "I? Ai? Ai ai..." (I? Love? All together...).

"Yellow Pansy Street" is a standard rock song with a slight 60s influence and heavy usage of horns. The song opens up with wind chimes, a huge brass section, and a rockabilly guitar. It then cuts out for the start of the first verse which is only carried by the kick of a kick drum, the hit of a floor tom and an acoustic guitar. The second verse returns the brass section and other instruments before resting for Ryo Nishikido's "Ne" and returning for the chorus. The song continues this pattern till the last few bars in which the band sings " Na na na na " to the end of the song against an accompanied piccolo trumpet.

The lyrics for "Yellow Pansy Street" are mellower than "T.W.L" and the mood of the song is a complete 180 from the upbeat, carefree, mood of "T.W.L". While the former speaks of doing your best, "Yellow Pansy Street" speaks of lost love and remembering what could have been. " You're crying, aren't you? You're crying?/I'm worried/Yesterday, the yellow pansy were blooming alongside the street/You're crying, aren't you?/I said I'm worried/If I had known/I wonder would you have smiled and laughed? "

== Critical reception ==
Not many reviews were written for this single due to policies set by Johnny and Associates, but for those available, they were generally positive. CDJournal.com stated about Yellow Pansy Street that, " The gorgeous brass sound arrangement makes this pop rock song sound cheerful, but the lively singing of trifling happiness is the appeal of this song." Yamadato Moko of Rooftop said, " Again, I can hear a pop-ish rhythm with "T.W.L", so by the time you reach "ハイ↑ High↑", sensations are overwhelmed and you're high ".

== Chart performance ==
"T.W.L/Yellow Pansy Street" debuted at number one upon its release on April 20, 2011 selling a total of 84,325 units. It became the number one top selling single for the week of April 18, 2011 and 19th sold overall single for the year of 2011. The single was later certified platinum by the Recording Industry of Japan.

== Music video ==
=== TWL ===
==== Development and release ====
The music video for "T.W.L" was filmed in one entire day on January 29, 2011 on a soundstage and directed by Tatsushi Momen. The concept of the video was for Kanjani Eight to act freely on a soundstage and act with their animated counterparts. Filming was split between three segments: a "Lip Synch Shoot", a "7 Jump Scene Shoot", and finally the "Image Shooting". The lip synching shoot involved filming the members singing along to the song while acting freely on stage. There also was a headshot scene where the members sang through a frame. The "7 Jump Scene" involved all the members standing on the edges of the sound stage and jumping off of it and finally the Image Shooting, which was the longest to film, had the members act against the green screen with props that would later have the animations added in post production.

The image shooting scenes were shot separately for each scene. Ryuhei Maruyama, Shota Yasuda, and Shingo Murakami filmed their scenes first and You Yokoyama, Tadayoshi Ohkura, Subaru Shibutani, and Ryo Nishikido filmed their scenes last. The video was aired on Space Shower TV and m-on. It was released on DVD as a coupling with the Limited Edition A version of the song's release.

==== Synopsis ====
The music video begins with the members singing the hook, alternating between headshots that introduce each member and the group singing on a stage. The video then continues on with each member interacting with their animated counterparts and the animations coming in and out of the green screens around them. Maruyama has super human strength, Yasuda can fly, Shibutani is an ace marksman, Yokoyama is a peeping tom with X-Ray vision, Nishikido is a skateboarder, Murakami has the ability to control weather, and Ohkura can control fire. Whenever they walk behind a green screen, their animated form is shown. Occasionally, their outfits flicker in color, alluding to the possibility that they're animated characters in the real world.

=== Yellow Pansy Street ===
==== Development and release ====
A scene from the Yellow Pansy Street video that showcases the heavy usage of red hues

"Yellow Pansy Street" was filmed in one entire day on location and directed by Takuya Tada. Much like the former, the concept of "Yellow Pansy Street" is amalgamation of glamour shots and the band performing. The set's colors play off of the band's look for this song's release, a red and black suit inspired by the Beatles' look of the early 60s. Filming began by shooting the glamour scenes first, which consisted of each member standing against a black background with curtains waving behind them. The lip synching part was filmed with the song sped up faster for post-production. In post, the film was slowed down so the curtains waved at a slower speed while the band member was singing in "real time".

The band scene consisted of Kanjani Eight playing their respected instruments. Crane shots were heavily used during majority of the filming with the entire band. Individual shots of each member playing their instruments was split up throughout the shoot, with certain members added in for certain angles. The last shot filmed was with all the members walking towards the camera, which was slowed down in post. The final scene had them sing with the background track sped up. Fake yellow pansy petals fell on them which was eventually slowed down in post. Production for the video ended in March 2011.

The photoshoot for the single's jacket covers and other promotional material was also taken during the filming of this music video.

==== Synopsis ====
The music video opens with an empty room of falling yellow pansy petals before cutting to Yasuda playing the opening guitar riff, Yokoyama playing the wind chimes, and Ohkura playing his drums. The first half of the video is the band playing against the backdrop of orange, yellow, and red drapes. The entire hue of this scene are in shades of red with interspersed scenes of the band slowly walking towards the camera. Muted color shots of each individual member interspersed the band scenes, with falling drapes, in the second half of the video. In the final moments of the video, the band stand in the center of the draped set, without any instruments, singing the final chorus of the song while yellow pansy petals fall on top of them. The scene switches to an empty shot of the draped room with falling yellow pansy petals before cutting to black.

== Track listing ==
=== Regular Edition ===
1. "T.W.L" (4:16)
2. "Yellow Pansy Street" (イエローパンジーストリート) (4:56)
3. "T.W.L (Original Karaoke)" (4:16)
4. "Yellow Pansy Street (Original Karaoke)" (イエローパンジーストリート) (4:52)

=== Limited Editions ===
==== A ====
1. "T.W.L" (4:16)
2. "Yellow Pansy Street" (イエローパンジーストリート) (4:56)

===== DVD =====
1. "T.W.L" Music Clip and Making

==== B ====
1. "T.W.L" (4:16)
2. "Yellow Pansy Street" (イエローパンジーストリート) (4:56)

===== DVD =====
1. "Yellow Pansy Street" (イエローパンジーストリート) Music Clip and Making

== Charts ==
Day/Week	Oricon Chart	Peak position	Sales total
Day 1	Oricon Daily Ranking	1	23,977
Week 1	Oricon Weekly Ranking	1	200,816
Year	Oricon Year Ranking	19	—
