= 8 Uppers =

- Limited Edition Cover

Studio album by Kanjani Eight
- Released: October 20, 2010
- Recorded: 2009–2010
- Genres: J-pop, R&B, rock
- Label: Teichiku

Kanjani Eight chronology
Puzzle (2009)	8 Uppers (2010)	Fight (2011)

Alternative cover

Singles from 8 Uppers
- 1. "Kyū Jō Show!!" Released: November 4, 2009; 2. "Wonderful World!!" Released: June 30, 2010; 3. "Life (Me no Mae no Mukou e)" Released: August 25, 2010

8 Uppers (8UPPERS（パッチアッパーズ）, Patchi Appāzu) is the fourth studio album released by the Japanese boy band Kanjani Eight. 8 Uppers was released a year and seven months from the release of their third album, Puzzle. There was three versions of this release: a regular edition, a CD+DVD limited edition, and a CD+2 DVD special collector's edition. First press of the regular edition came with a photobook containing pictures from the making of the unit promotional videos, the normal edition came with member solos, and both of the limited and special edition came with DVDs, the limited containing the full length featured movie of the same title and a director's gift. The special edition contained the movie and its making as well as a poster, stickers, movie program, and lyric book.

== Composition ==
The music style of 8 Uppers is, again, different from their previous albums. This time the album adopts a more generic, yet, mature feel as the songs were written to accompany the feature film of the same title. The album opens up with the movie's theme song, "Oriental Surfer", and continues its coinciding theme to the events of the movie with two more instrumental breaks, "Back Off" and "Realize". The album ends with the single, "Kyū Jō Show!!". The member solos featured on the regular edition of the album were also written for the "Prologue of Patchi", a series of music videos that serve as character introductions, which were featured on the "Wonderful World!!" and "Life (Me no Mae no Mukou e)" singles. In many ways, the album can also be looked as a soundtrack to the movie.

Majority of all the songs for the album were written by Takeshi, known for writing many works for fellow Johnny's & Associates acts, along with guest writers from Rock'A'Trench, Crazy Ken Band, Ulfuls, and others. Kanjani Eight themselves took charge over the Members' Solo album with some of them writing their own music. Tadayoshi Ohkura and Shota Yasuda collaborated to write the final track on the Members' Solo album entitled, "tte!!". When asked about writing "tte!!", Ohkura commented with:

It's Yasu's world. While the song is straight, when I heard it from Yasu a while back, I thought of where he was coming from. I wrote the lyrics, but, I intended it to fit the short movie. Yasu thought of the title and all I said was, " Alright ".

— Tadayoshi Ohkura, Wink Up, Page 14, November 2010

Yasuda, in the same interview, also added that " [...] Ska and Melodic Hardcore is Eight's weapon, I thought while writing it. ". When talking about working with Ken Yokoyama of Crazy Ken Band, many of the group's members showed slight apprehension to the aggressive, soulful, tone of the song. Yokoyama remarked with, " This has to be the hardest song. [...] I didn't believe I could sing it, but that Subaru would be great at it. When I first heard Ken's demo, I thought it was impossible [...] ".

== Singles ==
The first single released from the album was "Kyū Jō Show!!", a rockabilly-inspired tune that quickly followed up after the release of their junior album, Puzzle. The single did well, charting at #1 on the Oricon and Billboard Japan Hot 100 on its debut. A few months after, in May 2010, the second single for the album was released, titled "Wonderful World!!". Wonderful World is a playful, feel good, a-typical Japanese pop tune with the members rapping over it. The song did well, again, charting at #1 on the week of its debut. Wonderful World!!'s accompanied DVDs on the limited edition set the stage for what was going to be the new album, releasing a DVD clip of four side stories entitled, Prologue of Patchi, which consisted of the members solos.

Wonderful World!! was quickly followed by the album's third single, "Life (Me no Mae no Mukou e)" in August 2010. The song is pop-rock tune that was the featured theme song for the Japanese television drama, GM: Odore Doctor, which the group's drummer, Tadayoshi Ohkura starred in. The conclusion to "Prologue of Patchi" was included on the limited edition release of this single and included a trailer for the movie, 8 Uppers, at the end with information for fans to visit the album's website.

== Promotion ==
Promotion for 8 Uppers began with the release of "Wonderful World!!" and continued with "Life (Me no Mae no Mukou e)" with the included DVDs on the limited editions. The announcement of the interactive website, club eight on the "Life (Me no Mae no Mukou e)" single was also added promotion for the movie. The group used "Animal Magic" as the lead single for the album in September and October 2010, emphasizing the fact that Ken Yokoyama of Crazy Ken Band wrote the song for them. A music video was released for the song and they performed it on the October 1st, 2010 episode of Music Station. Subsequently, on October 11, 2010, the featured movie was in theaters for one day at Toho Cinemas nationwide leading up to the release of the album.

== CD Track listing ==
=== CD 1 ===
No.	Title	Lyrics	Music	Arranged	Length
1.	"Oriental Surfer"		Ulful Keisuke	The Go Go Go's (Ulful Keisuke x Skyfish)	3:12
2.	"Monogram" (モノグラム Monoguramu)	Hidenori Tanaka	Keisuke Noma	K. Noma, Akishi Kosai	4:31
3.	"Nakanai de, Boku no Music" (泣かないで 僕のミュージック Nakanai de, Boku no Myūjikku "Don't Cry, My Music")	Kenji Hayashida	Chokkaku	Chokkaku	4:41
4.	"Baby Baby"	Daisuke Yamamori	D. Yamamori	Rock'A'Trench, Shōgo Shōgo	4:52
5.	"Life (Me no Mae no Mukou e)"		Kanamaru Yoshifumi	Shōgo Onishi	3:53
6.	"Back Off"		DJ Kohno, Yanagiman	DJ Kohno, Yanagiman	3:25
7.	"Negai" (願い "Wish")	Shu Okamoto	S. Okamoto	Kōichiro Takahashi	4:54
8.	"Horori Melody" (ほろりメロディー Horori Merodī)	Takeshi	Takeshi	Yasutaka Kume, Takeshi, & Brass Arrangement: Yokan	4:53
9.	"Wonderful World!!"	Roadie	Roadie	Y. Kume, Brass Arrangement: Yokan	4:43
10.	"Realize"		Cell No9	Cell No9	3:12
11.	"Boy"	Kenji Fujii	K. Fujii	K. Fujii	4:14
12.	"Animal Magic" (アニマル・マジック Animaru Majikku)	Ken Yokoyama	Ken Yokoyama	K. Yokoyama, Masao Onose, Brass Arrangement: Wakaba Kawai, K. Yokoyama	4:13
13.	"Kyū Jō Show!!"	Takeshi	Takeshi	Y. Kume, Takeshi, Brass Arrangement: Yokan	4:31

=== CD 2 ===
No.	Title	Lyrics	Music	Artist	Length
1.	"Monologue"	R. Nishikido	R. Nishikido	Ryo Nishikido
2.	"Kick"	Yoshihiro Saitō	Y. Saitō	Ryuhei Maruyama
3.	"Revolver"	S. Shibutani	Sei Shin	Subaru Shibutani
4.	"Trickster"	Hiroaki Hayama	H. Hayama	You Yokoyama
5.	"Dear"	Nojo	Nojo, Katsuhiro Kudo	Shingo Murakami
6.	"Topop"	S. Yasuda	S. Yasuda	Shota Yasuda
7.	"Kitto Shiawase ga Kimi o Matteru" (きっと幸せが君を持ってる "Surely Happiness Is Waiting for You")	Yoshiyasu Ichikawa	Y. Ichikawa	Tadayoshi Okura
8.	"tte!!" (って!!)	T. Okura, S. Yasuda	S. Yasuda	Kanjani Eight

== Charting ==
Chart	Peak position	Sales/ shipments
Oricon General Album Top 10	1	231,001
