= Puzzle (Kanjani Eight album) =

- Limited Edition cover

Studio album by Kanjani Eight
- Released: April 15, 2009
- Recorded: 2009; Victor Studio; Sony Music Studio; Warner Music Recording Studio; Sound City; Sunrise Studio Towerside; Folio Sound; Azabu O Studio studio JIVE; Aobadai Studio; WESTSIDE studio
- Genre: Pop, Kayokyoku, R&B, rock
- Length: 1:32:47 (Album + Member solos)
- Label: Imperial Records
- Producer: Junji Iyobe; Masami Yoshikawa

Kanjani Eight chronology
KJ2 Zukkoke Dai Dassō (2007)	Puzzle (2009)	8uppers (2010)

Alternative cover
- Regular Edition cover

Singles from Puzzle
- 1. "It's My Soul" Released: October 17, 2007; 2. "Wahaha" Released: March 12, 2008; 3. "Musekinin Hero" Released: October 29, 2008

Puzzle (パズル, Pazuru, KJ3 Puzzle) is the third full-length album released by the Japanese boyband Kanjani Eight. Puzzle was released almost two years after the release of their second album, KJ2 Zukkoke Dai Dassō. There were two versions of this release, a regular edition and a CD+DVD limited edition. First press of the regular edition came with a photobook containing pictures from the making of the unit promotional videos, the normal edition came with member solos, and the limited edition CD+DVD came with a DVD documenting the making of the album, creation of the units, and music videos for each unit.

The music's style is, again, unlike its predecessor. Out of all the albums released by the group, "Puzzle" is considerably the most "modern" sounding album of the bunch compared to KJ1 F.T.O which was primarily an 80s era pop sound and to KJ2 Zukkoke Dai Dassou's 70s era pop sound. The album is well diverse, with a blended balance of R&B, pop, rock, and slow ballads that present the group in a more mature, "boyband", sounding nature than their more notorious "comedy" sound. Jouya Uenaka of The Inazuma Sentai returned to write for the album, producing the group's biggest to date, "Musekinin Hero", as well as writing every rock song on the album.

Kanjani Eight had a more creative control over the album, selecting from around 60 demos to sing for the album. Nishikido had personally requested Kazuyoshi Saito to write the title track of the album for the group.

Kazuyoshi Saito, Nomura Yoshio are just of many who've contributed to this album. This time we (Kanjani8) had picked from around 60 demos for the album.

— Ryo Nishikido, Potato, Page 55, May 2009

The member solos were all written and/or composed by the group themselves as well as for the special units for the album. The units themselves were picked out through a game of Jan Ken Pon during the night of their NTV Best Hit Artist 2008 performance.

== CD Track listing ==
=== CD 1 ===
No.	Title	Lyrics	Music	Arranged	Length
1.	"Ichibyou Kiss" (一秒 Kiss One Second Kiss)
2.	"Akai Shinkirou" (アカイシンキロウ Red Mirage)
3.	"Puzzle" (パズル)	Kazuyoshi Saito	Kazuyoshi Saito	Kazuyoshi Saito
4.	"Kawaita Hana" (渇いた花 Thirsty Flower)
5.	"Gori Gori" (ゴリゴリ)	Jouya Uenaka	Jouya Uenaka
6.	"It's My Soul" (イッツ マイ ソウル)
7.	"Rolling Coaster"
8.	"My Last Train"
9.	"Musekinin Hero" (無責任ヒーロー Irresponsible Hero)
10.	"Brule" (ブリュレ)
11.	"Saite Ikiyo" (咲いて生きよ Blossoming Life)
12.	"Giga Maji Mega Fight" (ギガマジメ我ファイト)
13.	"Jounetsu Party" (情熱Party Passion Party)
14.	"Wahaha" (ワッハッハー)
15.	"Donna ni hanaretetate soba ni iru kara?" (どんなに離れてたて傍にいるから How come we're so far, yet, so close?)

=== CD 2 ===
No.	Title	Lyrics	Music	Length
1.	"words"	Subaru Shibutani
2.	"no-no-no"	Tadayoshi Okura
3.	"Airairo" (アイライロ)	Shota Yasuda	Shota Yasuda
4.	"One's Shadow"	capitao
5.	"Wanshan Ropin"	HANNYA MAN
6.	"413 Man"	Yuu Yokoyama
7.	"Half Down"	Ryo Nishikido

== Charts ==
Chart	Peak position	Sales/ shipments
Oricon General Album Top 10	1	212,058
