= World Quest/Pokopon Pekōrya =

- CD-only cover

Single by NEWS
- Released: December 12, 2012
- Recorded: 2012
- Genre: J-pop
- Length: 3:32
- Label: Johnny & Associates
- Songwriter: Mozza

NEWS singles chronology
"Chankapāna" (2012)	"World Quest/Pokopon Pekōrya" (2012)

"World Quest/Pokopon Pekōrya" (WORLD QUEST/ポコポンペコーリャ) is a double A-side by the Japanese idol group NEWS. It is their 15th single and was released in Japan on December 12, 2012, under Johnny & Associates in four editions: a CD-only edition, limited editions A and B, and a special edition.

"World Quest/Pokopon Pekōrya" debuted at number one on the weekly Oricon singles chart, selling over 130,000 copies in its first week. It being their fifteenth consecutive number-one single, NEWS became the third group in history to achieve this feat. On the Billboard Japan Hot 100, "World Quest" and "Pokopon Pekōrya" peaked at numbers one and six, respectively; NEWS became the first artist to simultaneously have two songs in the top ten of that chart.

== Background ==
On October 5, 2012, it was reported that group member Shigeaki Kato would star in Tokyo Broadcasting System's (TBS) and Mainichi Broadcasting System's (MBS) Hana no Zubora-Meshi, a television series based on the manga of the same name, which would be begin airing on October 23. NEWS would sing the accompanying theme song "Pokopon Pekōrya", which was described as a "light, catchy" pop song "that would lingers in our ears". On November 5, 2012, it was announced that NEWS would be releasing "World Quest/Pokopon Pekōrya" on December 12.

== Composition ==
"World Quest" was written by Mozza, composed by Heroism, and arranged by Taku Yoshioka and Heroism. "Pokopon Pekōrya" was written by Hacchin' Maya, composed by Heroism, and arranged by Chokkaku. "Hello" was written and composed by Take4. "Quntastic!" was written by Zopp, composed by Erik Lidbom and Daichi, and arranged by Masaya Suzuki. "36°C" was written and composed by Ki Midori, and arranged by Shinjirō Inoue.

== Release and promotion ==
"World Quest/Pokopon Pekōrya" was released on December 12, 2012, in four editions: a CD-only edition, which includes the track "Hello"; limited edition A, which includes a DVD with the music video of "World Quest" and its making-of video; a limited edition B, which includes the tracks "Quntastic!" and "36°C", a 12-page booklet, and stickers illustrated by Mizusawa Etsuko; and a special edition, which includes a towel scarf and a misanga contained in a box.

"World Quest" was used at the 2012 FIFA Club World Cup association football tournament in Japan, which was hosted by group member Yuya Tegoshi.

== Chart performance ==
"World Quest/Pokopon Pekōrya" debuted at number one on the weekly Oricon singles charts, selling 130,899 copies in its first week. In doing so, NEWS became the third group in history to earn fifteen consecutive number-one singles on the chart; this feat was previously achieved by KinKi Kids in 2002 with "Kanashimi Blue" and by KAT-TUN in 2011 with "White".

On the issue dated December 17, 2012, "World Quest" debuted at number 61 on the Billboard Japan Hot 100. The following week, NEWS became the first artist to simultaneously have two charting songs in the Japan Hot 100 top ten; "World Quest" topped the chart, while "Pokopon Pekōrya" debuted at number six.

== Track listing ==
CD-only
No.	Title	Lyrics	Music	Length
1.	"World Quest"	Mozza	Heroism	3:22
2.	"Pokopon Pekōrya (フルスイング)"	Hacchin' Maya	Heroism	3:58
3.	"Hello"	Take4	Take4	3:43
4.	"World Quest" (Instrumental)		Heroism	3:32
5.	"Pokopon Pekōrya (フルスイング)" (Instrumental)		Heroism	3:58
6.	"Hello" (Instrumental)		Take4	3:43
Total length:				22:06

Limited edition A
No.	Title	Lyrics	Music	Length
1.	"World Quest"	Mozza	Heroism	3:22
2.	"Pokopon Pekōrya (フルスイング)"	Hacchin' Maya	Heroism	3:58
3.	"World Quest" (music video and making-of)
Total length:				7:20

Limited edition B
No.	Title	Lyrics	Music	Length
1.	"World Quest"	Mozza	Heroism	3:22
2.	"Pokopon Pekōrya (フルスイング)"	Hacchin' Maya	Heroism	3:58
3.	"Quntastic!"	Zopp	Erik Lidbom, Daichi	4:10
4.	"36°C"	Ki Midori	Ki Midori	3:53
Total length:				15:23

== Chart history ==
Chart (2012)	Release	Peak position
Billboard Japan Hot 100	"World Quest"	1
Billboard Japan Hot 100	"Pokopon Pekōrya"	6
Oricon Weekly Chart	"World Quest/Pokopon Pekōrya"	1
