= White (KAT-TUN song) =

Single by KAT-TUN

from the album Chain
- B-side: Perfect; Yūki no Hana; Silence
- Released: May 18, 2011
- Recorded: 2011
- Genre: Pop rock
- Label: J-One Records
- Songwriter(s): Eco, Koki Tanaka, Shusui, Daichi, Pinkcastar
- Producer(s): Johnny H. Kitagawa

KAT-TUN singles chronology
"Ultimate Wheels" (2011)	"White" (2011)	"Run For You" (2011)

"White" is the fifteenth single by Japanese boy band KAT-TUN. The track "White" is used in the "Sofina Otona no Bihaku" TV commercial, while "Perfect" is used in Kazuya Kamenashi's Aoki "3D Slim Suits" TV commercial.

== Single information ==
Fifteenth single release from KAT-TUN featuring two tie-up songs "White" and "Perfect". The limited edition includes a bonus DVD with music clip of "White" and its making-of. The regular edition includes two tie-up songs, "White" and "Perfect", plus one more song, "Silence". It also includes karaoke tracks of "White", "Perfect", and "Silence". The Regular Edition First Press includes one more song, "Yūki no Hana". It also includes karaoke tracks of "White", "Perfect", and "Yūki no Hana". It also features alternative cover artwork. According to magazine interviews, "White" took almost six months to finish recording. Members first heard this song at the end of 2010 and they recorded the first chorus part in order to use it in Sofina commercial, and other parts were completed later. The "White" promotional video was filmed in February 2011, before recording of the song had been finished. "Yūki no Hana" was KAT-TUN's message to the victims of March 2011 Tohoku earthquake and tsunami.

== Chart performance ==
In its first week of its release, the single topped the Oricon singles chart, reportedly selling 150,944 copies. KAT-TUN gained their fifteenth consecutive number one single on the Oricon Weekly Singles Chart since their debut with all their singles sold more than 200,000 copies and continued to hold the most consecutive number one singles since debut with fellow Johnny's group, NEWS. The group debuted in March 2006 and since then, they have reached number one on the Oricon chart for every single they have released. Including their five albums, which have also all topped the charts, they have reached number one 20 times consecutively. White was reported by Oricon first half rankings for 2011 to sell 170,575 copies.

By the end of the year, White was reported by Oricon to sell 174,332 copies and was later certified Gold by RIAJ denoting over 100,000 shipments.

== Track listing ==
Regular Edition First Press
No.	Title	Lyrics	Music	Length
1.	"White"	Eco, Joker	Shusui / Daichi, Pinkcastar
2.	"Yūki no Hana (勇気の花)"	Sean-D	Anthony Krunchie Bamgboye, Harry Wilkins, Ricky Hanley
3.	"Perfect"	Eco, Joker	Kosuke Morimoto, 18Degrees. (Ken Arai)
4.	"White" (Original Karaoke オリジナル・カラオケ)
5.	"Yūki no Hana" (Original Karaoke オリジナル・カラオケ)
6.	"Perfect" (Original Karaoke オリジナル・カラオケ)

CD + DVD, Limited Edition
No.	Title	Lyrics	Music	Length
1.	"White" (Video clip + Making clip ビデオ・クリップ＋メイキング)
2.	"Perfect"	Eco, Joker	Kosuke Morimoto, 18Degrees. (Ken Arai)

Regular Edition
No.	Title	Lyrics	Music	Length
1.	"White"	Eco, Joker	Shusui / Daichi, Pinkcastar
2.	"Silence"	Sean-D, Joker	David Fremberg
3.	"Perfect"	Eco, Joker	Kosuke Morimoto, 18Degrees. (Ken Arai)
4.	"White" (Original Karaoke オリジナル・カラオケ)
5.	"Silence" (Original Karaoke オリジナル・カラオケ)
6.	"Perfect" (Original Karaoke オリジナル・カラオケ)

== Chart ==
Chart	Peak	Sales
Japan Oricon Weekly Chart	1	150,944
Japan Oricon Monthly Chart	4	164,226
Japan Oricon Yearly Chart	45	174,332
