= KJ2 Zukkoke Dai Dassō =

- Limited Edition w/DVD Movie Cover

Studio album by Kanjani Eight
- Released: June 6, 2007
- Recorded: 2007; Victor Studio; Sony Music Studio; Warner Music Recording Studio; Planet Kingdom; On Air Studio; Village Studio (LA Recording
- Genre: Pop, Kayokyoku, Disco, Funk
- Length: 1:39:08 (Album + Member Solos)
- Label: Imperial Records
- Producer: Takatomo Nozawa (Office 727); Junji Murakami (Johnny & Associates)

Kanjani Eight chronology
KJ1 F.T.O (2006)	KJ2 Zukkoke Dai Dassō (2007)	Puzzle (2009)

Singles from KJ2 Zukkoke Dai Dassō
- 1. "Osaka Obachan Rock/Osaka Romanesque" Released: June 7, 2006; 2. "Kan Fu Fighting" Released: December 13, 2006; 3. "Zukkoke Otoko Michi" Released: April 11, 2007

KJ2 Zukkoke Dai Dassō (KJ2 ズッコケ大脱走, Kē Jē Tsū Zukkoke Dai Dassō, KJ2 Zukkoke The Great Escape) is the second full-length album released by the Japanese boyband Kanjani Eight. The album was released with three different versions, two limited editions and one regular edition. The regular edition release of the album and both limited edition releases came with a bonus CD featuring the member solos. The limited edition A, however, also came with a DVD movie entitled "Zukkoke Treasure Panic!". Limited Edition B featured a hidden bonus track on the Member Solos disc.

Musically, the album is a complete 180 from their previous album. Majority of the songs are of the Funk/Disco genre, notable tracks being "Big Sky Blues", "Speedy Wonder", and the album's title track, " Great Escape ~Dai Dassou~ ". Kanjani Eight do dive right back into their 'enka/kayokyoku' roots with the song, "Futari no Namida Ame", but the rest of the album takes off with generic pop and rock. The most noticeable change in this album, compared to last, is the creative control the group displays in the member solos. All the solos, save for You Yokoyama's, were written and/or composed by the members themselves.

Front man of the Osaka-native Japanese rock band, The Inazuma Sentai, wrote several songs for this album. Due to the success and popularity of these songs, Jouya Uenaka returned again to write several other songs for the group.

== CD Track listing ==
=== CD 1 ===
No.	Title	Lyrics	Music	Arranged	Length
1.	"Big Sky Blues"	Takeshi Aida	Gatz	T.Nozawa	4:27
2.	"Speedy Wonder"	Chokkyu Murano	Masayuki Iwata	Iwata	4:38
3.	"∞Saka Obachan Rock (type LAKJ2)" (∞SakaおばちゃんRock)	Yoji Kubota & Kanjani8	Koji Makaino	Michael J. Acosta	5:23
4.	"Futari no Namida Ame" (二人の涙雨 Our Light Rain)	Tsuyoshi Shirasagi	Hiroo Ooyagi	NMotoki Funayama	3:58
5.	"Goujou ni Go!" (強情にGo! Stubbornly Go!)	Jouya Uenaka	Hiroyuki Kubo	Ryomei Shirai & The Inazuma Sentai	3:33
6.	"Great Escape ~Dai Dassou~" (Great Escape ~大脱走~)	Aida	GATZ	T.Nozawa	4:56
7.	"Sayonara wa itsumo" (さよならはいつも Goodbye, always)	Tatsurou Masahiko	Masahiko	Masahiko & T.Nozawa	4:38
8.	"Jimoto no Ousama" (地元の王様 Hometown King)	Jouya Uenaka	Tomoki Ishizuka	Ishizuka	4:22
9.	"Zukkoke Otoko Michi" (ズッコケ男道 The Foolish Manly Road)	Jouya Uenaka	Pierre	Ryomei Shirai	5:09
10.	"Energy" (エネルギー)	micro+grande	""	""	4:20
11.	"Tabi no Hate ni wa" (旅の涯には For the horizon's journey)	Shinichi Asada	Velvetronica	Masaki Iehara	4:22
12.	"Arigatou" (ありがとう。 Thank you)	Dora	Dora	T.Nozawa	3:59
13.	"Kan Fu Fighting" (関風ファイティング)	MASA	Kouji	Kouji	4:18

=== CD 2 ===
No.	Title	Lyrics	Music	Arranged	Length
1.	"Ruuwa" (琉我)	Subaru Shibutani	Arata Tanimoto	Michael J. Acosta	3:59
2.	"Watashi Kagami" (わたし鏡 My Mirror)	Shota Yasuda	Shota Yasuda	Ryomei Shirai	5:19
3.	"Magic Word ~Boku nari no...~" (Magic Word ~僕なりの．．．~)	HANNYA MAN	Minoru Komorita	Naoki Otsubo	5:17
4.	"Mamoritai" (まもりたい I want to protect you)	Tadayoshi Okura	Ayumi Miyazaki & Ami	Yasumasa Sato	3:46
5.	"WONDER BOY"	Takeshi Isozaki	Takeshi Isozaki	Takeshi Isozaki	4:39
6.	"Forward"	capitao	Minoru Komorita	ha-j	3:52
7.	"stereo"	Ryo Nishikido	Masahiko	Masahiko & T.Nozawa	3:58
8.	"~Gachinko Session~ Itsuka, mata..." (～ガチンコセッション～ いつか、また...。 ~ Earnest Session~ Again, someday)	Takeda Iida	Takeda Iida	Kanjani8	10:01

== DVD: Zukkoke Treasure Panic ==
The DVD Movie that came with the limited edition A version of this album was 15 minutes long. The movie is about seven individuals trapped in a cave. Each member assumes a stereotypical RPG character role. Once they name themselves, the King (You Yokoyama) has a fit and throws his crown, activating the laser security. Smith, the priest, (Ryo Nishikido) notices that there's treasure at the other side of the temple. The King orders Tony, the hunter, (Shota Yasuda) to get it and then they all start to run for the treasure. Suddenly they realize that the entire temple is booby trapped and now have to avoid the traps while racing each other to the treasure.

Eventually they start to turn on each other and things get chaotic. After Gurus, the Vagabond, (Ryuhei Maruyama) has had enough of being the one most subjected the booby traps, he runs towards the treasure chest, triggering all the traps and the group makes a mad dash. When they reach the treasure chest, they open it up to reveal Kanjani8 sitting around a table playing a video game—Which turns out to be that they're the video game Kanjani8 is playing. After arguing with their video game counterparts, Kanjani8 resets the video game.

=== Cast ===
- The King - You Yokoyama
- Cabinet Minister - Shingo Murakami
- The Magician, Raichou the Second - Subaru Shibutani
- Gurus, The Vagabond - Ryuhei Maruyama
- Tony, The Hunter - Shota Yasuda
- Smith, The Priest - Ryo Nishikido
- Tadayoshi, The Hero - Tadayoshi Okura

== Charts ==
Chart	Peak position	Sales/ shipments
Oricon General Album Top 10	1	211,805
