= Kan Fu Fighting =

"Kanfū Fighting"
- Regular Edition Cover

Single by Kanjani8

from the album KJ2 Zukkoke Dai Dassō
- Released: December 13, 2006
- Genre: Pop
- Length: 17:55
- Label: Teichiku Records

Kanjani8 singles chronology
"Osaka Obachan Rock/Osaka Romanesque" (2005)	"Kanfū Fighting" (2006)	"Zukkoke Otoko Michi" (2006)

"Kan Fu Fighting" (関風ファイティング, Kan Fū Faitingu) is the fifth single released by the Japanese boyband Kanjani Eight. The single was released with 8 different versions, 7 of them focusing on one specific member and the 8th single being the regular edition. Each of the limited edition singles contained a phone strap in the image color of the band member.

The release of "Kan Fu Fighting" was the first #1 spot the group obtained since the release of their first single, "Naniwa Iroha Bushi". The song was so popular that it remained the #1 most request song on the Kansai area ABC Radio's ABC Music Paradise for 22 days straight, breaking the record previously set by KinKi Kids back in 1997 with their debut song, "Garasu no Shounen". By the 2007 half year, Kan Fu Fighting a sold an overwhelming 397,734 copies.

== Track listing ==
=== Regular edition ===
1. Kanfuu FIGHTING (関風ファイティング)
2. PROPELLER (プロ∞ペラ)
3. SAMURAI BLUES (サムライブルース)
4. Mirai no Mukou e (未来の向こうへ)

=== Limited edition ===
1. Kanfuu FIGHTING (関風ファイティング)
2. PROPELLER (プロ∞ペラ)"
3. Kanfuu FIGHTING (Karaoke) (関風ファイティング (カラオケ))
