= KJ1 F.T.O =

KJ1 F·T·O
- Limited Edition Cover

Studio album by Kanjani Eight
- Released: March 15, 2006
- Recorded: 2005
- Genres: Pop, Enka
- Length: 58:57 (Limited Edition)
- Label: Teichiku Records
- Producer: Johnny H. Kitagawa

Kanjani Eight chronology
Kansha ni Eight (2004)	KJ1 F·T·O (2006)	KJ2 Zukkoke Dai Dassō (2007)

Singles from KJ1 F·T·O
- 1. "Osaka Rainy Blues" Released: March 2nd, 2005; 2. "Sukiyanen, Osaka/Oh! Enka/Mugendai" Released: September 14, 2005; 3. "Osaka Obachan Rock/Osaka Romanesque" Released: June 7, 2006

KJ1 F·T·O (KJ1 Funky Town Osaka) is the first full-length album released by the Japanese boyband Kanjani Eight.The album features a full 14 tracks that dabble in generic pop, rock, and Enka. Majority of the songs off of the album split the group in units, such as "Hatenaki Sora" being a Shota Yasuda/Ryo Nishikido duet and "Carnival" being a Ryuhei Maruyama/Tadayoshi Okura duet, among others.

Musically, the album is almost completely pop with only two songs passing off into the Enka/Kayokyoku genre of Japanese music. Despite this, the album was categorized as an Enka album and as such the album ranked on the Oricon's general music charts as well as the Enka/Kayokyoku charts. This allowed the group to achieve a record of being the first Enka artist to have two consecutive releases reach the top 5 of the Enka/Kayokyoku charts and be the first Enka artist in 32 years to reach the top 3 general music charts.

== CD Track listing ==
=== Limited Edition ===
No.	Title	Lyrics	Music	Arranged	Length
1.	"F·T·O"	Higuchi Ryouichi	Higuchi	CHOKKAKU	4:45
2.	"Kanashii Koi" (悲しい恋 Sorrowful Love)	MASA	Makaino Kouji	Makaino	3:52
3.	"Osaka Romanesque" (大阪ロマネスク)	Aida Takeshi	Tanimoto Arata	ha-j	4:45
4.	"Taiyou no Kodomo" (太陽の子供 Children of the Sun)	MASA	Makaino	Nagaoka Seikou	4:49
5.	"Carnival"	Makaino	Makaino	Mori Toshiyuki	5:09
6.	"Mugendai [KJ1 Mix]" (無限大 Infinity)	MASA	Makaino	Makaino	4:26
7.	"Hatenaki Sora" (果テナキ空 Endless Sky)	Kubota Youji	Iida Takehiko	Nagaoka	5:02
8.	"Heat Is On"	Narumi Kazuto	Narumi	Suzuki Yuya	4:28
9.	"Misetekure" (ミセテクレ Show Me)	Iioka Takashi; Yasuda Shota (Rap)	Iioka	Shimizu Akio	4:28
10.	"Oh! Enka [KJ1 Mix]" (桜演歌(Oh!ENKA))	MASA	Kouji	Kouji	3:56
11.	"Sore de Ii n' ja Nai" (それでイイんじゃない Isn't this fine?)	Narumi	Narumi	Ishizuka Tomoki	4:33
12.	"ONE"	SUBARU	Yasuda Shota	SubaruBAND	3:56
13.	"Osaka Rainy Blues [ver KJ1]" (大阪レイ二ーブルーズ)	MASA	Kouji	Kouji	4:58
14.	"Sukiyanen, Osaka." (好きやねん、大阪。)	Iijimaken	Iijimaken	Yoshioka Taku	3:50

The limited edition release of F·T·O also featured a DVD showcasing the backstage footage from their F·T·O.N concert tour.

=== Regular Edition ===
The regular edition of the album contained the tracks listed for the limited edition release, as well as two additional tracks from the sub-unit, SanKyouDai

No.	Title	Lyrics	Music	Length
1.	"Purin" (プリン Pudding)	Yuu	Chipa
2.	"Onigishi" (オニギシ)	Yuu	Chipa

== Charting ==
Chart	Peak position	Sales/ shipments
Oricon General Album Top 10	2	161,985
Oricon Enka/Kayokyoku Album Top 10	2	N/A
