= Tsubusa ni Koi =

- Regular Edition

Single by Kanjani8
- Released: 17 August 2011
- Genre: Pop
- Length: 32:59:01
- Label: Imperial Records

Kanjani8 singles chronology
| "365 Nichi Kazoku" (2011) | "Tsubusa ni Koi" (2011) | "Ai Deshita" (2012) |

Limited Edition
- Limited Edition

"Tsubusa ni Koi" is a single release by the Japanese boyband Kanjani8. This release marks their 19th single. The single was used as the theme song for the Fuji Television drama, Zenkai Girl.

== Track listing ==
=== Regular Edition ===
1. "Tsubusa ni Koi" (ツブサニコイ, Love Again and Again) (4:56)
2. "I to U" (4:17)
3. "Nanairo Parameeta" (七色パラメータ, 7 Colored Parameter) (4:00)
4. "Hi & high" (3:19)
5. "Tsubusa ni Koi" (ツブサニコイ (Original Karaoke), Love Again and Again) (4:56)
6. "I to U (Original Karaoke)" (4:17)
7. "Nanairo Parameeta (Original Karaoke)" (七色パラメータ, 7 Colored Parameter) (4:00)
8. "Hi & high (Original Karaoke)" (3:15)

=== Limited Edition ===
1. "Tsubusa ni Koi" (ツブサニコイ, Love Again and Again) (4:56)
2. "I to U" (4:17)

==== DVD ====
1. "Tsubusa ni Koi" (ツブサニコイ, Love Again and Again) Music Clip and Making

== Charts ==
| Day/Week | Oricon Chart | Peak Position | Sales Total |
|---|---|---|---|
| Day 1 | Oricon Daily Ranking | 1 | — |
| Week 1 | Oricon Weekly Ranking | 1 | 152,859 |
| Month of August | Oricon Monthly Ranking | 4 | 169,917 |
| Year | Oricon Year Ranking | 39 | — |
