= 365 Nichi Kazoku =

- Regular Edition

Single by Kanjani8
- Released: 8 June 2011
- Genre: Pop
- Length: 29:17
- Label: Imperial Records

Kanjani8 singles chronology
"My Home" (2011)	"365 Nichi Kazoku" (2011)	"Tsubusa ni Koi" (2011)

Limited Edition
- Limited Edition

"365 Nichi Kazoku" is a single release by the Japanese boyband Kanjani8. This release marks their 18th single. The single was used as the theme song for the Tokyo Broadcast Systems drama, Umareru.

== Track listing ==
=== Regular edition ===
1. "365 Nichi Kazoku" (３６５日家族; 365 Day Family) (5:43)
2. "Train in the Rain" (4:13)
3. "9 gousha 2 ban A seki" (9号車2番A席; 9th Cart, 2nd Row, Seat A) (5:11)
4. "Eightpop!!!!!!!!" (4:16)
5. "365 Nichi Kazoku (Original Karaoke)" (３６５日家族; 365 Day Family) (5:43)
6. "Train in the Rain (Original Karaoke)" (4:13)

=== Limited edition ===
1. "365 Nichi Kazoku" (３６５日家族; 365 Day Family) (5:43)
2. "Train in the Rain" (4:13)

==== DVD ====
1. "365 Nichi Kazoku" (３６５日家族; 365 Day Family) Music Clip and Making

== Charts ==
Day/Week	Oricon Chart	Peak Position	Sales Total
Day 1	Oricon Daily Ranking	1	—
Week 1	Oricon Weekly Ranking	1	158,141
Year	Oricon Year Ranking	40	—
