= My Home (Kanjani Eight song) =

2011 single by Kanjani Eight

- Regular Edition

Single by Kanjani8
- Released: 11 May 2011
- Genre: Pop
- Length: 23:23
- Label: Imperial Records

Kanjani8 singles chronology
"T.W.L/Yellow Pansy Street" (2011)	"My Home" (2011)	"365 Nichi Kazoku" (2011)

Limited Edition
- Limited Edition

"My Home" is a single released by the Japanese boyband Kanjani8. This release is their 17th single. The single was used as the theme song for the TV Asahi drama, Inu wo Kau to Iu koto ~Sky to Waga ga Uchi no 180 Nichi ~.

== Track listing ==
=== Regular edition ===
1. "My Home" (マイホーム) (4:31)
2. "Baby Moonlight" (3:35)
3. "Futari no Hana" (二人の花; Our Flower) (3:35)
4. "Hanikami Oburicaado" (はにかみオブリガード; A Shy Obbligato) (3:16)
5. "My Home (Original Karaoke)" (マイホーム) (4:31)
6. "Baby Moonlight (Original Karaoke)" (3:35)

=== Limited edition ===
1. "My Home" (マイホーム) (4:31)
2. "Baby Moonlight" (3:35)

==== DVD ====
1. "My Home" Music Clip and Making

== Charts ==
Day/Week	Oricon Chart	Peak Position	Sales Total
Day 1	Oricon Daily Ranking	1	—
Week 1	Oricon Weekly Ranking	1	158,060
Year	Oricon Year Ranking	36	—
