= Wahaha (song) =

- Regular Edition Cover

Single by Kanjani8

from the album Puzzle
- Released: March 12, 2008
- Genre: J-pop
- Length: 18:56
- Label: Imperial Records

Kanjani8 singles chronology
"It's My Soul" (2007)	"Wahaha" (2008)	"Musekinin Hero" (2008)

"Wahaha" (ワッハッハー, Wahhahhā) is the eighth single released by the Japanese boyband Kanjani8. The single featured two versions, a limited and regular edition. The limited-edition single came with a seven-page photobook.

Because this single was the eighth one that they released, they played on the pronunciation of the number 8, hachi, with the pronunciation of the Japanese word for bee, also hachi, and used it for hidden gag in the CD's promotion and jacket art. Shota Yasuda dressed up like a bee and was featured in the promotional video and limited edition CD booklet.

== Track listing ==
=== Regular Edition ===
1. " Wahaha "
2. " Dare yori mo Suki dakara "
3. " BJ "
4. " Wahaha <Original Karaoke> "

=== Limited Edition ===
1. " Wahaha "
2. " Dare yori mo Suki dakara "
3. " Wahaha <Original Karaoke> "

== Charts ==
Week	Oricon Weekly	Peak position	Sales total
March 24, 2008	March Week 4	1	194,304
March 31, 2008	March Week 5	8	14,745
April 7, 2008	April Week 1	14	6,974
