= Ai Deshita =

"Ai Deshita."
- Regular Edition

Single by Kanjani8
- Released: June 13, 2012
- Genre: Pop
- Label: Imperial

Kanjani8 singles chronology
"Tsubusa ni Koi" (2011)	"Ai Deshita." (2012)	"ER" (2012)

Limited Editions
- Limited Edition

"Ai Deshita." is a release by the Japanese boyband Kanjani8. The single was announced on April 17, 2012, as the theme song of the TBS drama, "Papa Doru" which starred the group's own Nishikido Ryo in the lead, and that it would be on sale sometime in June. On May 11, 2012, official information and details were released on the single stating that there would be two versions of the release, a limited and regular edition, and that the single will officially be sold on June 13, 2012. On May 18, the jacket details were released and on May 31, information about a lottery tickets inserted in the single towards a free live at Osaka's Kyocera Dome were also announced.

The song, Ai Deshita., is a standard pop-rock ballad. It incorporates guitars, drums, and strings into the overall composition. Vocally, the song is split with harmonies between Ryuhei Maruyama and Yuu Yokoyama, Shota Yasuda and Shingo Murakami, and Subaru Shibutani and Ryo Nishikido on lead. Along with Shibutani and Nishikido, Tadayoshi Ohkura also sings solo verses.

== Music video ==
=== Development and release ===
The short version music video for "Ai Deshita." was debuted on m-on's Sukidori on May 31, 2011.

=== Synopsis ===
The music video opens up with Nishikido sleeping on a leather couch in an empty apartment. The video then cuts to the band performing in an empty field before jump cutting between each member singing against a white wall. The video then continues to alternate between band scenes, solo shots against the white wall, and scenes of each member interacting with each other in the apartment or outside the apartment. The short version of the music video fades out during the instrumental break.

== Track listing ==
=== Regular Edition ===
1. "Ai Deshita." (愛でした。; It was Love)
2. "Midare sake Romance" (乱れ咲けロマンス)
3. "Merry Go Round"
4. "Rurarira" (ルラリラ)
5. "Ai Deshita. (Original Karaoke)" (愛でした。; It was Love)
6. "Midare sake Romance (Original Karaoke)" (乱れ咲けロマンス)
7. "Merry Go Round (Original Karaoke)"
8. "Rurarira (Original Karaoke)" (ルラリラ)

=== Limited Edition ===
1. "Ai Deshita." (愛でした。; It was Love)
2. "Midare sake Romance" (乱れ咲けロマンス)

==== DVD ====
1. "Ai Deshita." Music Clip and Making
