= I Wanna Punch That Scumbag! =

Japanese television series

- Promotional poster
- Japanese: あのクズを殴ってやりたいんだ
- Genre: Romantic comedy; Japanese television drama
- Screenplay by: Yoko Izumisawa; Keiko Kanome
- Directed by: Shingo Okamoto; Yasuharu Ishii; Sakura Komaki
- Starring: Nao; Yuta Tamamori
- Music by: fox capture plan
- Ending theme: "Meriba" by People1
- Country of origin: Japan
- Original language: Japanese

Production
- Producers: Mitsuki Tomura; Daiki Sai; Masako Miyazaki
- Running time: 57 minutes
- Production company: TBS TV

I Wanna Punch that Scumbag! (Japanese: あのクズを殴ってやりたいんだ, Hepburn: Ano kuzu wo nagutte yaritainda) is a romantic comedy television series scheduled to air in the Tuesday Drama slot on TBS Television from October 2024. It stars Nao.

The catchphrase for this television series is "My love hurts."

Yuta Tamamori plays Kairi Kuzuya, a mysterious blond man who meets the main character, Hokomi. This is his first appearance in a Tuesday drama in three years since Oh My Boss! Love Not Included. It is a completely original scripted television series about a woman who takes both love and boxing earnestly.

== Premise ==
The protagonist, Hokomi Sato (Nao), is a 29-year-old woman with a serious personality who works at a Kawasaki city hall, fictitious Kawasaki City, not the real Kawasaki, Kanagawa. After her boyfriend ran away from her on her wedding day and she also discovered that he had been unfaithful, she decided never to be steady with a scumbag again. Then she met Kairi Kuzuya (Yuta Tamamori), a kind and friendly man. He was to be the photographer at her wedding. Kairi encouraged Hokomi with gentle words and saved her troubles. And when he suddenly kissed her, she felt destined for him and gradually fell in love with him. However, she soon realized that Kairi was a scumbag who had the same gentle words for many other women, making them fall in love with him and spending a lot of money on him. She became so angry with Kairi that she joins a boxing gym to beat him up. However, she gradually learns of Kairi's secret past.

== Production ==
Television producer Mitsuki Tomura said that they created an original script to tell the story of a woman's growth through boxing and her love affair with someone she initially thought she disliked, but who she comes to gradually fall in love with. The main character, Hokomi, is a serious and clumsy woman, but her mere presence brightens up those around her and makes them want to cheer her on, so she was cast as a perfect match for Nao. Kairi is a man with secrets and is difficult to grasp, with a carefree smile and a dark expression. Tomura cast Tamamori for the role of Kairi because of the gap between when Tamamori smiles and when he has a straight face.

About the work, Nao, the lead actress, said that she is excited to see what kind of work it will be because she has never seen a combination of a romantic comedy and boxing in a television series before. She said she hopes to convey to everyone the appeal of boxing and the beauty of building trust with others. Nao also said she had never played a role where she was devoted to a sport before, and her mother wondered why Nao was chosen to play a role where she boxed. She said that more than four months prior to the start of this broadcast, she began restricting her diet and went to the gym to work on her muscle training. Thanks to her efforts, she was able to take on the filming with full preparation. Tamamori said that he was glad when he received the offer but also felt a lot of pressure. He said that it had been a long time since he had acted in a love story, so he wanted to give his all to the role. He said that Kairi is a character he has never played before, so he hoped that he could inspire the viewers. He said he hopes people will look forward to the television series, which is a romantic comedy but has various messages and is a passionate work. For this role, Tamamori also underwent a physical transformation. After a concert by his boy band Kis-My-Ft2 in February, Tamamori weighed 59 kilograms (130 lb), gained 13 kilograms (29 lb) in two months with muscle training, then lost more than 12 kilograms (26 lb) again.

Also cast as a boxer from the Hanegi Gym in this work is current WBO Women's World Super flyweight Champion boxer Mizuki Hiruta. Also, professional boxer Tenshin Nasukawa will appear. It was announced that Nasukawa, making his first appearance in a drama, will appear in every episode as a different character.

== Promotion ==
Prior to the broadcast of the television series starting in October 2024, television series appearing with Tamamori, La Grande Maison Tokyo, Oh My Boss! Love Not Included, Youth Detective Haruya and He is Beautiful, were streamed for a limited time from September 2024 on the free to stream TVer. Prior to the start of the drama's broadcast on October 8, a giant billboard was set up in the underground passageway of Shibuya Station, and adhesive bandages with the program's logo were distributed free of charge. At Shibuya Station on the Tōyoko Line, the program was advertised on digital signage. Starring Nao and Tamamori appeared as secret guests at the Rakuten GirlsAward 2024 Autumn/Winter held at Makuhari Messe on October 19, 2024, while the theme song was playing, where they walked the catwalk in front of an audience of 23,000 people and promoted this television series.

== Reception ==
As of 8 January 2025, the television series holds an approval rating of 64% on Filmarks, based on 362 reviews, with an average rating of 3.2/5. Many of the comments on Filmarks praised lead actress Nao's performance in the authentic boxing scenes and the beauty of the kissing scenes, while others noted that the storyline in the middle was dark and that the ending was somewhat predictable. Some viewers also mentioned that seeing friends or assistants of the main characters who did not seem to wish them happiness made the drama emotionally challenging to watch.

Mantanweb highlighted viewers’ reactions on social media following the drama's broadcast. Many expressed their emotions about key moments, such as being moved by the scene where Hokomi and Kairi, who had been apart for a long time, finally reunite. Others shared their hopes for supporting characters, for example, wishing that Oba – who had an unrequited love for Nao but remained a good person until the end – would find happiness in his next romance.

Television critic Yamakawa analyzed that the time slot for this series was often watched by viewers hoping to enjoy the romance between the main characters, but that the drama contained fewer romantic elements than expected and instead focused on serious boxing, which contributed to the moderate viewer ratings.

== Cast ==
Nao as Hokomi Sato
Hokomi is 29 years old and has a serious personality. On her wedding day, her fiancé runs away, and she discovers that he has been cheating on her. She begins to develop feelings for Kairi, but is once again disappointed by him. Determined not to stay with such a scumbag any longer, she takes up boxing to transform herself.
Yuta Tamamori as Kairi Kuzuya
A mysterious man who works as a photographer by day and a bartender by night. He meets Hokomi while photographing a wedding at the venue where she is to be married. Friendly and popular with women, Kairi hides a painful past: seven years ago, he fought a match against his senior boxer, Daichi Hirayama, whom he had admired like an older brother. Daichi tragically died after the match, an incident that left him deeply traumatized. Until that time, he had been a boxer at Hanegi Gym.

=== Hanegi gym ===
Sae Okazaki as Yui Hanegi
Yui is the daughter of the Gym owner of the Hanegi boxing gym that Hokomi attends. She had aspired to become a professional boxer, but due to certain circumstances, she now works as a trainer at the gym. At first, Yui treats Hokomi harshly, since Hokomi knows nothing about Kairi's past. She is also deeply concerned about Kairi's current situation, as he is living in a self-destructive way. Secretly, she harbors feelings for Kairi.
Atsuro Watabe as Sei Hanegi
The Gym owner of the Hanegi boxing gym where Hokomi attends. He is a former boxer and a former champion of Japan.
Mizuki Hiruta as Kaori Ichihara
She is a promising boxer who belongs to the Hanegi boxing gym.

=== Kawasaki city hall ===
Yuta Koseki as Kanato Oba
An elite civil servant who works at the same city hall as Hokomi. He is excellent at his job and has a gentle nature, but is not good at love. He has long harbored unrequited feelings for Hokomi, who is always working so hard.
Shiori Tamai as Nade Nitta
A co-worker who works at the same city hall as Hokomi. She has a cheerful personality and is a close personal friend of Hokomi's. However, she feels jealous of Hokomi, who is well-liked by everyone and excels at her job.

=== Sato Family ===
Yui Narumi as Sayami Sato
The younger sister of Hikomi. She is divorced and raising her daughter, Mimi, while helping out at her mother's snack bar. She is the complete opposite of Hokomi; she is free-spirited and prone to getting into steady relationships with scumbag men, but she has a cheerful personality.
Yuki Saito as Akemi Sato
Hokomi's mother. She has been with only scumbag men in her life. Currently, she is a mom of a small snack bar, but she is still popular with men and always has a boyfriend. She has a cheerful personality that can laugh off any misfortune.

=== Others ===
Yuki Kura as Satoru Aizawa
He is an assistant to Kairi, a photographer. He is Kairi's roommate and lives in the same room with Kairi. He adores Kairi, but in fact, he has a secret that he cannot tell Kairi.
Shunsuke Daito as Daichi Hirayama
A benefactor who picked up Kairi as a runaway boy 11 years ago. Senior boxer.
Takahiro Hamada (West) as Yuya Izaki
Kairi's friend from his boxing days and a professional boxer.

== Staff ==
- Screenplay: Yoko Izumisawa, Keiko Koname
- Producer: Korai Tomura, Daiki Sai, Masako Miyazaki
- Director: Shingo Okamoto, Yasuharu Ishii, Sakura Komaki
- Production Writings: TBS Television
- Music: fox capture plan
- Theme Song: "Meriba" by People1

== Broadcast schedule ==
	Date	Subtitle	Screenplay	Director	Rating
#01	8 October 2024	I don't want to keep losing!	Yoko Izumisawa	Shingo Okamoto	6.6%
#02	15 October 2024	The identity of that scumbag	Yoko Izumisawa	Shingo Okamoto	5.5%
#03	22 October 2024	I'm not going to love that scumbag!	Keiko Kanome	Yasuharu Ishii	5.5%
#04	29 October 2024	That scumbag's precious person	Yoko Izumisawa	Yasuharu Ishii	5.6%
#05	5 November 2024	Confession of that scumbag	Keiko Kanome	Shingo Okamoto	5.0%
#06	12 November 2024	A re-started scumbag and love	Yoko Izumisawa	Sakura Komaki	5.0%
#07	19 November 2024	First date? Intense feelings of a rival in love	Keiko Kanome	Yasuharu Ishii	5.2%
#08	26 November 2024	Battle of love? I still love you...!	Yoko Izumisawa	Yasuharu Ishii	5.2%
#09	3 December 2024	I want you to be happy... that scumbag's choice	Keiko Kanome	Sakura Komaki	4.9%
#10	10 December 2024	I love that scumbag!	Yoko Izumisawa	Shingo Okamoto	5.7%
Average viewer rating 5.3% (Viewership ratings are from Video Research, Kanto region, households, real time)

== I Want to Forgive That Night ==
The original side story titled I Want to Forgive That Night was distributed on TVer after the broadcast of the sixth episode on November 12, 2024. It is a one-situation romantic comedy set in "Snack Akemi," a bar run by the mother of the heroine Sato Hokomi, and depicts various cast members who are not shown in the main story.

=== Cast (Side Story) ===
- Yuta Koseki as Kanato Oba
- Shiori Tamai from Momoiro Clover Z as Nade Nitta
- Yui Narumi as Sayami Sato
- Shunya Asano as Shun Kojima
- Nao as Hokomi Sato

=== Staff (Side Story) ===
- Screenplay – Miho Yuda
- Directed by – Daiki Sai, Hiroaki Ito
- Produced by – Daiki Sai, Mitsuo Tomura, Masako Miyazaki
- Production Credits – TBS TV
