= Key Person of Interest Detective =

Manga series by Murako Kinuta and TV drama

- Cover of the first manga volume

重要参考人探偵 (Jūyō Sankōnin Tantei)
- Manga
- Written by: Murako Kinuta
- Published by: Shogakukan
- Imprint: Flowers Comics α
- Magazine: Monthly Flowers
- Original run: May 2013 – March 2018
- Volumes: 7

Key Person of Interest Detective (重要参考人探偵, Jūyō Sankōnin Tantei) is a Japanese manga series by Murako Kinuta.

The series was serialized in Shogakukan's Monthly Flowers magazine from May 2013 to March 2018. A total of seven volumes of the manga have been published under their Flowers Comics α imprint.

It was adapted into a TV drama series on TV Asahi in the Fall 2017 season.

== Introduction ==
Kei Maneki, a model belonging to a small modeling agency, has somehow developed a "constitution" of finding dead bodies one after another ever since he discovered a dead body when he was five years old. Because he is always the first to find a dead body, the police suspect him of being a "key person of interest". One day, he goes on a photo shoot for work with fellow models Itsuki Suo and Simon Toma, where they find a dead body. However, Kei is too calm because he is used to dead bodies, and the cops suspect him. Kei, Itsuki, and Simon begin to deduce the truth in order to clear Kei's name.

== Main characters ==
Kei Maneki
The protagonist. He is an eight-headed model belonging to the weak modeling agency "Wave". He is feisty, quarrelsome and quick to snap. He is usually the first person to find a corpse and the key witness. Unlike Itsuki, who calls himself a "great detective," he solves cases with true excellence in deductive reasoning.
Itsuki Suo
Kei's fellow model. He is a great deductive maniac, and when Kei gets involved in a case, he happily develops his deductions, but they are often off the mark.
Simon Toma
Kei's fellow model. He likes to pick up women of all ages in his spare time, but he does so from the bottom of his heart, and even the elderly women he meets seem to be unaffected by his words and actions. As a hobby, he models nude drawings at an art college.

== Bibliographic information ==
- Key Person of Interest Detective by Murako Kinuta Shogakukan Total 7 vols.
  - Volume 1 Released on March 10, 2015, ISBN 978-4-09-136806-5
  - Volume 2 Released on February 10, 2016, ISBN 978-4-09-138235-1
  - Volume 3 Released on July 8, 2016, ISBN 978-4-09-138627-4
  - Volume 4 Released on December 9, 2016, ISBN 978-4-09-138683-0
  - Volume 5 Released on June 9, 2017, ISBN 978-4-09-139310-4
  - Volume 6 Released on November 10, 2017, ISBN 978-4-09-139790-4
  - Volume 7 Released on June 8, 2018, ISBN 978-4-09-870124-7

== Television drama ==
Key Person of Interest Detective
- Key Person of Interest Detective (Japanese: 重要参考人探偵, Hepburn: Jūyō Sankōnin Tantei)
- Genre: Mystery fiction; Comedy drama
- Based on: "Key Person of Interest Detective" by Murako Kinuta
- Screenplay by: Tsutomu Kuroiwa
- Directed by: Renpei Tsukamoto; Tadaaki Hourai; Takashi Komatsu
- Starring: Yuta Tamamori
- Music by: Yu Takami
- Ending theme: "Red fruits" by Kis-My-Ft2
- Country of origin: Japan
- Original language: Japanese
- No. of episodes: 8

Production
- Executive producer: Ikuei Yokochi
- Producers: Akiko Emmy Kanda; Chizu Asai; Tatsuya Hongou
- Running time: 60min
- Production companies: TV Asahi; Media Mix Japan Co.Ltd.

Original release
- Release: 20 October – 8 December 2017

The TV drama series Key Person of Interest Detective aired every Friday from October 20 to December 8, 2017, at 11:15 pm – 0:15 am in the "Friday Night Drama" slot on TV Asahi. It starred Yuta Tamamori.

A comedy-mystery series adapted from the manga of the same title. The main character, who is the first to find a dead body each time, deduces the cause with the help of two of his friends in a complete story format. The theme song, "Red fruits" by Kis-My-Ft2, was written especially for this work.

=== For dramatization ===
The three model friends who are the main characters in the story were played by Yuta Tamamori, Keiichiro Koyama, and Yuki Furukawa. Tamamori, who plays Kei, the main character, always ends up being the first to discover a dead body. Because of the nature of his role, he thought, "I should change my acting and reactions because the same thing happens every time," and he prepared for his role by discussing his facial expressions in particular with the director.Koyama, who plays the mystery maniac Itsuki, is Tamamori's senior at Johnny & Associates and has not appeared in a drama series in about five years. Koyama himself felt difficulties because it had been a long time since he had acted in a drama, but he was able to interpret the role well when the director asked him to "feel like a real person". The role of Simon, who comically picks up women, was the first challenge for Furukawa, who plays the role. Furukawa has often played cool roles in the past, but in this film he changed his appearance with a long hair wig to play a sociable and cute role.

This film is also very particular about its sets. Although the director, Renpei Tsukamoto, gave only minimal instructions regarding the modeling agency "Wave," where the film takes place, it was created by the art staff with a "mid-century American feel" in mind. This was inspired by the costume of the office president, played by Kenichi Takitō, and features retro furniture and brick walls. Numerous other sets were also created, including a party hall and a lodge. In particular, the theater where the fourth episode takes place was built by Takashi Komatsu, the director, who drew a floor plan faithful to the original story and built the set inside an actual theater.

=== The Knife and the Sword ===
Prior to the drama's broadcast, the TV drama The Knife and the Sword, in which Tamamori also starred in the "Friday Night Drama" slot in 2013, was rebroadcast in Kantō region. Mirai Shida, who played the role of Natsu who supported Tamamori's character Ken in that drama, made a guest appearance in the second episode of the film as the actress Yuri Otohara. There is a line in the drama that suggests that the two have not seen each other since Sengoku period, "450 years ago." In addition, the theme song from The Knife and the Sword is played in the scene where the main character holds a kitchen knife in episode 3.

=== Evaluation ===
In a review of the first episode in "The television preview room", Tamamori as Kei, Koyama as Itsuki, and Furukawa as Simon, who play the main roles, were described as "three people with exquisitely shared roles," and the rest of the cast as well balanced, making it a "work that fans from various walks of life can enjoy. On the other hand, in "The page," Koji Shiba described the solving of the mystery itself as "more of a drama to enjoy the three handsome men than a full-fledged mystery," however, he described Tamamori's performance as "His performance is attracting, with both subtlety and single-minded intensity. He has gone from the stage of being a good actor among idols to the stage where he is genuinely appreciated as an actor".

=== Synopsis ===
Kei Maneki, a model, is a man with a peculiar constitution. For some reason, he is the first to find dead bodies in various places and situations. To avoid getting his college classmate Karin Saotome into trouble, he broke up with her without telling her why. Several years later, Kei is the first one to find a dead body at a watchmaker's party he attends for work with fellow models Itsuki Suo and Simon Toma , and is reunited with Karin, who shows up at the scene as a detective. Kei is suspected by the police, but with the help of Itsuki and Simon, he deduces the true culprit and clears his own suspicion. However, after being the first person of interest in a series of murders, Karin is ordered by her boss, detective Manabu Toichi, to keep an eye on Kei as much as possible, even on days when he is off duty. Kei's defining line is, "Now I, the keyperson of interest, will tell the truth." In this one-part mystery fiction story, the mystery of Kei's childhood lost memory and his father is revealed in the latter half of the drama.

=== Characters ===
Kei Maneki
Actor - Yuta Tamamori
A model belonging to the modeling agency "Wave" .Everywhere he goes, he becomes the first person found murdered and has to shout "I'm not the murderer!". He was fed up with such a situation. However, when he was put in a tight spot as an important witness, he declared, "Now I, the keyperson of interest, will tell the truth," and gathered his thoughts while stalling for time. He finds out the truth and deduces the culprit.
Karin Saotome
Actress - Yuko Araki
Drama original character. The heroine of the film. She is a rookie detective in the Metropolitan Police Department's Investigation Division. In fact, she is Kei's college classmate and ex-girlfriend. She broke up with him unilaterally due to Kei's peculiar condition of repeatedly finding dead bodies, so when they meet again at the scene of an investigation, she is blunt.
Itsuki Suo
Actor - Keiichiro Koyama
A fellow model who belongs to the same office as Kei. He is a self-proclaimed master detective who is a mystery maniac and yearns to be a detective. He has a frivolous personality and always seems envious of Kei, who is involved in the case as a key witness, but in fact he is worried about Kei.
Simon Toma
Actor - Yuki Furukawa
A fellow model who belongs to the same agency as Kei. He is a natural character with a friendly personality. He likes to pick up women but has no ulterior motive, and can befriend any woman regardless of age, which sometimes leads to unexpected information.
Shinosuke Namie
Actor - Kenichi Takitō
President of the modeling agency Wave.
A former charismatic model himself, he is well-connected and well-informed.

=== Broadcast Schedule ===
#	Date	Subtitle	Director
#1	20 October 2017	A man who somehow finds a dead body	Renpei Tsukamoto
#2	27 October 2017	Murder auditions and the "dots and lines" of 10 years ago	Renpei Tsukamoto
#3	3 November 2017	A secret room murder on a mountaintop!!! Mystery of the exquisite curry	Tadaaki Hourai
#4	10 November 2017	Murder Shakespeare	Takashi Komatsu
#5	17 November 2017	Neighbor's Secret! Celebrity Murder	Renpei Tsukamoto
#6	24 November 2017	Murder Fashion Show! Mystery of the Missing Body	Takashi Komatsu
#7	1 December 2017	The truth about the hot-spring murders and 20 years ago	Tadaaki Hourai
#8	8 December 2017	Murder 20 years ago...confront the real murderer!	Renpei Tsukamoto
Average viewer rating 4.8% (ratings are based on Video Research, Kantō region, households)

=== Related products ===
The DVD and Blu-ray, which also includes over 113 minutes of bonus footage such as a roundtable discussion among the four main cast members, a production announcement press conference, and making-of featurettes, were released on June 6, 2018. Both debuted at No. 1 in the drama genre on the Oricon Weekly DVD and BD rankings dated June 18.

- Key Person of Interest Detective released by TC Entertainment, Inc.
  - Blu-ray box (TCBD-0714)
  - DVD box (TCED-3880)
- Original sound track music by Yu Takami
  - Mastard Records (LNCM-1248)
