= Patient Chart Prayer =

2018 novel by Mikito Chinen

- Author: Mikito Chinen
- Language: Japanese
- Genre: Mystery fiction
- Published: 2018-03-29
- Publisher: Kadokawa Corporation
- Publication place: Japan
- Pages: 248
- Followed by: Reunion therapy of patient chart prayer
- Website: Patient Chart Prayer

Reunion therapy of patient chart prayer
- Author: Mikito Chinen
- Language: Japanese
- Genre: Mystery fiction
- Published: 2022-08-10
- Publisher: Kadokawa Corporation
- Publication place: Japan
- Pages: 243
- Preceded by: Patient Chart Prayer
- Website: Reunion therapy of Patient Chart Prayer

Patient Chart Prayer (祈りのカルテ) is a Japanese medical mystery novel by Mikito Chinen. It is a series of short stories consisting of five episodes. It was published by Kadokawa corporation on 29 March 2018, followed by a paperback edition by Kadokawa corporation on 25 February 2021.

A sequel, Reunion therapy of Patient Chart Prayer was published by Kadokawa corporation on 10 August 2022.

The author, Mikito Chinen, is a novelist and a physician. Many of his works have medical themes, and this is one of them.

Television dramatisation in the October 2022 season.

== Introduction ==
=== Prayer medical charts ===
Ryota Suwano, who graduated from Junseikai Medical College and entered the university's affiliated hospital as a resident, has been visiting various departments for his initial clinical training. One day, a female patient was brought to the emergency room with an overdose of sleeping pills. The name of her estranged husband was burnt into her arm....

=== Reunion therapy of prayer medical charts ===
After finishing his presentation at the Japanese Society of Internal Medicine held at the Tokyo International Forum, 30-year-old Ryota Suwano ran into Yuu Kotori, his classmate and best friend from medical school, and Mai Konnoike, a female resident at the hospital where he works, and immediately asked them to have a drink.

== Characters ==
=== Patient chart prayer ===
==== Main charactor ====
Ryota Suwano
The protagonist of this work. Resident physician at the Junseikai Medical College Hospital.
Yuya Saeki
Suwano's best friend since medical school and also a resident at Junseikai Medical College Hospital. His father, Shinya, is a surgical supervisor.
Satomi Tateishi
Psychiatric supervisor. A woman in her 30s with a bob cut.
Shinya Saeki
A supervisor of surgery. He is also the father of his best friend.

=== Reunion therapy of patient chart prayer ===
==== Main Charactor (Reunion therapy) ====
Ryota Suwano
He is now 30 years old. At the time of his recollection, he was a second-year resident.
Yuu Takanashi
She was a classmate and close friend when they were both medical students.
Mai Konnoike
A 25-year-old female resident at Tenjikai General Hospital.
Shuta Hirose
A middle-aged man who complains of irregular complaints and is a regular visitor to the emergency department at night.

== Bibliographic Information ==
- Patient Chart Prayer by Mikito Chinen
  - Book: March 29, 2018, Kadokawa Corporation, ISBN 978-4-04-106580-8
  - Paperback: February 25, 2021, Kadokawa Corporation, ISBN 978-4-04-110980-9
- Reunion therapy of Patient Chart Prayer by Mikito Chinen
  - Book: August 10, 2022, Kadokawa Corporation, ISBN 978-4-04-112536-6

== Television drama ==
Patient Chart Prayer
- 祈りのカルテ 研修医の謎解き診察記録
- Genre: Mystery fiction; Medical drama; Drama
- Based on: Patient Chart Prayer; Renuion theaphy of Patient Chart Prayer; by Mikito Chinen
- Screenplay by: Nonji Nemoto
- Directed by: Shunsuke Kariyama; Chihiro Ikeda; Yuma Suzuki
- Starring: Yuta Tamamori
- Music by: Hadime Sakita
- Ending theme: "Omoibana" by Kis-My-Ft2
- Country of origin: Japan
- Original language: Japanese
- No. of episodes: 11

Production
- Executive producer: Hirofumi Tanaka
- Producers: Mami Fujimori; Ryoji Tokura
- Running time: 54 min
- Production company: Nippon TV

Original release
- Release: October 8 – December 17, 2022

Television drama under the title Patient Chart Prayer was broadcast from October 8 to December 17, 2022, in the "Saturday Drama" slot on Nippon TV. The leading role was played by Yuta Tamamori.

Mami Fujimori, the producer, explained the reason for the dramatization: "In this work, there are no super doctors or black intrigue within the hospital, as is often the case in Japanese medical dramas. I thought it was very appealing to see inexperienced and flawed doctors trying their best for their patients and being there for them."

For the dramatization, the obstetrics and gynecology in episode 3 and general medicine in episode 4 were newly added as original stories, and many scenes not found in the original novel, such as cheerful interactions with fellow residents, were added. Mikito Chinen, the author of the original story, observed the filming of the drama. He saw a scene in which the residents interacted with each other and commented, "The relationships between fellow residents were very realistically portrayed, reminding me of my residency days."

The drama is filmed at Chiba University Hospital in Chiba Prefecture. The hospital is famous for being used for filming famous Japanese medical dramas such as "Doctor-X: Surgeon Michiko Daimon" and "Shiroi Kyotō".

=== Synopsis (Television drama) ===
Ryota Suwano is a kind-hearted resident doctor who shows a talent at reading people's emotions. Although he is still inexperienced, he seems to be constantly trying throughout the series and is portrayed as a man who is good at reading people's emotions with a kind heart. At the department where he is training at Junseikai Medical University Hospital, he meets supervisors that happen to be unordinary and patients with various circumstances.

When he is stuck in treating a patient in his charge, he reads the patient's medical chart and then comes up with a solution.

His signature line is, "The patient's chart told me everything."

Through meeting and parting with many people, he grows into a full-fledged doctor.

=== Cast ===
Age is at the start of the story.

==== Main Characters ====
Ryota Suwano (age 25) by Yuta Tamamori
The protagonist of this work. He is a first year to second year resident at the Junseikai Medical University Hospital. Suwano is the surname of his mother's second marriage.
Midori Soneda (age 25) by Elaiza Ikeda
She is a fellow resident with Ryota. She wants to be a surgeon and is the best among her classmates.
Yuya Saeki (age 25) by Yuma Yamoto
He is a resident doctor in the same class as Ryota. The youth of nowadays. His father is a surgeon, Shinya Saeki, who is also his supervisor.
Satomi Tateishi (age 49) by Yasuko Matsuyuki
Psychiatrist. She and Shinya were classmates when they were in university. She likes fortune telling, including tarot readings.
Shinya Saeki (age 55) by Kippei Shiina
Surgeon. Yuya's father.
Shuta Hirose by Taizo Harada
A patient. He visited the emergency room at night, where Ryota examined him. He continues to care about Ryota in some way after he is discharged from the hospital.

=== Staff ===
- Original work written by Mikito Chinen
  - Patient Chart Prayer（Kadokawa Corporation）
  - Reunion therapy of Patient Chart Prayer (Kadokawa Corporation）
- Screenplay - Nonji Nemoto
- Music - Hadime Sakita
- Theme song - "Omoibana" by Kis-My-Ft2 (MENT Recording）
- Direction - Shunsuke Kariyama, Chihiro Ikeda, Yuma Suzuki
- Chief Producer - Hirofumi Tanaka
- Producer - Mami Fujimori, Ryoji Tokura (AX-ON Inc.)
- Production cooperation - AX-ON Inc.
- Company - Nippon TV

=== Public reactions ===
- In the fifth episode, "I want to eat gyoza (chinese dumpling)" became the top trending topic on Twitter after a patient with a serious illness requested to eat gyoza.
- In addition to this drama, two other medical dramas were broadcast in the October 2022 season. Medical dramas are popular in Japan, and the content that viewers prefer is gradually becoming more diverse.

=== Broadcast Schedule ===
	Date	Subtitle	Program Introduction in Newspaper	Direction	Rating
#01	8 October 2022	Psychiatry department	Heartwarming mystery in which a resident doctor solves a patient's mystery with medical records	Shunsuke Kariyama	6.6%
#02	15 October 2022	Surgical department	A mystery that moves the heart! Bordering on Malignancy... Refusing Surgery, A Patient's Mystery	Shunsuke Kariyama	6.5%
#03	22 October 2022	Obstetrics and gynecology department	The training program is obstetrics and gynecology... the mystery of the pregnant woman and the father of two who refuses to be examined.	Chihiro Ikeda	6.9%
#04	29 October 2022	General radiology department	Is General Medicine a Department that Solves Mysteries? Tears over the cause of a patient's repeated mysterious seizures	Chihiro Ikeda	6.6%
#05	5 November 2022	Cardiology department	Actress in secret hospitalization hides a sad lie from her sister... the biggest trial and tear of Ryota's training.	Shunsuke Kariyama	6.0%
#06	12 November 2022	Pediatrics department	Cinderella's breath...The Mystery of the Asthmatic Girl Who Disappears Many Times at the Pediatrician's Office	Chihiro Ikeda	5.9%
#07	19 November 2022	Emergency and critical care department	Night in the Emergency Department is a battlefield! A former gangster's gentle lie and the bond between father and son	Yuma Suzuki	6.7%
#08	26 November 2022	Dermatological department	The burn patient is a serial arsonist! Final chapter... Suwano's real father appears.	Chihiro Ikeda	6.4%
#09	10 December 2022	Nephrological department	Who is blocking the transplant surgery of a 17-year-old bride! New facts interrupting Suwano father and son	Shunsuke Kariyama	5.3%
#10	17 December 2022	Palliative Care Department	Thank you for fathering me in my last days. ...... Tearful Reunion and Decision	Shunsuke Kariyama	6.8%
Average viewer rating 6.4% (Viewership ratings are from Video Research, Kanto region, households, real time)
