= Yuta Tamamori =

Japanese actor and singer (born 1990)

- 玉森 裕太
- Born: March 17, 1990 (age 36); Tokyo, Japan
- Other names: Tama, Tama-chan
- Occupations: Actor; Singer; Idol
- Years active: 2002–present
- Agent(s): Johnny & Associates (2002–2023); Starto Entertainment (2024–present)
- Musical career
- Genre: J-pop
- Instrument: Vocals
- Label: MENT Recording
- Member of: Kis-My-Ft2
- Website: Yuta Tamamori on Instagram; Kis-My-Ft2(Starto Entertainment); Kis-My-Ft2(MENT Recording)

Yuta Tamamori (Japanese: 玉森 裕太, Hepburn: Tamamori Yūta; born March 17, 1990) is a Japanese singer and actor. He is a member of the boy band Kis-My-Ft2 under Starto Entertainment.

As an actor, he is known for his roles in television dramas such as Gokusen, He is Beautiful, Reverse, and La Grande Maison Tokyo, for which he won the Best Supporting Actor award at the Television Drama Academy Awards (for La Grande Maison Tokyo). He has also appeared in films including Parallel World Love Story and Shylock's Children.

In 2023, he provided the Japanese dubbing voice for Wade Ripple in Pixar's Elemental, marking his first major voice-acting role.

In addition to his entertainment career, he has been active in the fashion industry and has attended major fashion events in Europe.

== Early life ==
Tamamori was born in Tokyo in 1990 and grew up with his younger brother. His mother was 17 years old at the time of his birth, a fact he has mentioned in interviews when reflecting on his upbringing.

When he was in his first year of junior high school, his mother sent a résumé on his behalf to Johnny & Associates. Although he was initially reluctant to attend the audition, he ultimately went and passed. On December 1, 2002, he joined the agency alongside peers such as Yuya Tegoshi and Hikaru Yaotome.

As a trainee, he appeared on television programs and became a member of several junior groups, including J.J. Express and A.B.C. Jr.

== Career ==
=== Early career ===
Kis-My-Ft2 was formed on July 26, 2005, with Tamamori selected as one of the members. Before the group's official debut, he spent six years working as a backup dancer for senior artists and groups such as Tackey & Tsubasa, NEWS, KAT-TUN, and Hey! Say! JUMP, gaining experience through concerts and stage productions.

Often described as shy, he continued working as a backup dancer during these years and later became one of the group's central members after their debut.

=== Acting career ===
Tamamori made his acting debut in the Nippon Television drama Gokusen Graduation Special (2009) and appeared in the film Gokusen: The Movie the same year. The Gokusen series, known for launching the careers of many young actors, was widely popular in Japan.

He gained wider recognition in 2011 for his leading role as the reserved band leader Ren Katsuragi in He is Beautiful, a Japanese adaptation of the Korean series You're Beautiful.

In 2013, he achieved his first starring roles in television dramas with A Chef of Nobunaga, in which he portrayed a modern-day chef transported to the Sengoku period, and Pintokona, where he played the heir to a traditional kabuki acting family. These roles established him as a leading actor.

He continued to expand his range with performances such as a conflicted teacher in Reverse (2017) and a young chef with a troubled past in La Grande Maison Tokyo (2019), where he starred alongside Takuya Kimura. His performance in the latter earned him Best Supporting Actor at the Television Drama Academy Awards.

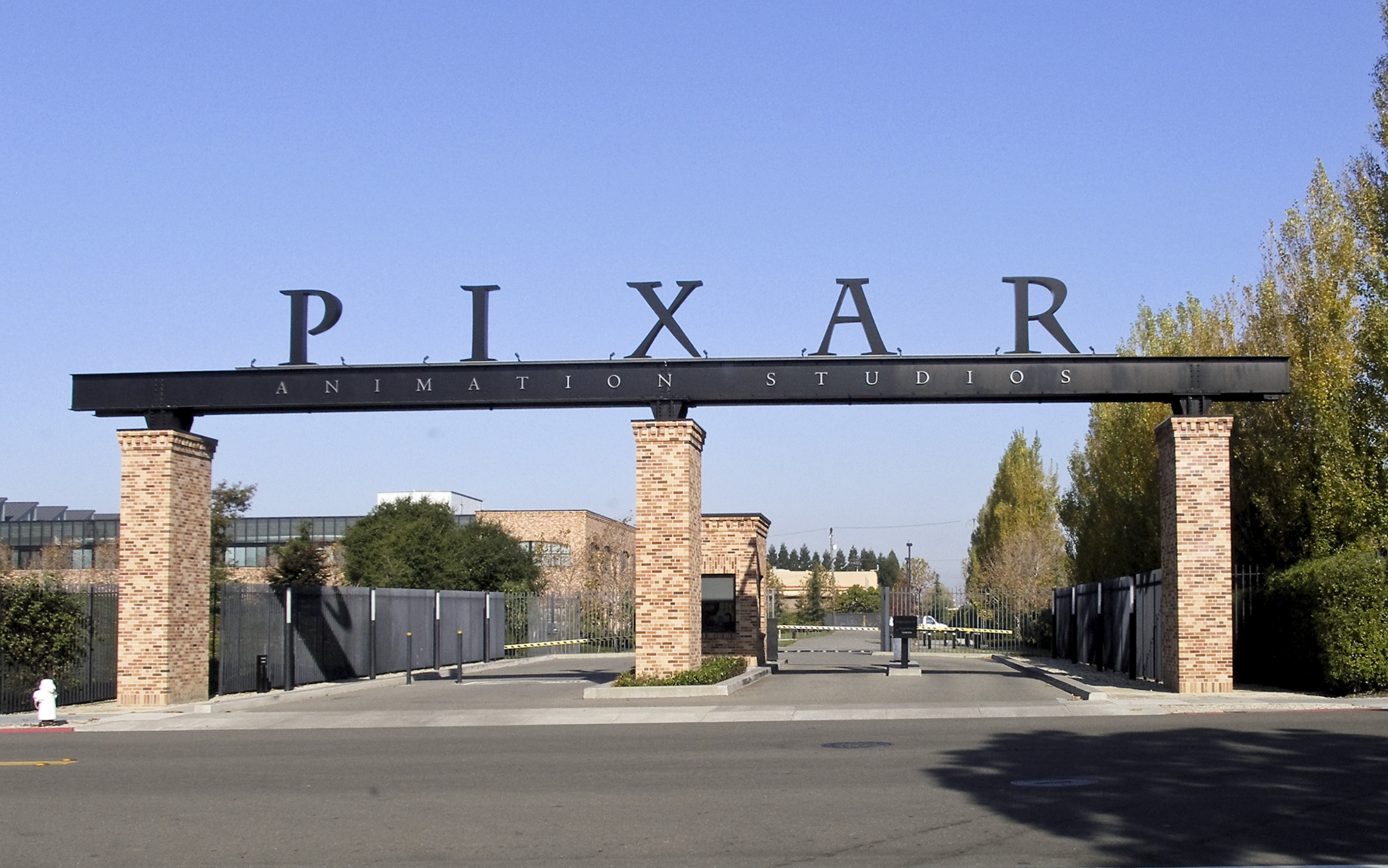
Pixar Animation Studios in Emeryville, California, where Tamamori visited in connection with Elemental (2023)

In 2021, Tamamori appeared in Oh My Boss! Love Not Included as the female lead's love interest. In 2022, he starred in the TV Asahi drama Nice Flight! (July–September), produced in collaboration with Japan Airlines, and in Nippon TV's Patient Chart Prayer (October–December), marking two consecutive lead roles in television dramas that year.

In 2023, he provided the Japanese dubbing voice for the protagonist Wade Ripple in Pixar's Elemental, marking his first major voice-acting role. He was selected for the role through an audition conducted at Pixar's U.S. headquarters and later visited the studio, where he met with director Peter Sohn.

=== Music career ===
As a central member of Kis-My-Ft2, Tamamori has frequently been featured in the group's performances and media appearances, including songs used as theme music for television dramas in which he has starred.

Within the group, he has performed numerous solo songs and duet songs. His solo works include songs such as "Alive" (2016) and "Share Love" (2021), both of which received dedicated music videos highlighting his individual artistic image.

He has frequently collaborated with fellow Kis-My-Ft2 member Toshiya Miyata on duet songs and related projects, including "Be Love," "Hoshi ni Negai wo," and "Unmei." These works later inspired the television drama Be Love (2020), in which the two appeared together. The partnership between Tamamori and Miyata dates back to their trainee days.

== Variety shows ==
In June 2012, Tamamori appeared on the variety program Ikinari! Ougon Densetsu, known for its physically demanding projects. At the time, no talent from Johnny & Associates had previously participated in the program.

He took part in the segment "Celebrity Savings Battle: Living on 10,000 Yen for a Month” (芸能人節約バトル1ヶ月1万円生活 最強No.1決定戦), competing against comedian Shigeo Takahashi and competitive eater Gal Sone.

In this challenge, contestants were required to cover food and utility expenses within a monthly budget of 10,000 yen. Tamamori, who had little cooking experience, purchased a large quantity of onions directly from a farmer and relied on them as a primary ingredient throughout the challenge. He prepared several dishes centered on onions, including Japanese curry and onion rings, and became known on the program by the nickname "Onion-kun" (Tamanegi-kun). He also prepared handmade noodles and attempted to catch fish during the challenge.

While continuing his regular professional activities, such as concert tours and drama filming, he completed the month-long challenge and ultimately won the contest. The program was widely popular in Taiwan and other parts of Greater China, and his appearance in the challenge attracted attention from overseas audiences.

== Public image ==
=== Influence ===
Since the mid-2010s, Tamamori has often been recognized in Japanese media for his charm and enduring popularity. In ViVi magazine's "National Treasure-Class Handsome Ranking" (Kokuhō-kyū Ikemen Ranking), organized by Kodansha since 2015, he has repeatedly ranked within the top tiers. After appearing in the rankings several times between 2016 and 2018, he later achieved higher recognition in the "Adult" category (for men aged 30 and over), ranking prominently in 2021 and continuing to place in subsequent years.

Tamamori has also been rated favorably in public image surveys conducted by Architect Co., Ltd., which evaluate public awareness and likability of Japanese celebrities through its "Talent Power Ranking" surveys. Throughout the early 2020s, he consistently ranked highly in categories highlighting actors with a clean-cut, refreshing, and approachable image across different age demographics.

=== As a model ===
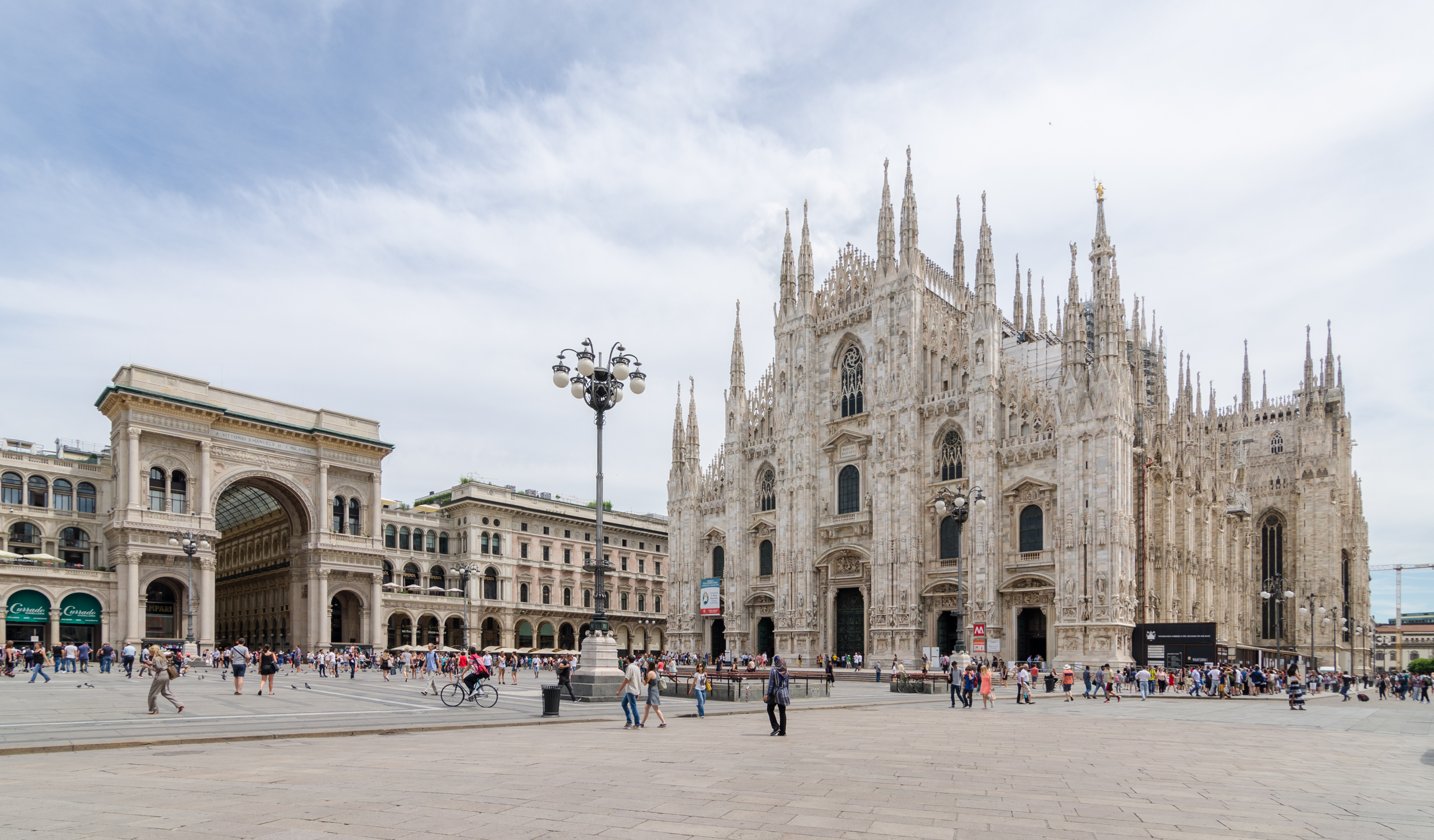
The Piazza del Duomo area in Milan, where major fashion events are held

Beyond his acting career, Tamamori is also known for his fair complexion and strong presence in the fashion industry. He frequently appears solo on the covers of fashion magazines, some of which have sold out following their release. In March 2022, he became the ambassador for Lancôme's skincare product Clarifique, a role considered rare for a male celebrity. Later that year, he received the "Most Beautiful Person" Grand Prize at Kodansha's VOCE Best Cosmetics Awards 2022. Tamamori has also expressed a long-standing interest in Cartier accessories since shortly after his debut, and in recent years has been invited to several events hosted by the brand.

Tamamori's involvement in the fashion industry expanded internationally in the 2020s, as he began attending major fashion events in Europe by invitation from luxury brands. His appearances at fashion weeks and exhibitions drew attention to his presence beyond Japan and positioned him as a Japanese celebrity active on the global fashion stage.

His first invitation to a European fashion event came in April 2024, when he attended the From the Heart to the Hands: Dolce & Gabbana exhibition in Milan, Italy, marking a milestone in his overseas activities. He subsequently attended major international fashion events in Europe as a guest, including the AMIRI Spring/Summer 2025 Menswear Fashion Show at Paris Fashion Week in June 2024, the Brunello Cucinelli Fall/Winter 2025 Womenswear Collection presentation at Milan Fashion Week in February 2025, and the Bottega Veneta Spring/Summer 2026 fashion show in September 2025, where he was seated in the front row.

In addition to his public appearances at fashion events, Tamamori has also been involved in creative work behind the scenes. His activities in fashion-related production were documented in the program Yuta Tamamori Mode, which followed his approach to design and artistic direction.

=== Endorsements and appearances ===
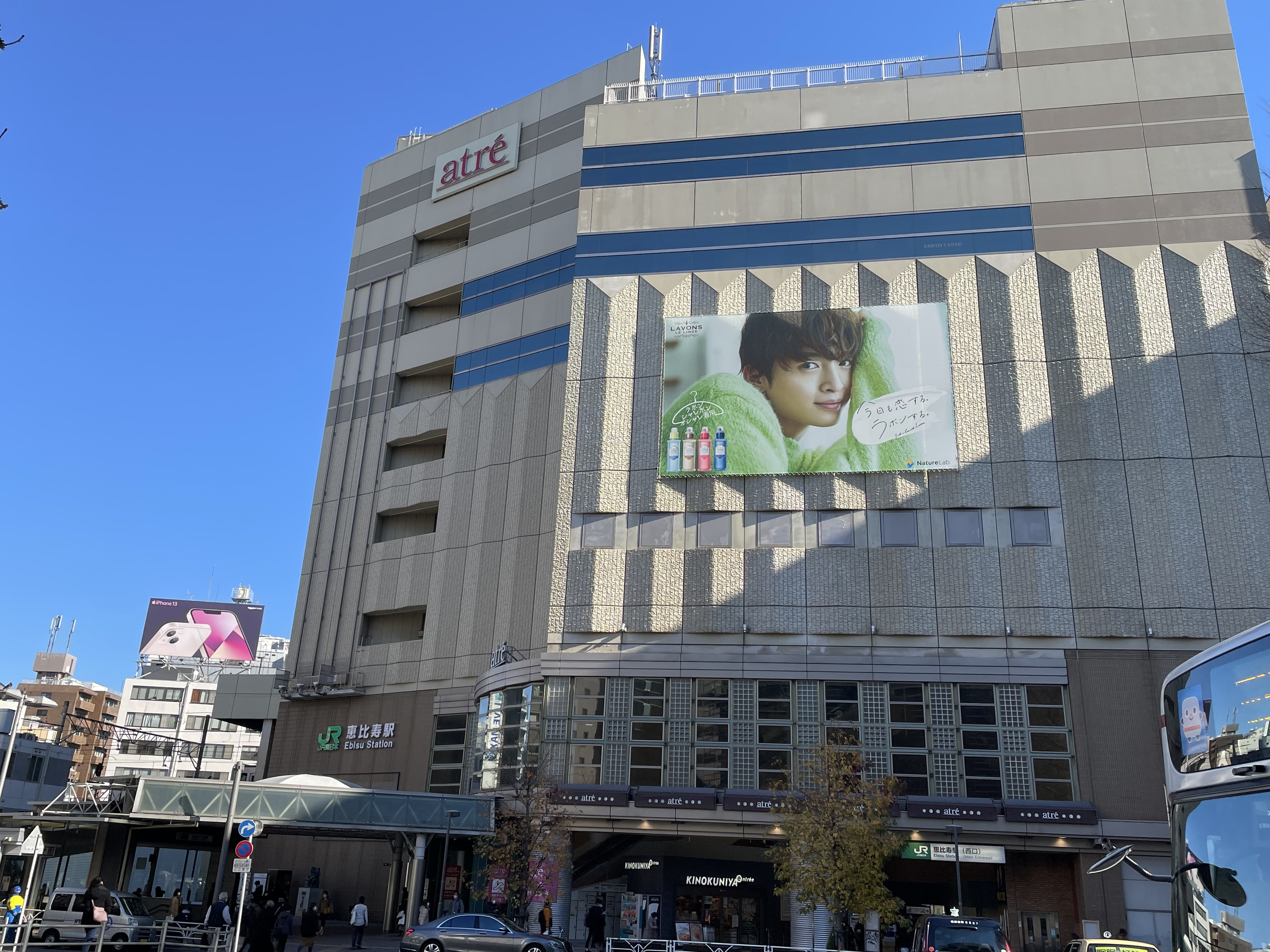
Atre Ebisu in Tokyo with an outdoor advertisement featuring Tamamori

Since 2014, Tamamori has served as the spokesperson for the household brand "LAVONS". In connection with this partnership, he has also appeared at events organized by the brand's parent company NatureLab, including performing ceremonial serves at home games of the Tokyo Great Bears volleyball team for three consecutive years from 2024 to 2026.

=== Stage costumes ===
Building on his fashion-related creative activities, since 2018, Tamamori has been responsible for designing the stage costumes for Kis-My-Ft2, drawing on his strong interest in fashion. In interviews, he has stated that understanding each member allows him to enhance their individual appeal on stage. His design approach often moves beyond the members' assigned colors and incorporates personal motifs, such as floral elements reflecting his fondness for flowers, as well as text used as a visual feature.

Notable examples of his work include the costumes created for the group's 10th anniversary in 2022, which featured the symbol "X," each member's initial, and patchwork elements made from past costumes as a tribute to the group's history. In 2024, he designed jewel-embellished outfits weighing approximately 8 kilograms (18 pounds), demonstrating an emphasis on visual impact. In addition, he has been involved in selecting fabrics and has traveled abroad to source materials personally, including a visit to the Dongdaemun Market in Seoul, South Korea, a major textile hub with thousands of specialty stores, during preparations for the group's 2025 concert costumes.

In addition to concert attire, he designed fashion show–inspired costumes for the music video of the album track "Cheat," which were later used on stage and praised for highlighting each member's individuality.

== Personal life ==
=== Musical inspirations and reflections ===
Tamamori has often spoken about songs and artists that influenced his outlook as a performer. He has expressed a deep attachment to Noriyuki Makihara’s "Boku ga Ichiban Hoshikatta Mono," noting that its message about giving to others resonated strongly with him, especially after the COVID-19 pandemic when his group was unable to perform for audiences for an extended period. He later connected the lyrics to his own work as an idol, saying that the presence of fans is what gives meaning to his activities.

Tamamori is also a fan of British singer-songwriter Anne-Marie. She once appeared as a surprise guest on the group's variety program, performing his favorite song "Perfect," which left him deeply moved. In 2024, he also attended her concert in Tokyo, describing it as an inspiring experience.

=== Hobby ===
Tamamori has expressed an interest in fishing, nature, and animals. He previously kept a flying squirrel as a pet and has spoken about enjoying time with his family's dog. He surfed frequently as a child due to his family's interest in the sport but later reduced his surfing activities after being advised to avoid tanning during his trainee years.

== Filmography ==
=== Films ===
Year	Title	Role	Notes	Ref.
2009	Gokusen: The Movie (ごくせん THE MOVIE)	Reita Takasugi		
2012	Shiritsu Bakaleya Kōkō — The Movie	Kenji Mashima		
2013	Ataru – The Movie: the First Love & the Last Kill	Noboru Ebina		
2015	World of Delight	Nobuyuki Sakisaka	Leading role	
2019	Parallel World Love Story	Takashi Tsuruga	Leading role	
2023	Shylock's Children	Yōji Tabata		
2024	La Grande Maison Paris	Shohei Hirako		

=== Television series ===
Year	Title	Role	Notes	Ref.
2009	Gokusen	Reita Takasugi		
2011	The Marriage Counselor	Yūji Yanagisawa		
2011	He is Beautiful	Ren Katsuragi	Leading role	
2012	The Best Way to End a Life: Ending Planner	Yōichirō Kuraki	Episodes 1 and 2	
2012	Ataru	Noboru Ebina		
2013	Pintokona	Kyōnosuke Kawamura / Takeshi Kawamura	Leading role	
2013–14	A Chef of Nobunaga	Ken	Leading role; 2 seasons	
2014	Tales of the Unusual: Spring 2014	Masashi Akita		
2015	War of Money	Shiraishi Kotaro		
2015	Youth Detective Haruya	Asagi Haruya	Leading role	
2017	Reverse	Kosuke Asami		
2017	Key Person of Interest Detective	Kei Maneki	Leading role	
2019	Tales of the Unusual: Rain 2019	Hijiri Kuroki		
2019	La Grande Maison Tokyo	Shōhei Hirako		
2019	Gura Gura Maison Tokyo	Shōhei Hirako	Leading role	
2020	Be Love	Picture book writer	Leading role (Note: Tamamori and Toshiya Miyata starred together. Delivered for a limited time.)	
2021	Oh My Boss! Love Not Included	Junnosuke Horai		
2022	Nice Flight!	Sui Kurata	Leading role	
2022	Patient Chart Prayer	Ryōta Suwano	Leading role	
2024	I Wanna Punch That Scumbag!	Kairi Kuzuya		
2024	La Grande Maison Tokyo Special	Shohei Hirako		
2026	Gift	Sora Sakamoto		
2026	My Fiction	Masaki Igawa	Leading role	

=== Documentary ===
Year	Title	Role	Notes	Ref.
2025	Yuta Tamamori Mode	Himself	Amazon Prime Video; worldwide distribution	

=== Japanese Dub ===
Year	Title	Role	Notes	Ref.
2016	Gods of Egypt	Bek		
2023	Elemental	Wade Ripple		

== Stage ==
=== Dream Boy ===
Year	Title	Role	Venue	Note	Ref.
2004	Dream Boy	a boy in a wheelchair	Imperial Theatre		
2006	Dream Boys		Imperial Theatre		
2007	Dream Boys		Imperial Theatre		
2008	Dream Boys		Imperial Theatre		
2012	Dream Boys	Yuta (Champ)	Imperial Theatre	Semi-leading role	
2013	Dream Boys Jet	Tamamori	Imperial Theatre	Leading role	
2014	Dream Boys	Yuta	Imperial Theatre	Leading role	
2015	Dream Boys	Yuta	Imperial Theatre	Leading role	
2016	Dream Boys	Yuta	Imperial Theatre	Leading role	
2018	Dream Boys	Yuta	Imperial Theatre	Leading role	

=== Other Stage Plays ===
Year	Title	Role	Venue	Note	Ref.
2006	Takizawa Enbujo		Shinbashi Enbujō		
2006	One! -the history of Tackey		Nissay Theatre		
2009	Shinshun Takizawa kakumei		Imperial Theatre		
2009	Playzone'09 A Letter from the Sun	Yuta Tamamori	Aoyama Theatre	Leading role	
2010	Shinshun Takizawa kakumei		Imperial Theatre		
2010	Shinshun Jinsei kakumei		Imperial Theatre		
2010	Boys: Prison without Bars		Nissay Theatre	It was a stage in which Kis-My-Ft2 (five members except Yokoo and Nikaido) and A.B.C-Z performed as the lead actors.	
2016	Johnny's All Stars Island		Imperial Theatre	Appeared with Taisuke Fujigaya from Kis-My-Ft2	

== Discography ==
For Yuta Tamamori's discography as a member of Kis-My-Ft2, see Kis-My-Ft2#Discography.

=== Solo and small group songs ===
Song title	Lyric	Composer	Name	Album	Note
Solo songs
"Yume wo Boku to Tomoni"	Yoji Kubota	James Ting	Yuta Tamamori and M.A.D.	PLAYZONE 2009 -Letters from the Sun- Original Soundtrack Included	
"Only One..."	Yuta Tamamori, Kelly	Daichi, Carlos Okabe	Yuta Tamamori	Included in Kis-My-Journey	
"Alive"	Sunny boy	Chris Wahle	Yuta Tamamori	I Scream (Limited 4cups version)	"Alive" (Live ver.) on YouTube
"Camellia"	MiNE	Andreas Ohrn, Henrik Smith, MiNE	Yuta Tamamori	Music Colosseum (Normal Edition)	
"Survivor"	Komu	Steven Lee, Chris Wahle	Yuta Tamamori	Dream Boys(2016) [Limited First Edition] Included on bonus CD	
"Crazy My Dream"	ma-saya	Susumu Kawaguchi, Raay	Yuta Tamamori	Dream Boys(2016) [Limited First Edition] Included in bonus CD	
"Clap-A-Holics"	Sunny Boy	Steven Lee, Xisco, Drew Ryan Scott, Susumu Kawaguchi	Yuta Tamamori	Yummy!! Included in Normal Edition	
"Love Story"	Dai Hirai, Eigo	Dai Hirai	Yuta Tamamori	Included in Free Hugs!	
"Share Love"	Akira Kurihara (Jazzin' Park)	Akira Kurihara (Jazzin' Park), Tasuku Maeda	Yuta Tamamori	Included in "Live Tour 2021 Home" (Normal Edition) bonus CD "Kis-My-Ft2 10th Anniversary Extra CD"	"Share Love" music video on official YouTube
"T song 1〜CAN TRY"	h-wonder	h-wonder	Yuta Tamamori	Included in "Live Tour 2021 Home" (Normal Edition) bonus CD "Kis-My-Ft2 10th Anniversary Extra CD"	
"Dinga"	Jun	Andreas Ohrn, Christffer Lauridsen, Simon Gribbe	Yuta Tamamori	"Live Tour 2021 Home" (Normal Edition) bonus CD "Kis-My-Ft2 10th Anniversary Extra CD".	
Small group songs
"Kickin'it"	Komu	Niclas Molinder・Joacim Persson・Johan Alkenas・Dryu Lian Scott	Hiromitsu Kitayama, Taisuke Fujigaya, Yuta Tamamori	1st album Kis-My-1st	
"Sing for you"	Tateshi Ueda・Hiroya.T	Dr Hardcastle・youwhich・Daichi	Yuta Tamamori, Toshiya Miyata, Kento Senga	1st album Kis-My-1st	
"Forza!"	Hikari	Hikari，Stephan Elfgren	Yuta Tamamori with Wataru Yokoo, Toshiya Miyata, Takashi Nikaido, Kento Senga	2nd album Good Ikuze!	
"Rocking Party"	HusiQ.K・T.Fxxx	Stephan Elfgren	Hiromitsu Kitayama, Taisuke Fujigaya, Yuta Tamamori	2nd album Good Ikuze!	
"Be Love"	miyakei	youwhich・L-m-T	Yuta Tamamori, Toshiya Miyata	4th album Kis-My-World Part 1 of the "Be Love" trilogy	
"Touch"	Komei Kobayashi	Andreas Ohrn，Christoffer Lauridsen	Taisuke Fujigaya, Tamamori Yuta	Single "Sha la la Summer Time" (Normal Edition), later sung as an insert song in "Bokura no Music Colosseum", included in the 6th album Music Colosseum (First Press Limited Edition B)".	
"Without Your Love"	Emi K	Takarot, Lidbom Eric Gustaf	Taisuke Fujigaya and Yuta Tamamori	Performed on stage "Johnnys' All Stars Island". Jasrac work code: 1K0-0073-6	
"Next Dream" (Opening Ver.)	J.hamai	Sebastian Fronda，Michael Clauss，Thomas Thornholm	Yuta Tamamori, Toshiya Miyata, Kento Senga	Included in DVD Dream Boys(2016) (First Press Limited Edition)	
"Zero"	Riako Tsukioka	Kento Takeda，Christofer Erixon，SHIKATA	Hiromitsu Kitayama, Taisuke Fujigaya and Yuta Tamamori	Included in the special single "You & Me"	
"Wish Upon a Star"	YU-G	YU-G，Jun Suyama	Yuta Tamamori and Toshiya Miyata	Included in the 21st single "Love" (Regular Edition). Part 2 of the "Be Love" trilogy	
"#No!No!"	Shingo Asari	Shingo Asari	Yuta Tamamori and Takashi Nikaido	Included in 9th album To-y2 (Regular Edition)	
"Destiny"	YU-G	Noriyasu Agematsu	Toshiya Miyata & Yuta Tamamori	Included in 9th album To-y2 (Regular Edition). Part 3 of the "Be Love" trilogy.	Live Tour 2020 To-y2 digest of small group songs
"Shindo"	Yoshifumi Kanamaru	Kanata Okajima, Hayato Yamamoto, pw.a	Yuta Tamamori and Toshiya Miyata	Single "Curtain Call"	

== Awards and nominations ==
Year	Work	Award	Category	Result	Refs
2011	He is Beautiful	The 15th Nikkan Sports Drama Grand Prix (GP)	Best Actor	Nominated	
2013	A Chef of Nobunaga	82nd The Television Drama Academy Awards	Best Actor	Nominated	
2015	Youth Detective Haruya	87nd The Television Drama Academy Awards	Best Actor	Nominated	
2017	Reverse	TV Station Drama Awards 2017	Best Supporting Actor	Won	
2017	Key Person of Interest Detective	95th The Television Drama Academy Awards	Best Actor	Nominated	
2019	La Grande Maison Tokyo	103rd The Television Drama Academy Awards	Best Supporting Actor	Won	
2019	La Grande Maison Tokyo	29th TV Life Annual Drama Awards	Best Supporting Actor	Won	
2021	Oh My Boss! Love Not Included	107th The Television Drama Academy Awards	Best Supporting Actor	Nominated	
2022	Nice Flight!	113th The Television Drama Academy Awards	Best Actor	Nominated	
2022	VOCE Best Cosmetics Award 2022 Special Award	Most Beautiful Person	Yuta Tamamori	Won	

== Public and promotional activities ==
=== Public activities ===
==== Cartier ====
- (November 23, 2021) Selected as one of the Cartier Friend of the Maison.
- (April 7, 2022) Attended Sixième Sens par Cartier high jewelry event in Kyoto, Japan.
- (September 2–19, 2022) Appeared at the Panthère de Cartier pop-up in Omotesandō, Tokyo.
- (October 30, 2024) Attended the Trinity 100 Celebration Party held at Japan National Stadium, marking the 100th anniversary of Cartier's Trinity line; also narrated the Trinity 100 pop-up exhibition in Omotesandō, Tokyo.
- (September 18, 2025) Attended the opening event of the Cartier Ginza 4-chome Boutique, Tokyo.
- (October 22 – November 3, 2025) Served as the audio guide narrator for the immersive exhibition Into the Wild, exploring the history and creative world of the Maison's iconic Panthère, held at Maison de Panthère, the former Cartier Ginza 2-chome boutique.
- (December 2025) Appeared as a Friend of the Maison at Cartier's holiday pop-up The Art of Gifting in Ginza, Tokyo.
- (April 2026) Featured in Cartier’s visual series for the Clash de Cartier collection, highlighting the theme of inner beauty through symbolic jewelry.

==== Lancôme ====
- (February 8, 2021) Appeared at the Lancôme Clarifique Dual Essence Lotion 1st Anniversary Press Conference.
- (March 1, 2022) Appointed ambassador "Mr. Clarifique" for Clarifique Dual Essence.

==== Brunello Cucinelli ====
- (February 26, 2025) Attended the Brunello Cucinelli Fall/Winter 2025 Women's Collection presentation at Milan Fashion Week.
- (October 21, 2025) Attended the Spring/Summer 2026 fashion presentation held at the Residence of the Italian Ambassador in Tokyo – marking Brunello Cucinelli’s first visit to Japan in nine years. He was seated in the front row alongside Ken Watanabe and other notable guests.

==== Bottega Veneta ====
- (March 28, 2024) Attended the opening reception of Bottega Veneta and Photographer Alec Soth’s Photo Exhibition "Tokyo Playtime" with Taisuke Fujigaya.
- (September 27, 2025) Attended the Bottega Veneta Spring/Summer 2026 show at Milan Fashion Week, seated in the front row.
- (September 26, 2026) Attended the Bottega Veneta Spring/Summer 2027 show at Milan Fashion Week, seated in the front row.

==== AMIRI ====
- (June 20, 2024) Attended the Amiri Menswear Spring/Summer 2025 fashion show at Paris Fashion Week, seated in the front row.

==== Dolce and Gabbana ====
- (April 6, 2024) Attended the opening of From the Heart to the Hands: Dolce & Gabbana exhibition in Milan, Italy.

=== Commercials ===
- Nature Lab Co., Ltd. – "LAVONS" (From 2014 to 2026) – liquid fabric conditioner etc.
- Line – "Line Poko Poko" (LINE ポコポコ) – (2016 with Toshiya Miyata)
- Unicharm – flooring wiper "Wave" (From October 2019 to 2021)
- Manyo Factory Corp. – as "Ma:nyo" brand ambassador (From August 2024 to 2025)

=== Events ===
- Off Mode, a worldwide streaming–release commemorative event for Yuta Tamamori Mode — Osaka on January 26, 2025; Tokyo on January 28, 2025.

=== Social media and online activities ===
- Official Instagram was opened on January 10, 2023.
- After School Gaming Life – (The title was changed from "Johnny's Gaming Room" Oct. 2023) – (December 16, 2021 -) – Tamamori serves as one of the main host members along with Toshiya Miyata and Daiki Arioka.
