= Yuta Tamamori Mode =

2025 Japanese documentary series about Yuta Tamamori

- 玉森裕太 MODE
- Genre: Documentary
- Directed by: Raito Amaya
- Starring: Yuta Tamamori
- Country of origin: Japan
- Original language: Japanese
- No. of seasons: 1
- No. of episodes: 1

Production
- Producers: Kota Shimamoto; Tomoko Izuta
- Editor: Akiko Yamada
- Running time: 78 minutes
- Production company: Storm Labels

Original release
- Network: Amazon Prime Video
- Release: December 1, 2025

Yuta Tamamori Mode (Japanese: 玉森裕太 MODE) is a documentary series that premiered on Amazon Prime Video on December 1, 2025. The program follows Japanese singer and actor Yuta Tamamori for over a year, documenting his involvement in producing concert costumes for Kis-My-Ft2, as well as his overseas activities related to fashion, including visits to international fashion events.

== Overview ==
Since 2018, Tamamori has been involved in designing and producing stage costumes for live performances by Kis-My-Ft2.

The documentary focuses on the costume production process for the Kis-My-Ft2 Dome Tour 2024 Synopsis and the Kis-My-Ft2 Live Tour 2025 Magfact, covering stages from initial planning through completion. It depicts trial-and-error in the production process and collaboration with staff.

The series also records Tamamori's participation in fashion weeks in Paris and Milan, where he observed the work of international designers, as well as his visit to Seoul, South Korea, to select fabrics and costume materials.

Among the costumes featured are designs embellished with approximately 3,000 stones and outfits incorporating safety pins, both of which were presented during the Kis-My-Ft2 Dome Tour 2024 Synopsis. According to the documentary, many aspects of the production, including the sewing of stones, were carried out manually by staff, and work on certain costumes continued until shortly before live performances.

The program also portrays Tamamori's efforts to balance costume production with other professional commitments, including physical training and dietary management for his role in the television drama I Wanna Punch That Scumbag!.

In interviews cited by Japanese media outlets such as Oricon, Tamamori commented on his approach to creative work, describing effort as “doing a lot and being rewarded just a little.” The documentary presents his reflections on creativity and self-expression as he reached the age of 35.

== Promotion ==
Prior to the release, the Storm FILM official X (formerly Twitter) account conducted a countdown campaign titled “#Tamamode Release Countdown,” posting photographs of Tamamori at several intervals leading up to the premiere.

Following the release, an Advent calendar-style campaign titled “#Tamamode Words Advent Calendar” was carried out until Christmas, featuring daily quotations from Tamamori included in the documentary.

Promotional trailer videos in 60-second, 30-second, and 15-second versions were released on the official Storm FILM YouTube channel. Commercial videos for the documentary were also distributed on Amazon Prime Video.

Tamamori additionally appeared in interviews for fashion and television magazines in connection with the promotion of the series, including TV Guide Person, The Television, Nylon Japan, Gianna, Barfout!, and UOMO.

== Staff ==
(as listed in the end credits):

- Starring: Yuta Tamamori
- Composition: Yuji Mohara
- Cinematography: Ryotaro Ito, Do Seung-hun, Im Kang-seop, Hiroki Kondo, Motoki Ichikawa
- Editing: Akiko Yamada
- Sound Effects: Manami Kaneko
- Coordinator: Chang-min Im
- Publicity / Associate Producer: Sakiko Seki
- Director: Raito Amaya
- Producers: Kota Shimamoto, Tomoko Izuta
- Production Cooperation: Slow Hand
- Planning and Production: Storm Labels
