= Be Love (TV series) =

2020 Japanese drama television series

- Genre: Romance drama; Boys love
- Screenplay by: Masashi Suwa
- Directed by: Masashi Suwa
- Starring: Yuta Tamamori; Toshiya Miyata
- Opening theme: "Be Love" by Kis-My-Ft2 (Yuta Tamamori & Toshiya Miyata)
- Country of origin: Japan
- Original language: Japanese
- No. of seasons: 1
- No. of episodes: 4

Production
- Running time: 20 minutes
- Production companies: dTV (Lemino); Wins moment Co.Ltd.

Original release
- Network: dTV (Lemino)
- Release: October 16 – November 6, 2020

Related
- Plesure Instration; ConeXtion

Be Love is a Japanese streaming drama series starring Yuta Tamamori and Toshiya Miyata that aired on dTV (Lemino) from October 16 to November 6, 2020. The catch phrase is, "We'll stay like this forever".

This work is a drama based on three of the "trilogy" of songs the two sang in Kis-My-Ft2: "Be Love," "Wish Upon a Star," and "Destiny," with Tamamori and Miyata supervising the script and also performing in the drama themselves. This “trilogy” was originally about marriage, bereavement, and jealousy, and the script for this drama follows suit.

== Background ==
This drama was one of the dramas produced as part of a drama project within Kis-My-Ft2's regular variety show "Kis-My Doki Doki". In addition to this drama starring Miyata and Tamamori, two other dramas were produced: romantic comedy drama“Pleasure Installation” starring Takashi Nikaido and Hiromitsu Kitayama, and “ConneXion”, a drama about finding a marriage partner starring Wataru Yokoo, Taisuke Fujigaya, and Kento Senga. dTV distributed this dramas, but these dramas would not be available as of 2024 because dTV ended its service in the spring of 2022 and the service has since been replaced by Lemino.

== For dramatization ==
The project was born out of a desire to deliver a project that would surprise fans. Tamamori said, “Originally, I only thought of it as a concert production, but now that I have made it into a video, what I had delivered only as an image of the song has taken shape and become easier to understand, and I think it has added an element that fans who support the duo of Tamamori and Miyata can also enjoy." Miyata said, "I have been in the entertainment industry for 20 years, but this was the most shocking job I have ever had. I was genuinely moved that a song could be turned into a drama. The location was beautiful and so were the images." Although they both appear as themselves, they dare not call each other by name in the drama to make it clear that it is a fictional drama and to avoid viewer confusion. For Miyata, this drama was the first kissing scene he played.

== Promotion ==
This drama was actively promoted by dTV (Lemino). A large billboard advertising the drama was placed in front of Shibuya Station, Tokyo, and a TV commercial starring the two leads was also aired. In the TV commercial, the two embraced and attempted to lock lips, and Tamamori's shower scene was also aired. On Twitter, viewers were encouraged to use hashtags to promote the program, as a result, it became the world's number one trending topic. and on Instagram, an “official behind-the-scenes account” was created to show the daily life of the picture book writer who appears in the play, and the content of the posts changed along with the distribution. An "advance premiere distribution" of this work was also held from 10:00 p.m. on October 15, the day before the start of distribution. The main visual, which became the poster, was shot with a bed on the beach. The pure love between the two was expressed in a unified white worldview against the backdrop of the glowing evening sea.

== Synopsis ==
Episode 1
A picture book author, Tamamori (himself), and his editor, Miyata (himself), come to Miyata's villa by the sea to work on a new picture book. In fact, they are lovers who love each other beyond the relationship between author and editor. During an evening spent alone at the villa, Miyata tells Tamamori that he may be assigned to a newcomer, and Tamamori becomes jealous. Later, as Tamamori works late into the night, he has a strange dream.
Episode 2
Tamamori spent happy times alone with Miyata while continuing to work on the picture book. One day, he came up with the idea of preparing to celebrate Miyata's birthday without telling him. He was about to receive the birthday cake he had asked for while Miyata was out at work. That day, Miyata had a bad feeling and hug Tamamori before leaving. A short time after Miyata left for work, his cell phone rang. It was the news that Tamamori had died.
Episode 3
Miyata returned to the villa exhausted. When he opened the door, Tamamori had decorated the room and prepared a present to celebrate his birthday. Miyata remembers their past. Miyata is alone in his grief, but Tamamori is actually by his side. Even after his death, Tamamori could not leave Miyata's side. Tamamori told Miyata, "I will always be by your side". However, Miyata could not hear it.
Episode 4
Miyata meets Takeda, a new female picture book writer, at a bar he used to frequent with Tamamori. Miyata sees Tamamori in Takeda's image and decides to have Takeda draw a continuation of the picture book that Tamamori was only able to complete halfway through. However, when Miyata invites Takeda to his villa and the two begin working on a picture book together, Tamamori became jealous and started to get angry. Then, when Miyata brought thing related to the last scene of the picture book that Tamamori had drawn in advance, Tamamori, who was supposed to be dead, appeared before Miyata.

== Characters ==
A picture book writer acted by Yuta Tamamori
The protagonist of this work. An intuitive picture book writer. He is not good at cooking. He loves the editor very much and gets jealous easily.
An Editor acted by Toshiya Miyata
The protagonist of this work. He is the editor in charge of a picture book writer. He is good at cooking. He loves the picture book writer and sometimes gets into fights with him because he takes care of him too much.
Ms.Takeda acted by Shen Tanaka
New picture book writer. Her style is a little like that of dead picture book writer.

== Public reaction ==
The series ranked sixth in the annual ratings rankings for 2020. The kiss scene between the guys also became a topic of conversation.

== Episodes ==
| No. | Date | Subtitle |
|---|---|---|
| 1 | October 16, 2020 | Be Love, A sweet and sad foreboding of two people in love. |
| 2 | October 23, 2020 | Wish upon a star, surrounded by sparkling time. |
| 3 | October 30, 2020 | Destiny, I want to go back to the day we sang that song. |
| 4 | November 6, 2020 | Be Love, We will be together forever. |

== Staff ==
- Director Masashi Suwa
- Screenplay Masashi Suwa
  - Tamamori and Miyata participated in the script as supervisors.
- Theme song "Be love" by Yuta Tamamori and Toshiya Miyata of Kis-My-Ft2
- Company dTV(Lemino), Wins moment Co.Ltd.

== Trilogy songs ==
"Be love," "Wish Upon a Star," and "Destiny," were performed by Yuta Tamamori and Toshiya Miyata.
