= Oh My Boss! Love Not Included =

2021 romantic drama from Japan

- Japanese: オー!マイ・ボス!恋は別冊で
- Genre: Drama; romantic comedy; romantic drama
- Screenplay by: Shigenori Tanabe
- Directed by: Kenta Tanaka; Yasuharu Ishii; Takeyoshi Yamamoto; Taichi Imura
- Starring: Mone Kamishiraishi
- Music by: Hideakira Kimura
- Opening theme: "Luv Bias" by Kis-My-Ft2
- Country of origin: Japan
- Original language: Japanese
- No. of episodes: 10

Production
- Producer: Akiko Matsumoto
- Running time: 54min.
- Production companies: TBS Television, TBS Sparkle

Original release
- Network: TBS Television
- Release: 12 January – 16 March 2021

Related
- Oh! My Tsundere! Love Is a Separate Volume

Oh My Boss! Love not included (Japanese: オー!マイ・ボス!恋は別冊で, Hepburn: Oh mai bosu koi wa bessatsu de) is a Japanese romantic comedy drama that was broadcast on TBS Television from 12 January to 16 March 2021, starred Mone Kamishiraishi.

This drama was produced by the production staff of TBS Television (Japan)'s romantic drama An Incurable Case of Love, which was highly rated in the January 2020 season with Mone Kamishiraishi playing a rookie nurse. It has no original story and is an original script by Shigenori Tanabe, who wrote the script for the An Incurable Case of Love spin-off drama.

The drama, which depicts a young woman's work and love life, was well received by viewers and maintained a high average rating of over 10%, with the final episode recording the highest rating of 13.2%.

== On Filming the Drama ==
Prior to the drama's broadcast, producer Akiko Matsumoto said, "Mone Kamishiraishi is leading the production with her outstanding comedienne skills. Nanao expresses a cool boss just by standing still. We asked Yuta Tamamori to play the difficult role of “a man like a puppy” this time, but he has turned out to be a puppy 120% of the time and is very cute,” she said.

The “puppy-like man” appears as Nami imagines him to be, but Tamamori appears with ears and tail like a dog.

Nanao, the editor-in-chief of a fashion magazine, spends about 1 million yen per pose each time she appears, and her outfits are chosen by a stylist. In episode 4, he even wore jewelry that cost over 10 million yen.

The sets and props in the editorial office are also carefully selected. The cover of the first issue of the magazine depicted in the first episode was done by Leslie Kee, a photographer who actually shoots fashion magazine covers. Such attention to detail is also a highlight of the drama.

== Differences from The Devil Wears Prada ==
Immediately after the show began airing, some criticized Nami and Reiko for looking too much like Andrea “Andy” Sachs, played by Anne Hathaway, and Miranda Priestly, played by Meryl Streep, in the film The Devil Wears Prada.

However, also incorporated into this drama is the fact that Japan is experiencing a severe publishing slump and many magazines have been discontinued in recent years, and Reiko, the editor-in-chief, is depicted as obsessed with how to collect advertising revenue for her magazine. This was something not seen in the editor-in-chief of The Devil Wears Prada.

The other axis of this drama is a love story, and the portrayal of the main character, who is heartbroken by a childhood friend, who happens to meet Junnosuke, the son of a wealthy family, who loves her wholeheartedly, and also has feelings for her from Nakazawa, a senior at work, is somewhat fantastical, but as a result, the story won the hearts of many women. This is different from the love story between Miranda and Nate in The Devil Wears Prada.

Despite being called a drama with a sense of deja vu, it was well received and maintained high viewer ratings. The highest viewer rating was achieved in the final episode, in which the main character achieves self-realization in her editing job and her love with Junnosuke is fulfilled.

== Synopsis ==
Nami Suzuki (Mone Kamishiraishi) was an ordinary woman who thought that normal was the best way to do everything. She had a crush on and wanted to marry her childhood friend Kenya, so she moved to Tokyo from her native Kumamoto and planned to have a job interview in the facilities management department of a publishing company.

However, she met Junnosuke (Yuta Tamamori) on a bridge. The bench there had a fresh coat of paint on it, and she sat down and soiled the clothes she was wearing for the job interview. She lamented that she would not be able to go to the interview. Junnosuke then bought her luxury brand clothes and gave her a luxury brand bracelet he wore as a good-luck charm.

After the interview, she was appointed not to the facilities management department but to the editorial department of a fashion magazine as an assistant to the editor-in-chief, Reiko Horai (Nanao), who had just returned from Paris. Beautiful and able to do her job, Reiko's assistant was fiercely busy and she grumbles. However, Reiko reprimanded Nami for not taking her job seriously.

When Nami met Junnosuke again, he asked her to meet his elder sister and pretend to be his girlfriend. However, the sister was Reiko, the editor-in-chief. Their father was the president of a large company and came from a wealthy family.

At first, Nami thought that normal was good for everything, that she wanted to get married and lead a normal woman's life, but her encountered with Reiko and her colleagues in the editorial department changed her way of thinking and helped her to grow as a member of society. And through her romance with Junnosuke, she grows into an adult woman.

== Character ==
Nami Suzuki (age 23) – Mone Kamishiraishi
Protagonist. Stability-oriented person who "wants to have a normal, ordinary happiness like other people."
Born in Kumamoto Prefecture. She chases after her childhood friend Kenya, whom she has a crush on. And she had interviews for a job in the equipment management department of Otowado Publishing, a major publishing house in Tokyo, but is assigned to the editorial department of the fashion magazine MIYAVI.
Reiko Horai – Nanao
Youngest editor-in-chief of fashion magazine MIYAVI.
At the young age of 30, she became the first Japanese editor-in-chief in Europe of the fashion magazine Marie Claire. She was headhunted by Ugajin and returned from Paris for the launch of MIYAVI. In addition to her well-groomed appearance and outstanding style, she is a career woman with a strong sense of responsibility for her work. She is a strong-willed career woman, but shy in love and has a faint crush on Ugajin.
Junnosuke Horai – Yuta Tamamori
The son of the president of a major paper company and freelance photographer.
He has a fateful encounter with Nami on the bridge. He asks Nami to pretend to be his lover and meet his sister Reiko. After becoming lovers with Nami, he loved her single-mindedly and was often described in Nami's fantasies as "a lover as gentle and obedient as a puppy".
Ryota Nakazawa – Shotaro Mamiya
Editorial staff member of MIYAVI.
He is stoic about his work as an editor and is often shunned by Nami and Haruka because of his harsh words. However, contrary to his words, he is actually considerate and caring.
Shinichi Ugajin – Yūsuke Santamaria
Vice-president of Otowado Publishing. He is a brilliant man full of leadership skills and headhunts Reiko.
Haruka Izumi – Sayu Kubota
Deputy editor-in-chief of MIYAVI. She aspires to become a member of the editorial staff of a fashion magazine and sees working under Reiko as an opportunity.
Rio Hasumi – Kana Kurashina
Former lover of Junnosuke. Professional violinist active abroad.
Ichita Oashi – Asei (Miki)
Exclusive camera assistant to Junnosuke. Respects Junnosuke. Born in Osaka.
Shonosuke Horai – Takashi Ukaji
Father of Junnosuke and Reiko. Head of the Horai Group.

== Staff ==
- Screenplay – Shigenori Tanabe
- Production – Akiko Matsumoto
- Direction – Kenta Tanaka, Yasuharu Ishii, Takeyoshi Yamamoto, Taichi Imura
- Organiser – Masako Miyazaki
- Music – Hideakira Kimura
- Theme song – "Luv Bias" by Kis-My-Ft2 (Avex Trax)
- Script supervisor – Emi Sugiyama
- Photography supervisor – Yusuke Takeda
- Photography supervisor – Ryota Haraguchi
- Kumamoto dialect instruction – Emika Nakahara
- French and English language instruction – Free Wave
- Production – TBS Sparkle Ltd., TBS Television (Japan)

== Broadcast schedule ==
	Date	Subtitle	Director	Rating
#1	12 January 2021	An ordinary girl becomes a scullery maid for a devil boss!	Kenta Tanaka	11.4%
#2	19 January 2021	Operation Fool the Boss with a Fake Girlfriend!	Kenta Tanaka	11.3%
#3	26 January 2021	A big upheaval with demon bosses vs. subordinates!	Yasuharu Ishii	11.0%
#4	2 February 2021	Love at the barbecue!	Takeyoshi Yamamoto	11.6%
#5	9 February 2021	Are we lovers?	Kenta Tanaka	10.8%
#6	16 February 2021	Graduated from being a scullery maid-like assistant? Living with a man who is like a puppy?	Yasuharu Ishii	11.8%
#7	23 February 2021	A reversal of fortune! I love you more than anything in the world!	Taichi Imura	11.4%
#8	2 March 2021	10 things I want to do when I get a boyfriend.	Kenta Tanaka	11.8%
#9	9 March 2021	I love you... I want to be with you!	Yasuharu Ishii	12.0%
#10	16 March 2021	Someday the future will be...	Kenta Tanaka	13.2%
Average rating 11.6% (ratings are from Video Research, Kanto region, households, real time).

== Public response ==
- The number of views of the drama's first missed episode (total views on TVer (streaming service), TBS FREE and GyaO!) reached approximately 2.21 million in one week, making it the second most viewed drama of all time in the TBS Tuesday drama slot.
- The show received a strong response, recording a rating of 11.4% from the first episode, making it the first double-digit start for two films in the same slot, and ranking number one in global trends every week.
- This drama was voted No. 1 in "the Model Press" readers' list of the most addictive dramas of winter 2021.
- In the January (January-March) programme views ranking of TVer (streaming service), the official commercial TV portal, it broke the record for the highest number of views in the service's history held by "An Incurable Case of Love", coming in first place with 18.65 million views, a massive 3 million views ahead of second place.

=== Bridge setting ===
The bridge that was an important setting for the scene where Nami and Junnosuke meet and reunite is the Nakame Park Bridge over the Meguro River in Meguro, Tokyo. There are actually no benches on this bridge, and benches were brought in for the filming. In 2024, Yuta Tamamori who played Junnosuke, visited this location and introduced it on his Instagram, which became internet news.

=== Awards ===
- 107th The Television Drama Academy Awards - Best Supporting Actress Award - Nanao
- Drama Song Award – "Luv Bias" by Kis-My-Ft2 (Avex Trax)

== Oh! My Tsundere! Love Is a Separate Volume ==
Oh! My Tsundere! Love is a Separate Volume is spin-off drama of Oh! My Boss! Love is a Separate Volume. (Note: "Tsundere" means poker face and refers to someone who appears cool but is actually caring and kind.) It was distributed on the Paravi distribution service after the main drama had finished. The story depicts a love affair between two contrasting characters: editorial assistant Haruka Izumi, who has the worst first impression of senior editor Ryota Nakazawa, and editor Kazumi Wada, who fell in love with Nakazawa on the first day they met, and the "Tsundere" poker-faced guy Nakazawa.

=== Main cast ===
- Ryota Nakazawa – Shotaro Mamiya
- Haruka Izumi – Satoru Kubota
- Kazumi Wada – Yuzuki Akiyama

=== Staff ===
- Screenplay – Takeshi Miyamoto
- Direction – Taichi Imura, Naoki Kato
- Music – Hideakira Kimura
- Producer – Akiko Matsumoto
- Planning – Masako Miyazaki
- Production – TBS Sparkle Ltd., TBS Television (Japan)

=== Streaming schedule ===
	Date	Subtitle	Director
#1	12 January 2021	The "best" love in the world begins.	Taichi Imura
#2	19 January 2021	I love what I love!	Naoki Kato
#3	26 January 2021	Cycling for love is a dangerous love triangle!	Taichi Imura
#4	9 February 2021	Valentine's Day for unrequited loves.	Naoki Kato
#5	23 February 2021	We don't give up even if it's black and white!	Naoki Kato
#6	9 March 2021	If you can't push, try pulling!	Naoki Kato
#7	16 March 2021	Happy ending?	Naoki Kato
