= Parallel World Love Story =

1995 novel by Keigo Higashino

- Author: Keigo Higashino
- Language: Japanese
- Genre: Novel
- Publisher: Chuokoron-Shinsha, Kodansha
- Publication date: 1 February 1995 (book); 13 March 1998
- Publication place: Japan
- Pages: 345
- ISBN: 978-4120024009
- Website: kodansha

Parallel World Love Story is a novel by Keigo Higashino.

The book was published in book form by Chuokoron-Shinsha on 1 February 1995, and in paperback by Kodansha on 13 March 1998. This work is a best-selling novel with a total circulation of over 1.5 million copies.

The novel was adapted into a film in May 2019.

== Synopsis ==
Takashi Tsuruga once had a woman whom he saw from the train and fell in love at first sight. One day, when he met his best friend Tomohiko, he was introduced to his girlfriend. That lover was Mayuko, the woman Takashi fell in love with at first sight. Takashi is intensely jealous of Tomohiko. One day, however, he realizes that Mayuko is his girlfriend. Takashi is torn between two world lines, wondering if it is a dream or reality.

== Main characters ==
Takashi Tsuruga
He works for Vitec Corporation, a general computer manufacturer. He is currently enrolled at MAC Technical College, a research and educational institution of the same company as Tomohiko.
Tomohiko Miwa
He and Takashi were together from junior high school to graduate school and are best friends. He has a bad leg and is introverted. He is smart and sharp. Enrolled in MAC Technical College.
Mayuko Tsuno
Beautiful woman. She is a researcher at MAC Technical College. She is Tomohiko's lover and Takashi's lover at the same time.

== Bibliographic information ==
- Pallarel world love story by Keigo Higashino
  - Book: Published by Chuokoron-Shinsha on February 1, 1995. ISBN 978-4120024009.
  - Paperback: Published by Kodansha on 13 March 1998. ISBN 978-4-06-263725-1

== Film adaptation ==
The film Parallel World Love Story was released on 31 May 2019, distributed by Shochiku. The leading role is played by Yuta Tamamori. The theme song is “A Life to be Jealous of” by Hikaru Utada.

This work was said to be difficult to visualize, but according to director Yoshitaka Mori, he expressed two different worlds in which Takashi wanders into, each filmed in a different way. Mori also said that he created two separate scripts for each of the two films, and then combined them into a single film.

During filming, Yuta Tamamori, the lead actor, was instructed by director Mori to play the role with the feeling of giving everything you have. Therefore, Tamamori poured all his energy into the role, saying, "I have no choice but to play the role with the will to die." Mori also requested Tamamori that he face himself and look at himself again. So Tamamori looked back on his life from his upbringing to the present, itemized the differences between himself and Takashi, and said that he tried to create the role while thinking about the differences.

Shota Sometani, who played Tomohiko, said that he played the role with the importance of his love for Takashi as his best friend above all. Tomohiko and Takashi are best friends, but there are many scenes in the film where the two clash. Sometani and Tamamori even discussed the theme of "what is a best friend" before filming.

Riho Yoshioka, who played Mayuko, said that since the film was based on a work that was said to be difficult to visualize, the script was difficult to follow, and that is why the director was so strict and she played the role with the feeling of fighting with the director every time.

According to the June 3, 2019 Movie Audience Ranking (according to Kogyo Tsushinsha), this film ranked fourth with approximately 112,000 visitors and 143 million yen in box office revenue over the two days of Saturday and Sunday (June 1 and 2, 2019).

=== Synopsis ===
Takashi Tsuruga graduated at the top of his graduate school class and joined Vitec, a company that conducts cutting-edge research. While conducting research with Tomohiko Miwa, his best friend since junior high school, he and Mayuko Tsuno, a junior colleague, became lovers. However, one day he woke up to find that Mayuko was Tomohiko's girlfriend. Tomohiko was in love with a woman whom Takashi felt in love with at first sight on the train. As he woke up in different world lines, Takashi became confused as to which world is the real one.

=== Characters ===
Takashi Tsuruga by Yuta Tamamori
The protagonist of this work. He is good looking and smart. He once saw Mayuko on a train and fell in love with her at first sight. Tomohiko has been his best friend since junior high school. He is confused as to whether Mayuko is actually his or Tomohiko's lover.
Mayuko Tsuno by Riho Yoshioka
A beautiful woman. She is a researcher at Vitec and Takashi's junior colleague. She is a mysterious woman who does not say much.
Tomohiko Miwa by Shota Sometani
A researcher at Vitec and Takashi's best friend since junior high school. He has a bad leg. He is very smart.

=== Related products ===
- DVD/Blu-ray
  - Luxury Edition (One full-length movie and one bonus disc)
    - Blu-ray (VPXT-71768)/DVD (VPBT-14881), VAP, Inc.
      - Special Video Features
        - Making of the film
        - Behind the scenes of "Parallel World Love Story" as told by director Yoshitaka Mori
        - Greetings from the stage and events
        - Unreleased Scenes
        - Spots and trailers
        - Included extras (tentative)
        - Special booklet
  - Regular Edition (One full-length movie and one bonus disc)
    - Blu-ray (VPBT-14882)/DVD (VPBT-14881), VAP, Inc.
      - Special Video Features
        - Spots and trailers
- Original sound track
  - Original soundtrack for the movie Parallel World Love Story(SOST-10359 - Goro Yasukawa, Sony Music Entertainment Japan
