= Gokusen: The Movie =

2009 Japanese film

- Theatrical poster
- ごくせん The Movie
- Directed by: Tōya Satō
- Screenplay by: Michiru Egashira; Yūko Matsuda
- Based on: Kozueko Morimoto
- Starring: Yukie Nakama; Kazuya Kamenashi; Yuya Takaki; Haruma Miura
- Distributed by: Toho
- Release date: July 11, 2009
- Running time: 118 minutes
- Country: Japan
- Language: Japanese
- Box office: ¥3.48 billion (Japan); $33,963,369 (Japan); $154,113 (overseas)

Gokusen: The Movie (ごくせん The Movie) is a 2009 Japanese film, based on manga series Gokusen. It was directed by Tōya Satō, who also directed the live-action film version of Kaiji. This film is the sequel to the television drama Gokusen season 3, and the last of the series. This film has action, comedy and drama just like the TV series. It was released on July 11, 2009.

== Story ==
It has been seven years since Kumiko Yamaguchi, whose family is a member of yakuza group Ōedo Family, became a high school teacher. While the gap between Kumiko and the students of the 3rd grade D class at Akado Gakuin high school, where she is assigned, remains unresolved, Ryu Odagiri, a student of Kumiko's from her days at Kurogin Gakuin high school, is assigned to Akado Gakuin as a student teacher. Kumiko thinks that Ryu wanted to become a teacher because of his admiration for her, but Ryu is still brooding about his future. Meanwhile, Mochizuki and his friends from 3-D are robbed by a group of bad guys and are nearly mugged. Reita Takasugi, the leader of 3-D students, appears and defeats the bad guys, but they are members of the Black Skull, a motorcycle gang that has caused numerous police incidents, and Takasugi and his group are noticed by them. Meanwhile, a serious incident occurs among the graduates of Akado Gakuin. Ren Kazama is wanted by the police for his involvement in a methamphetamine deal and goes missing. Kumiko finds out about this and, believing in Ren's innocence, decides to search for him together with former 3-D members such as Yamato Ogata. But there is a powerful mastermind lurking behind the incident.

== Cast ==
=== Starring ===
- Yukie Nakama as Kumiko Yamaguchi
- Kazuya Kamenashi as Ryū Odagiri
- Yuya Takaki as Yamato Ogata
- Haruma Miura as Ren Kazuma

=== Co-starring ===
- Katsuhisa Namase as Gorō Sawatari
- Yuta Tamamori as Reita Takasugi
- Shun Oguri as Haruhiko Uchiyama
- Win Morisaki as Igarashi Makoto

== Reception ==
The film grossed ¥490 million in its opening weekend. According to the Motion Picture Producers Association of Japan, the film grossed ¥3.48 billion in Japan during 2009. The film also grossed $154,113 overseas in Singapore, Hong Kong and Taiwan.
