= Perfect Summer for End Credits =

Japanese novel

- Author: Ēichi Fukuda
- Language: Japanese
- Genre: Mystery fiction
- Published: May 30, 2007
- Publisher: Tokyo Sogensha
- Publication place: Japan
- Pages: 348
- Website: Perfect Summer for End Credits

Perfect Summer for End Credits (エンド・クレジットに最適な夏) is a mystery fiction novel by Ēichi Fukuda, published by Tokyo Sogensha on May 30, 2007.

Ēichi Fukuda is a Japanese mystery writer who belongs to Mystery Writers of Japan, but he also writes a wide range of mysteries as well as coming-of-age stories.

In 2015, a TV dramatization was decided and a paperback book was published on August 29 retitled Youth Detective Haruya (青春探偵ハルヤ). Under the title Youth Detective Haruya, it was adapted into a Television drama in the October 2015 season. It was announced that new episodes will be added to the dramatization while making use of the original story.

== Introduction ==
Haruya Asagi is a poor college student who works only part-time. One day, Kazuomi, a bad friend of Haruya, came to him with a request to fight off a stalker, saying that he would pay handsomely. Haruya ambushed the stalker and caught him, but it turned out to be the wrong person. The man said he was worried about his sister who lived alone and came to check on her. Haruya accepts the request of the man who loves his sister. Thereafter, Haruya struggles to solve a series of investigative requests that come in one after another in this coming-of-age mystery novel.

== Main characters ==
Haruya Asagi
Protagonist. He is a poor college student, always working hard part-time jobs such as construction work at demolition sites. One day, after solving an investigation request for a man he caught mistaking him for a stalker, he is bombarded with requests for detective-like investigations one after another.
Miu Nohmi
A female college student who attends the same college as Haruya. She was a victim of stalking.
Fuka Asagi
Haruya's younger sister. Her parents love her very much.
Kazuomi Kubodera
Haruya's bad friend. He is a rich young man.
Toshiki Shinohara
Haruya's friend. He lives with Haruya and is a strong fighter.
Aoi Sakamoto
Miu's friend. She loves Haruya.

== Bibliographic information ==
- Book
  - Perfect Summer for End Credits (May 30, 2007, Tokyo Sogensha, ISBN 978-4-488-01736-1)
- Paperback
  - Youth Detective Haruya (August 28, 2015, Tokyo Sogensha, ISBN 978-4-488-44911-7)
