= Nao (actress) =

Japanese actress

- 奈緒
- Born: February 10, 1995 (age 31); Fukuoka, Japan
- Other name: Nao Honda
- Occupation: Actress
- Years active: 2010–present
- Agent: Irving
- Website: https://irving.co.jp/talents/nao/

Nao (奈緒, Nao; born February 10, 1995) is a Japanese actress. She had been active under the name Nao Honda for about two years since 2015.

== Biography ==
Nao lost her father when she was 7 months old. She began her entertainment activities in her hometown of Fukuoka at the age of 15 and moved to Tokyo at the age of 20.

== Filmography ==
=== Film ===
Year	Title	Role	Notes	Ref.
2019	Haruka's Pottery	Haruka Koyama	Lead role	
2020	Mio's Cookbook	Noe		
2020	Eternally Younger Than Those Idiots	Kusuko Inogi		
2020	Stigmatized Properties	Azusa Kosaka		
2021	My Daddy	Ritsuko		
2021	The Sound of Grass	Junko Kudō		
2021	Your Turn to Kill: The Movie	Mikiha Ono		
2021	Sensei, Would You Sit Beside Me?	Chika Sakurada		
2022	The Last 10 Years	Sanae Fujisaki		
2022	My Broken Mariko	Mariko		
2022	Tang and Me	Rin Ōtsuki		
2023	#Manhole	Mai Kudō		
2023	Home Sweet Home	Honda		
2024	The Yin Yang Master Zero	Princess Yoshiko		
2024	Confession	Sayuri Nishida		
2024	Sensei's Pious Lie	Misuzu Hara	Lead role	
2024	Arrogance and Virtue	Mami Sakaniwa	Lead role	
2026	Why Wait, Just Die	Eiko Watarai	Lead role	
2026	Shadow Work	Kaoru	Lead role	
2027	The Blue We Touch	Mitsu	Lead role	
2027	Kasuka na Kare o Dakishimete	Kanami Hayashi	Lead role	

=== Television ===
Year	Title	Role	Notes	Ref.
2012–15	Mentai Piriri	Yayoi		
2017	Final Fantasy XIV: Dad of Light	Fujimoto		
2018	Half Blue Sky	Nao Kidahara	Asadora	
2019	Your Turn to Kill	Mikiha Ono		
2022	The First Penguin	Nodoko Iwasaki	Lead role	
2023	Even If You Don't Do It	Michi Yoshino	Lead role	
2024	When Spring Comes	Hitomi Shiina	Lead role	
2024	I Wanna Punch That Scumbag!	Hokomi Satō	Lead role	
2025	Tokyo Saladbowl	Mari Kōda	Lead role	
2025	Beauty Salon in Prison	Haru Komatsubara	Lead role; miniseries	

=== Radio ===
Year	Title	Notes	Ref.
2026	Nao no Itsuka Honto ni naru Hanashi supported by Kojima	As host	

== Awards and nominations ==
Year	Association	Award	Nominee/Work	Result	Ref.
2022	43rd Yokohama Film Festival	Best Newcomer	Eternally Younger Than Those Idiots, The Sound of Grass and My Daddy	Won	
2023	47th Elan d'or Awards	Newcomer of the Year	Herself	Won	
2024	27th Nikkan Sports Drama Grand Prix	Best Actress	Even If You Don't Do It	Won	
2025	18th Tokyo Drama Awards	Best Actress	Tokyo Saladbowl	Won	
