= A Chef of Nobunaga =

Japanese manga series

- Cover of the first manga volume

信長のシェフ (Nobunaga no Shefu)
- Genre: Historical
- Manga
- Written by: Mitsuru Nishimura
- Illustrated by: Takuro Kajikawa
- Published by: Houbunsha
- Magazine: Weekly Manga Times
- Original run: March 2011 – April 2024
- Volumes: 37

A Chef of Nobunaga (Japanese: 信長のシェフ, Hepburn: Nobunaga no Shefu) is a Japanese manga series written by Mitsuru Nishimura and illustrated by Takuro Kajikawa. It was noted to be adapted into a Japanese television drama series in January 2013. The manga was serialized in Houbunsha's Weekly Manga Times on a bi-weekly basis from March 18, 2011, to April 12, 2024.

== Plot ==
A young chef named Ken (ケン) is mysteriously transported to the Sengoku period and he also loses most of his memories. He is thrown in the midst of a battle between soldiers, and, as both sides think he is a spy, they hunt him down. During his escape, Ken meets Natsu (夏), a young blacksmith girl. Because of his cooking abilities, Ken is soon recruited as personal chef of Oda Nobunaga.

== Characters ==
=== The present day (Heisei era) ===
Ken
The main character. When transported into the Sengoku period, Ken lost all memories pertaining to his time period. He only remembers how to cook and the history of ingredients and persons. He falls in love with Natsu as the story progresses. He is one of the three people from the Heisei Era to come to Sengoku period. His family name is "Katsuragi" and he was a sous-chef at a hotel in Kyoto (as we will find out from Volume 11 onward). He is a rather large man compared to the Japanese of the time, and is often depicted banging his head against the Kamogai or beams, and in Chapter 17, Volume 3, when he refuted an order, Nobunaga slashed him, leaving a scar on the bottom of his left eyebrow. He can cook anything from Ming (Chinese) style to Portuguese style. He can cook anything the person asks and create new menus every time. He can make ingredients from scratch. Many ingredients he uses were not known during the time.
Youko
She is the last and only person, other than Ken, to have escaped in Chapter 1. She was once Ken's lover during the Heisei Era. She was a pastry chef at a hotel in Kyoto (as we will find out from Volume 11 onward). Like Ken, she is a large woman compared to women of this era, and according to Kaede, "she is just right alongside Ken. She serves Kennyo. Unlike Ken, she provides Kennyo with historical knowledge that only people from the future know, and is valued as a prophetess.

=== Sengoku period and Azuchi–Momoyama period ===
Oda Nobunaga
A legendary warlord. Once he trusts someone, he never doubts them, but when he learns that he has been betrayed, he becomes furious. His sister Oichi tells Ken that he is a lonely person. He prefers strong flavors in his cooking and has a sweet tooth. He has been enjoying Western food since he took Ken under his wing, and after Ken sealed off Western cuisine, he has been holding out for other dishes, much to his frustration.
Natsu
Heroine. A sword smith. She lost her family in the war and is left all alone. When she was collecting sand to make a sword, she rescued Ken from the river. She is in love with Ken. When she hears that Ken was wounded in the Tennoji Battle, she rushes to visit him and asks him to marry her, but she wants him to wait until she can pass on the blacksmithing skills she has inherited to her apprentice, Kanta. To avoid the jealousy of Kaneyakojin, the goddess of swordsmithing, she usually dresses as a man.
Kaede
A kunoichi in Nobunaga's army, she has appeared since volume 3. When Ken infiltrated Kotani Castle under the orders of Nobunaga as a cook for Asakura's side, she was assigned to watch over and protect the hostile Azai Nagamasa and Oichi. Thereafter, she often works together with Ken. She is absolutely committed to Nobunaga's orders and is willing to sell her body for missions and information gathering, but she actually has secret feelings for Ken. she learns how to make confections from Ken, infiltrates Ishiyama Hongan-ji, meets Yoko, and gains her trust as her assistant cook.

== Reception ==
- Volume 6: Oricon weekly chart 25th
- Volume 8: Oricon weekly chart 23th
- Volume 9: Oricon weekly chart 28th
- Volume 10: Oricon weekly chart 15th
- Volume 12: Oricon weekly chart 22nd
- Angoulême International Comics Festival - Best Comic (Nominated)

== Book release information ==
1. August 9, 2011, ISBN 978-4-8322-3261-7
2. October 14, 2011, ISBN 978-4-8322-3269-3
3. February 16, 2012, ISBN 978-4-8322-3283-9
4. June 16, 2012, ISBN 978-4-8322-3301-0
5. October 16, 2012, ISBN 978-4-8322-3325-6
6. January 16, 2013, ISBN 978-4-8322-3338-6
7. June 15, 2013, ISBN 978-4-8322-3358-4
8. October 16, 2013, ISBN 978-4-8322-3376-8
9. February 15, 2014, ISBN 978-4-8322-3392-8
10. July 8, 2014, ISBN 978-4-8322-3408-6
11. October 16, 2014, ISBN 978-4-8322-3421-5
12. February 16, 2015, ISBN 978-4-8322-3439-0
13. July 16, 2015, ISBN 978-4-8322-3458-1
14. November 16, 2015, ISBN 978-4-8322-3476-5
15. April 16, 2016, ISBN 978-4-8322-3494-9
16. August 16, 2016, ISBN 978-4-8322-3512-0
17. December 16, 2016, ISBN 978-4-8322-3527-4
18. April 14, 2017, ISBN 978-4-8322-3542-7
19. August 16, 2017, ISBN 978-4-8322-3559-5
20. December 15, 2017, ISBN 978-4-8322-3584-7
21. May 16, 2018, ISBN 978-4-8322-3609-7
22. September 14, 2018, ISBN 978-4-8322-3629-5
23. January 16, 2019, ISBN 978-4-8322-3653-0
24. June 13, 2019, ISBN 978-4-8322-3677-6
25. October 16, 2019, ISBN 978-4-8322-3696-7
26. March 16, 2020, ISBN 978-4-8322-3723-0
27. July 16, 2020, ISBN 978-4-8322-3754-4
28. November 16, 2020, ISBN 978-4-8322-3779-7
29. April 15, 2021, ISBN 978-4-8322-3817-6
30. September 16, 2021, ISBN 978-4-8322-3855-8
31. February 16, 2022, ISBN 978-4-8322-3892-3
32. July 14, 2022, ISBN 978-4-8322-3928-9
33. November 16, 2022, ISBN 978-4-8322-3952-4
34. March 16, 2023, ISBN 978-4-8322-3975-3
35. July 13, 2023, ISBN 978-4-8322-0309-9
36. December 14, 2023, ISBN 978-4-8322-0349-5
37. May 16, 2024, ISBN 978-4-8322-0401-0

== Television drama ==
A Chef of Nobunaga
- Also known as: The Knife and the Sword
- Japanese: 信長のシェフ
- Genre: Jidaigeki; Historical drama
- Written by: Masaki Fukasawa
- Directed by: Ryōsuke Kanesaki
- Starring: Yuta Tamamori; Mirai Shida; Mitsuhiro Oikawa
- Narrated by: Ryoko Kinomiya (season 1); Rumi Sugimoto (season 2)
- Music by: Yoshihiro Ike
- Ending theme: My Resistance (Something that can't be helped) by Kis-My-Ft2 (season 1); Another Future by Kis-My-Ft2 (season 2)
- Country of origin: Japan
- Original language: Japanese
- No. of seasons: 2
- No. of episodes: 17

Production
- Executive producer: Ikuei Yokochi
- Producers: Tatsuki Ooe (TV Asahi); Kaoru Shimada (Toei Company)
- Production companies: TV Asahi; Toei Company

Original release
- Network: TV Asahi
- Release: January 11, 2013 – September 4, 2014

The series was adapted into a television drama, sometimes referred to in English as The Knife and the Sword, although the title A Chef of Nobunaga is used as well. The nine-episode first season of the drama was broadcast on TV Asahi between January 11, to March 15, 2013. A second season, consisting of eight episodes, aired also on the same network from July 10, to September 4, 2014. This is Tamamori's first starring role in a drama series and his first period drama in the "Friday Night Drama" slot.

The average viewer rating for season one exceeded 10%. This was rare for a late-night broadcast slot. This led to the decision to air Season 2 and its broadcast in prime time.

In the second season, which was broadcast in primetime due to the popularity of the first season, TV Asahi put a lot of effort into it by airing the first episode as a two-hour special, but the drama struggled, partly due to the presence of a popular variety show in the background, and the average viewer ratings remained in the single digits.

=== Development ===
The drama was filmed at Toei studios Kyoto in Kyoto, which is famous for its jidaigeki studios. Despite the cold weather, Tamamori was barefoot and dressed only in a kimono. There were scenes where he had to walk around the mountains carrying a large pot on his back to serve food on the battlefield, and at one point had to jump in a cold river. Through these physically demanding shoots, he said, "I think I got used to the cold a little through the filming of this drama.

In the scene where he cooks French cuisine, Tamamori himself cooked the food. Tsuji Culinary Institute supervised the actual cooking for the dramatization. The lead actor, Yuta Tamamori, had little cooking experience before, but this drama inspired him to start cooking.

=== Synopsis ===
Ken, who was working as a French chef in the present (Heisei era in Japan at the time), suddenly slipped back in time to the Sengoku period one day. Moreover, he had lost most of his memory. All that remained was his knowledge of cooking and a little bit of Japanese history. While wandering around, he wanders into a battlefield where soldiers are fighting. While on the run, he meets Natsu, a woman dressed as a man who works alone as a sword smith. Ken cooks with ingredients from the Sengoku period, relying only on his culinary memory. Eventually, Ken meets the legendary warlord Oda Nobunaga and begins serving as his personal chef. Ken survives the difficult situation with his culinary skills. Every time Ken picks up a knife and delivers the signature line, "I'm coming! The cuisine of Sengoku period !"

=== Main characters ===
Ken by Yuta Tamamori (Kis-My-Ft2)
Protagonist of the drama. He was a French chef in modern times (Heisei era at that time). He went back in time to Sengoku period and lost much of his memory. He was assigned to serve Oda Nobunaga as a chef and served French cuisine to Nobunaga.
Oda Nobunaga by Mitsuhiro Oikawa
Another protagonist of the drama. Ruthless and cruel, but at the same time innovative and rational. He likes new things and shows interest in Ken's cuisine.
Natsu by Mirai Shida
Heroine. A bladesmith. She lost her family in the war and is left alone. She wears men's clothes. She has feelings for Ken.
Toyotomi Hideyoshi by Gori
He is in the service of Nobunaga. When he sees Ken's cooking, he suspects him of being a Portuguese spy.
Kaede by Sei Ashina
A kunoichi (female ninja) under Nobunaga.
Kennyo by Ichikawa Ennosuke IV
A priest of Jōdo Shinshū. He is an enemy of Nobunaga and fights with him for a long time.
Yoko by Yuu Kashii
A mysterious woman who serves under Kennyo. She is actually a time-traveling pastry chef from the present day and Ken's former lover.
Mori Ranmaru by Ren Nagase
A boy in service to Nobunaga.

=== Episodes ===
==== Season 1 (2013) ====
#	Title	Original air date
1	Heisei era chefs go back in time to Sengoku Period! (平成のシェフが戦国時代にタイムスリップ!?)	January 11, 2013
2	Heisei era chef on the battlefield! Sneaking into the enemy's kitchen (平成のシェフが戦場に! 敵の台所に潜入)	January 18, 2013
3	Teriyaki Rebellion! Shogun Chef vs. Heisei Chef (テリヤキの乱!! 将軍VS平成のシェフ)	January 25, 2013
4	Ieyasu's betrayal! Save Nobunaga's crisis with tempura! (家康の裏切り!? 信長の危機を天ぷらで救え)	February 1, 2013
5	Heisei era chef becomes a spy! Assassinate Nobunaga's sister! (平成のシェフがスパイに!! 信長の妹を暗殺せよ!?)	February 8, 2013
6	Win the Battle of Anegawa with Yakiniku! The deadliest enemy has appeared! (姉川の戦いを焼肉で勝利せよ! 最凶の敵登場!!)	February 15, 2013
7	Honnō-ji Incident...A conspiracy between Mitsuhide Akechi and his Heisei lover! (本能寺の変...明智光秀と平成の恋人の陰謀!?)	February 22, 2013
8	Final Chapter "Death of the Beloved! Farewell Dinner is Chocolate Cooking" (最終章「最愛の人死す! 別れのディナーはチョコ料理」)	March 1, 2013
9	"Culinary showdown of destiny! Can they return to the Heisei era?" (運命の料理対決! 平成に帰れるのか!?)	March 15, 2013
Average Rating 10.8% (Ratings are for the Kantō region, according to Video Research).

==== Season 2 (2014) ====
#	Title	Original air date
1	"Heisei French Chef Goes to the Warring States! Stop the assassination of Nobunaga Oda!" (平成のフレンチシェフが戦国へ!? 織田信長暗殺を阻止せよ)	July 10, 2014
2	"The truth about the burning of Hieizan...Heisei Gourmet moves history!" (比叡山焼き討ちの真実...平成グルメが歴史を動かす!?)	July 17, 2014
3	"Nobunaga's chef is kidnapped! Shingen Takeda is furious at Heisei Gourmet!" (信長のシェフ誘拐される! 武田信玄が平成グルメに激怒!?)	July 24, 2014
4	The chef of Heisei poisoned Takeda Shingen!" (平成の料理人が武田信玄を毒殺!?)	July 31, 2014
5	Farewell, Takeda Shingen...the last supper! (さらば武田信玄...最後の晩餐!!)	August 7, 2014
6	"Tokugawa Ieyasu: The Greatest Crisis! Heisei Soup to the Rescue!" (家康 最大の危機! 平成のスープで救え)	August 14, 2014
7	Final Chapter! Topple the Muromachi Shogunate with gourmet food! (最終章! 食わず嫌いグルメで室町幕府を倒せ!!)	August 28, 2014
8	Farewell Heisei Chef! Save Oichi with the food of your memories! (さらば平成のシェフ! 思い出の料理でお市を救え!!)	September 4, 2014
Average Rating 7.3% (Ratings are for the Kantō region, according to Video Research).

=== Release ===
Season one aired from January 11 to March 15, 2013. The series aired every Friday from 23:15 to 0:15 on TV Asahi's "Friday Night Drama". Season two aired every Thursday from July 10 to September 4, 2014, from 19:58 to 20:54 on TV Asahi.
