= He is Beautiful =

2011 Japanese drama

- From left to right: Taisuke Fujigaya, Miori Takimoto, Yuta Tamamori and Hikaru Yaotome
- 美男ですね
- Screenplay by: Maki Takahashi
- Directed by: Toshio Tsuboi; Shunichi Hirano; Yuki Osawa
- Starring: Miori Takimoto; Yuta Tamamori; Taisuke Fujigaya; Hikaru Yaotome
- Music by: Jun Ichikawa; michitomo
- Opening theme: "Everybody Go!" by Kis-My-Ft2
- Country of origin: Japan
- Original language: Japanese
- No. of seasons: 1
- No. of episodes: 11

Production
- Executive producer: Masanao Takahashi
- Producer: Shoichi Katō
- Running time: 54 minutes
- Production company: TBS Television (Japan)

Original release
- Network: TBS Television (Japan)
- Release: July 15 – September 23, 2011

Related
- You're Beautiful (Korean drama); Fabulous Boys (Taiwanese drama)

He is Beautiful (美男ですね, Ikemen desu ne) is a Japanese television drama starring Miori Takimoto, Yuta Tamamori, Taisuke Fujigaya, and Hikaru Yaotome that aired on TBS Television (Japan) from July 15 to September 23, 2011. It is a remake of You're Beautiful starring Jang Keun-suk, which was broadcast in South Korea, 2009.

== For dramatization ==
He is Beautiful is a remake of the 2009 hit drama You're Beautiful starring Jang Keun-suk from South Korea, ahead of other countries. All four leading actors are making their first starring appearances in commercial TV dramas.

For her role, Miori Takimoto had to wear chest compression shirt and cut her hair to look like a boy. She stated: "I also want to be good-looking if I am going to play a boy, and I want to be considered cool by girls of the same gender, so I want to play the role with the gap between beautiful men and beautiful girls. I would like to ask Japanese guys to tell me their secret on how to look cool and boyish!" she says.

Yuta Tamamori of Kis-My-Ft2, who was preparing to make his CD debut on August 10, 2011, says: "I heard that this is the No. 1 drama in Korea, so there is a lot of pressure, but I want to do my best as its Japanese version. I thought that Hwang Tae-kyung, the character played by Jang Keun-suk in the original story, was cool and strange. He had a lot of facial expressions, so I want to be able to play that part well."

Taisuke Fujigaya said: "I was drawn into the film anyway. I hope that many people will feel the same way as I did when I was hooked on the original drama. Kang Shin-woo, who plays the same role in the original drama, is a kind and nice person. I hope that I can bring out that kind and sad feeling. I want to add my own personality to Shin-woo's gentle atmosphere by listening to classical music and keeping myself calm at all times. We will all do our best to pursue our dreams so that this will be our masterpiece!"

Hikaru Yaotome said: "The original drama had funny points and touching scenes, and I watched it from beginning to end in one sitting. The character I play, Jelmi, also has a pop flavor, and I felt that he is a very fun character to watch. The drama has a fun atmosphere, so I would like to enjoy filming with the cast and staff so that I don't drag them down as much as possible. I am especially looking forward to filming the scene where all the members of A.N.JELL perform together. In any case, I will do my best to be cheerful, fun, and energetic so that I can lighten the hearts of those who watch the film."

In the eighth episode, Jang Keun-suk made a guest appearance as himself. The tenth episode was filmed in Okinawa Prefecture, and only a small crew went to Okinawa to shoot the episode, which was shot on a tight schedule. The final scene at ANJELL's concert venue was actually filmed at Kis-My-Ft2's concert at Yokohama Arena, where 15,000 fans gathered.

== Plot ==
20-year-old Miko Sakuraba grew up in an orphanage and is training to be a sister in a convent. One day, the manager of the popular boy band A.N.JELL comes to visit her. Miko's twin brother, Mio – who was about to become the newest member of A.N.JELL – has broken his nose. He asks her to sign a contract to replace her brother. Miko is taken to the office, dressed as a man, and signs the contract in front of the president, but the members of A.N.JELL appear and tell leader Ren Katsuragi that they will reject the contract if he sings here. Driven into a corner, Miko sings a hymn. Knowing that her brother wanted to become a singer because if he became famous as a singer, her mother – who had left her alive – might come to see him, she decides to become a member of "A.N.JELL" for a while as a beautiful man. The leader, Ren, has an outstanding sense of music, but his nervousness and perfectionism make him difficult to get along with. Along with the calm Shu and innocent Yuuki, Mio begins to live with the three men together.

== Awards ==
Award	Category	Name	Result
The 15th Nikkan Sports Drama Grand Prix	Best Picture Award	He is beautiful	Nominated
The 15th Nikkan Sports Drama Grand Prix	Best Actor Award	Yuta Tamamori	Nominated
The 15th Nikkan Sports Drama Grand Prix	Best Actress	Miori Takimoto	Nominated
The 15th Nikkan Sports Drama Grand Prix	Supporting Actress Award	Haruna Kojima	Nominated

== Episodes ==
No.	Title	Original release date	Japan viewership rating (Kanto region)
1	"Korea's No. 1 Super Heart-pounding Love Story Arrives in Japan!! The Newest Band Member is a Girl!? The Start of a Love Square"; Transliteration: "Kankoku No. 1 Chō Mune Kyun Rabu Sutōrī ga Nippon Jōriku!! Ikemen Bando Shin Menbā wa Onnanoko!? Koi no Shikaku Kankei Hajimaru" (Japanese: 韓国No.1超胸キュンラブストーリーが日本上陸!! イケメンバンド新メンバーは女の子！？恋の四角関係始まる)	July 15, 2011	10.9%
2	"The First Live Performance of Love!!"; Transliteration: "Koi no Hatsu Raibu!!" (Japanese: 恋の初ライブ！！)	July 22, 2011	11.0%
3	"A Kiss Too Painful..."; Transliteration: "Setsunasugiru Kisu..." (Japanese: 切なすぎるキス。。。)	July 29, 2011	8.3%
4	"A Confession to You... Painful One-sided Feelings"; Transliteration: "Kokuhaku!! Todoke... Setsunai Kataomoi" (Japanese: 告白!! 届け。。。切ない片想い)	August 5, 2011	7.7%
5	"You Kissed For Real!?"; Transliteration: "Maji de Kisu Shita!?" (Japanese: マジでキスした！？)	August 12, 2011	9.9%
6	"She's Mine"; Transliteration: "Kanojo wa Ore no Mono da" (Japanese: 彼女は俺のモノだ)	August 19, 2011	8.9%
7	"The Fateful Kiss and Miraculous Confession!!"; Transliteration: "Unmei no Kisu to Kiseki no Kokuhaku!!" (Japanese: 運命のキスと奇跡の告白！！)	August 26, 2011	9.9%
8	"Jang Geun-seok Finally Appears!!"; Transliteration: "Chan Gunsoku Tsui ni Tōjō!!" (Japanese: チャングンソク遂に登場！！)	September 2, 2011	10.1%
9	"Finale Break-up... A Cruel Fate!!"; Transliteration: "Saishū Shō Wakare... Zankoku na Unmei!!" (Japanese: 最終章別れ。。。残酷な運命！！)	September 9, 2011	10.0%
10	"Finale Part 1: The Shocking Truth!!"; Transliteration: "Saishū Banashi Zenpen: Shōgeki no Shinjitsu!!" (Japanese: 最終話前編－衝撃の真実!!)	September 16, 2011	11.5%
11	"Fateful Reunion... The Final Confession"; Transliteration: "Unmei no Saikai... Saigo no Kokuhaku" (Japanese: 運命の再会。。。最後の告白)	September 23, 2011	11.5%

== Cast ==
=== A.N.Jell ===
- Miori Takimoto as Miko Sakuraba (female) and Mio Sakuraba (for disguised as male and playing as the real one too), A.N.Jell's new vocalist/pianist
- Yura Furutachi as young Miko
- Kuu Furutachi as young Mio
- Yuta Tamamori as Ren Katsuragi A*N*Jell lead vocal & guitarist
- Riu Tanaka as young Ren
- Taisuke Fujigaya as Shu Fujishiro, A*N*Jell bassist
- Hikaru Yaotome as Yuuki Hongo, A*N*Jell's rapper and drummer

=== A*J Entertainment ===
- Masanobu Takashima as Ando Hiroshi Andō, president of AJ Entertainment.
- Shingo Yanagisawa as Mabuchi Hajime, Mio's manager.
- Nana Katase as Rina
- Anna Nose as Yumiko Sawagi

=== Others ===
- Haruna Kojima as Nana, an actress and idol
- Tanoshingo as Toru, assistant
- Miyuki Imori as Shigeko Sakuraba, Miko and Mio's aunt
- Hisako Manda as Reiko, Ren's mother who is a soloist

==== Paparazzi reporters ====
- Seiji Rokkaku as Deguchi
- Shigenori Yamazaki as Hashimoto
- Yutaka Shimizu as Baba

==== A*N*Jell's fans ====
- Maiko Takahashi as Misaki
- Aoi as Nanami
- Moeri Aizumi as Ayumi

=== Guests ===
- Koda Kumi as herself (ep. 1)
- Yuko Aoki as one of the guests in Mio's welcome party (ep. 1)
- Sylwia Katō as one of the guests in Mio's welcome party (ep. 1)
- Minami Tanaka as one of the guests in Mio's welcome party (ep. 1)
- Kōji Ishizaka as Harada (ep. 1)
- Kanon Tani as a child from the Aozora Gakuen (ep. 1)
- Miyu Honda as a child from the Aozora Gakuen (ep. 1)
- Terumi Nagashima as a child from the Aozora Gakuen (ep. 1)
- Junki Uchida as a child from the Aozora Gakuen (ep. 1)
- Kanon Kasuga as a child from the Aozora Gakuen (ep. 1)
- Naoki Sasahara as a child from the Aozora Gakuen (ep. 1)
- Kazuya Aoyama as a child from the Aozora Gakuen (ep. 1)
- Akane Yoshida as a child from the Aozora Gakuen (ep. 1)
- Toshihiro Yashiba as an A.J Entertainment security guard (ep. 2)
- Mikako Uchida (内田三香子, Uchida Mikako) as a waitress (ep. 3)
- Yukiko Yabe as a shop assistant (ep. 3)
- Ryō Fujimoto (藤本涼, Fujimoto Ryō) as a street clerk (ep. 3)
- Yuto Tsujimoto (辻本優人, Tsujimoto Yuto) as a photographer (ep. 3)
- Kazuyo Aoki
- Naohiro Masuda (升田尚宏, Masuda Naohiro) as a newscaster (ep. 4)
- Shingo Katori as himself
- Jang Keun-suk as himself (special appearance, ep. 8)
