= Youth Detective Haruya =

- Youth Detective Haruya (Japanese: 青春探偵ハルヤ, Hepburn: Seishun Tantei Haruya)
- Genre: Mystery fiction
- Based on: "Perfect Summer for End Credits" by Ēichi Fukuda
- Screenplay by: Shinichi Tanaka; Yukari Nakamura; Ureha Shimada
- Directed by: Toru Otsuka; Takashi Komatsu; Yoshinori Kuraki
- Starring: Yuta Tamamori
- Music by: Akio Izutsu
- Ending theme: "AAO" by Kis-My-Ft2
- Country of origin: Japan
- Original language: Japanese
- No. of episodes: 8

Production
- Executive producers: Yasunori Nakamura; Toshiki Kitani
- Producers: Masahiro Tanaka; Tatsuya Itoh
- Running time: 60min
- Production companies: Yomiuri Telecasting Corporation; Media Mix Japan Co.Ltd.

Original release
- Release: 15 October – 24 December 2015

Youth Detective Haruya is a Japanese TV series produced by Yomiuri Telecasting Corporation and aired on Nippon TV's "Platinum Night Thursday Drama" from October 15 to December 24, 2015. Yuta Tamamori played the lead role in his first Nippon TV drama series and the first lead role for a member of the Johnny & Associates in the same slot, including in a Thursday night drama.

In the original story, multiple incidents involving Haruya take place in parallel and intertwine with each other, but the TV drama was produced as a good-punishment drama with one complete episode.

== Synopsis ==
Haruya Asaki (Yuta Tamamori) is a poor student who earns his tuition and living expenses by working part-time as a demolition worker. His bad friend, Kazuomi Kubodera (Sho Takada), offers him a part-time job in exchange for a large sum of money. The job is to find out who is stalking Miu Nomi (Yua Shinkawa), a beauty queen of same college. When he meets Miu, she tells him that she wants Haruya to investigate the case because she has talked to the police and they will not take her up on her offer. Haruya is attracted by the reward and begins his investigation with his roommate, Toshiki Shinohara (Ami201).

== Characters ==
- Yuta Tamamori as Haruya Asagi. Protagonist. He is a poor student who works only part-time. One day, he is asked by a friend to investigate a stalker. He accepts the case for a hefty fee and solves the problem, but is then inundated with other investigation requests and begins taking on detective work. He was a bad boy in junior high school, so he is used to getting into fights.
- Yua Arakawa as Miu Nohmi. Heroine. She is the winner of a college beauty pageant.
- Sho Takada as Kazuomi Kubodera. Haruya's friend. He offers Haruya, who is in need of money, a large reward and asks him to work as a detective.
- Ami201 as Toshiki Shinohara. Haruya's part-time job and roommate. He is quite large. He helps Haruki with his detective work. He has a strong arm, and when he fights criminals, he sometimes uses wrestling moves.
- Reiko Takashima as Shizue Ishida. Manager of "Alabama", a small restaurant where Haruya and his friends hang out. She watches over Haruya and his friends like a mother.
- Takashi Ukaji as Katsuo Isobe. He is a senior at Haruya's part-time job. He is in love with Shizue from "Alabama".

== Filming ==
According to screenwriter Shinichi Tanaka, the drama was shot in spring and early summer after meetings were held in February. All filming had been completed when the broadcast began in October. In writing the script, he was careful not to spoil the quality for the original work, and tried to have respect and to please the fans of the original work.

Yuta Tamamori, who plays the lead role of Haruya Asagi, said in an interview about his role, "Haruya is smart and courageous, but the part of him that overlaps with me is...he is rather quiet." In this drama, the action scenes in which they and the bad guys fight are always a highlight. Since he plays a strong fighter, he often had a hard time during the action scenes, but with the guidance of the director and assistant director, he was able to play the role with a lot of liveliness. Until acting in this drama, Tamamori was said to have a problem with running. He himself said, "I am often told by the director, 'Please run more coolly.'" He was also known to run weird in the variety shows in which he regularly appeared. His running style was said to have been improved in the action scenes in this drama.

Yua Niikawa, who plays the heroine, said, "I've often played strong-willed roles in the past, but this time I'm playing a role that is more like a girl of my generation, so I want to be conscious of that, such as the way I speak."

Sho Takada who plays Haruya's friend Kazuomi, said, "I've almost never played such a bright role before, so I had to think a lot about how to play the role"

Ami201 who plays Haruya's partner and roommate Toshiki, said "I am actually 35 years old, but it was a precious time for me to be on set, as if I was 20 years old again. However, the scenes where I had to run as fast as I could or grab and throw my partner were a bit physically demanding".

The four main cast members, Yuta Tamamori, Yua Arakawa, Sho Takada, and Ami201, were all shy and did not speak much at the beginning of filming. They were so quiet that there were days when all they could hear was the sound of ramen noodles being slurped during lunch. but they gradually began to open up to each other. Ami201, in particular, is a unique actor and also a comedian over 2 m (6 ft 6 1/2 in) tall. The conversation centering on him became lively, and the shooting gradually proceeded in a friendly atmosphere.

Although this drama was broadcast in the October season, filming began unusually early, in early spring. The reason for this was that the staff wanted to capture images of cherry blossoms blooming on college campuses during the entrance season. The third episode of this drama features a woman working in a cabaret club, and the store scene was filmed in an actual cabaret club. The final episode of this drama featured a special guest appearance by Kozo Kawato of the former professional baseball team Hanshin Tigers, playing himself. Isobe, a Hanshin Tigers fan, is depressed and crying when Kawato appears and plays a scene in which he leaves with some memorable words.

== Episodes ==
No.	Title	Directed by	Original release date
1	"Stalker targeting Miss Campus" "Misu Kyanpasu o Nerau SutÕkā" (ミスキャンパスを狙うストーカー)	Toru Otsuka	15 October 2015
2	"Illegal drugs, incarceration... the case goes dark." "Ihō Doraggu・Kankin…Jiken wa Yami no Naka e" (違法ドラッグ・監禁…事件は闇の中へ)	Toru Otsuka	22 October 2015
3	"Sudden threats from the cabaret girl with whom he is having an affair..." "Uwaki Aite no Kyaba Jō kara Totsuzen no Kyōhaku…" (浮気相手のキャバ嬢から突然の脅迫…)	Takashi Komatsu	29 October 2015
4	"Women's Dormitory Peeping Tom Riot...The Great Hunt for the Peeping Tom Perpetrator" "Joshi Ryō Nozoki Sōdō…Tōsatsu-han o Dai Tsuiseki" (女子寮のぞき騒動…盗撮犯を大追跡)	Takashi Komatsu	5 November 2015
5	"Investigation of an affair with a university professor's wife" "Daigaku Kyōju Tsuma no Uwaki Chōsa" (大学教授妻の浮気調査)	Shinichi Tanaka	12 November 2015
6	"The employment front is very unusual...?" "Shūsoku Sensen, Chō Ijō Ari…!?" (就職戦線、超異状アリ…!?)	Toru Otsuka	19 November 2015
7	"SOS from the children...find the missing mother!" "Kodomodachi kara SOS…Kieta Hahaoya o Sagase" (子供達からSOS…消えた母親を探せ！)	Takashi Komatsu	26 November 2015
8	"Sudden Suicide Threat to Beautiful Education Critic" "Bijin Kyōku Hyōron-ka e Totsuzen no Jisatsu Yokoku" (美人教育評論家へ突然の自殺予告)	Yoshinori Kuraki	4 December 2015
9	"Protect the elderly from fraud." "Kōrei-sha o Sagi kara Mamore" (高齢者を詐欺から守れ)	Toru Otsuka	11 December 2015
-	"Christmas Eve Special just Before the Final Episode" "12・24 Seiya no Saishū-Banashi Chokuzen Supesharu" (12・24聖夜の最終話直前スペシャル)	Unknown	18 December 2015
10	"No adult evil allowed!" "Otona no Aku o Yurusanai!" (大人の悪を許さない!)	Toru Otsuka	24 December 2015

== Related products ==
- Blu-ray and DVD-Boxes were released by Avex Pictures on March 30, 2016. Original booklet is included. The first edition comes with an original photo set.
  - Blu-ray Box (EYXF-10860/4)
  - DVD-Box (EYBF-10855/9)
- Original sound track music by Akio Izutsu (DQC-1510) released by One music record Co., Ltd.
