= Reverse (novel) =

Japanese mystery novel

- Author: Kanae Minato
- Language: Japanese
- Genre: Mystery fiction
- Published: 2015 (Kodansha) (Japanese)
- Publisher: Kodansha
- Publication date: May 20, 2015
- Publication place: Japan
- Pages: 282
- ISBN: 978-4-06-219486-0
- Website: https://bookclub.kodansha.co.jp/product?item=0000189228

Reverse is a Japanese mystery novel by Kanae Minato, serialized in the magazine, Shosetsu Gendai," from November 2013 to December 2014, and published in book form by Kodansha on May 20, 2015. (Note: To commemorate the publication of the book, a collaboration was planned with Tower Coffee, a coffee shop in Hyogo Prefecture that Minato patronizes.。)。Shortlisted for the 37th Eiji Yoshikawa Prize for New Writers; Kodansha paperback edition published on March 15, 2017.

This is Minato's first full-length novel with a male protagonist, and the first work in which she was given a theme by her editor and wrote the ending.

It was dramatized for television by TBS Television (Japan) in 2017.

In 2020, "Day to Day," a project set in Japan during the COVID-19, was relay-serialized on "tree", operated by Kodansha, and the palm version "April 30" (subtitled "Reverse Then") was published on May 30. On November 15, a reading by Yuki Kaji was distributed on "smash". This story was included in the book Day to Day, which was released on March 25, 2021.

== Synopsis ==
Kazuhisa Fukase, an ordinary office worker, meets Mihoko Ochi at his favorite coffee shop, Clover Coffee. The two eventually start dating, and their peaceful daily life begins to flourish. However, one day, about three months into their relationship, Mihoko receives a letter at her workplace saying that "Kazuhisa Fukase is a murderer". When questioned by Mihoko, Fukase begins to tell her about an incident he experienced in the past.

Three summers ago, Fukase, then a senior in college, decided to go on a trip to the Madarao Highlands, located on the border of Nagano and Niigata prefectures, with his college seminar friends Takaaki Murai, Kosei Tanihara, Kosuke Asami, and Yuki Hirosawa. However, on the day of the trip, one of the members, Murai, was to arrive late. Knowing that Hirozawa had been drinking, Fukase, Tanihara, and Asami sent him alone to pick up Murai by car on a mountain road at night in bad weather. However, Hirozawa had an accident along the way and did not return home. When the police interviewed the four men, including Fukase, they explained the situation at the time, but kept the fact of drunk driving hidden until now.

Mihoko becomes angry upon hearing the story and leaves Fukase, but Fukase goes about his daily life as usual after that. However, it turns out that Asami and his other seminar mates have received similar letters of accusation, "XXX is a murderer," and Tanihara is pushed onto the railroad tracks. In order to find out who sent the letter, Fukase decides to investigate the person who has a grudge against them because of Hirosawa's death, and also the person named Hirosawa.

== Characters ==
Kazuhisa Fukase
The protagonist of this work. He works as a salesman for an office equipment manufacturer, Nishida Office Equipment Co. His hobby is enjoying coffee, and his specialty is brewing delicious coffee. He goes to "Clover Coffee" near his home every day. He drinks coffee with honey. He cannot drink alcohol at all.
Since childhood, he has always had a quiet personality and was not good at sports, so he was always inconspicuous at school and did not have many friends. As a result, he has low self-esteem and still harbors a sense of inferiority about his inability to socialize with others. Due to his family's circumstances in his studies, he was unable to attend a preparatory school, and he was unable to open up to the people around him, which left him with a complex. Hirozawa, whom she met in a seminar in her fourth year at university, is his first best friend.
At the time of the incident, he did not have a driver's license. He was secretly opposed to having Hirozawa, who was in a drunken state, pick him up, but he could not bring himself to say so, so he sent him off with a cup of coffee with honey to sober him up.

Mihoko Ochi
Fukase's girlfriend. She works at a bakery called "Grim Bread". She met Fukase at "Clover Coffee" and they started dating. One day, however, she receives a letter at work stating that "Kazuhisa Fukase is a murderer", and asks Fukase if he has any idea what happened. Fukase confides in her about a past incident, but she is unable to accept the fact and keeps her distance from him.
Yoshiki Hirosawa
Fukase's seminar colleague and best friend. He is physically fit and athletic. He is kind and considerate to everyone. He is allergic to buckwheat. His favorite food is curry. He is not positive about finding a job after graduation and says he wants to travel abroad. On a trip three years ago, he was drunk when he went to pick up Murai by car and fell through a guardrail to the bottom of a valley, where he died. His body was found the next day as a burnt corpse at the bottom of a cliff.
Kosuke Asami
A fellow seminar student of Fukase's. A social studies teacher at Narazaki High School. He is a social studies teacher at Narazaki High School. He often meets Fukase for work-related reasons. At the time of the incident, he had obtained a driver's license but had been drinking, so out of concern for his future, he refused to drive himself and urged Hirozawa to pick him up instead. He has been sober since the incident. He had a letter of accusation taped to his car and beer poured on him, but the school thought it was the work of an athletic student who had been suspended from a tournament for drunkenness. According to Murai, Hirozawa once lost his tutoring job.
Mizuki Kida
Mizuki Kida is Asami's colleague. She is a Japanese teacher.
Takaaki Murai
A seminar colleague of Fukase's. His father is a prefectural assemblyman. His father is a member of the prefectural assembly. He is the one who proposed the trip three years ago and invites the seminar mates to a vacation home owned by his uncle. However, due to a traffic accident the day before the trip, he is unable to accompany the group during the day and arrives late at night. He is angered by this, citing his own travel arrangements, and forcibly demands that they pick him up. He is suspicious of Asami and Tanihara and thinks they may have burned the car to cover up the drunken driving, as they were the first to discover Hirosawa's accident.
Yasuo Tanihara
A seminar colleague of Fukase. He works for a trading company. He was on the same baseball team as Hirosawa when they were in college. He is a cheerful and quick-witted leader of the group. On the other hand, he is also strong-willed and pushy. At the time of the incident, he did not have a driver's license. When Murai calls and asks him to pick him up, he initially refuses and offers to take a cab, but Murai's anger makes him unable to refuse, and he finally asks either Asami or Hirozawa to pick him up. In the middle of the film, he is pushed onto a station platform. Although he survives with only minor injuries, he is mentally damaged and is unable to leave his home.
Father of Hirosawa
A mandarin orange farmer in Ehime. He introduces his son's classmates to Fukase in order to have a memorial book written for his son. He regrets opposing his son's trip abroad.
Hirosawa's mother
Told her son how to drink honey in his coffee and sent him honey from oranges. Gave Furukawa the contact information of a fellow seminarian.
Yoichi Matsunaga
He was on the same youth baseball team as Hirosawa when he was in elementary school. He speaks of Hirozawa's athleticism and questions his driving errors.
Mayu Ueda
She and Hirozawa attended the same elementary, junior high, and high school. She lends Fukase her elementary, junior high and high school graduation albums.
Aoi Yoshiume
A friend of Mayu. She and Hirozawa were high school classmates. She has a strong sense of justice, cannot tolerate wrongdoing, and says what she thinks. She had a crush on Hirozawa, but backed off because she thought he was transparent and would go out with anyone if he confessed, and did not want him to be tainted by the color of a hater like herself.
Shoma Okamoto
A classmate of Hirozawa's in high school. Captain of the volleyball team. He wonders why Hirozawa was friendly with the darker Furukawa instead of the more active group like them in high school.
Taishi Furukawa
Hirozawa's best friend and high school classmate. He and Hirozawa moved to Tokyo when they entered college and lived in the same apartment while attending different universities. He says that he and Fukase are similar.
Hiroyuki Iketani
A member of the same baseball team as Tanihara. He tells Fukase about the situation Tanihara was in before he was pushed off the team.

== Bibliographic Information ==
- Book: May 20, 2015, Kodansha, ISBN 978-4-06-219486-0
- Paperback: March 15, 2017, Kodansha, ISBN 978-4-06-293586-9
- Day to Day (includes "Reverse Then")
  - Book: March 25, 2021, Kodansha, ISBN 978-4-06-521842-6
    - Book: March 25, 2021, Kodansha, ISBN 978-4-06-521842-6
    - Book (Aizoban): March 25, 2021, Kodansha, ISBN 978-4-06-521843-3
