= Video Research =

Japanese market research company

Video Research Ltd.
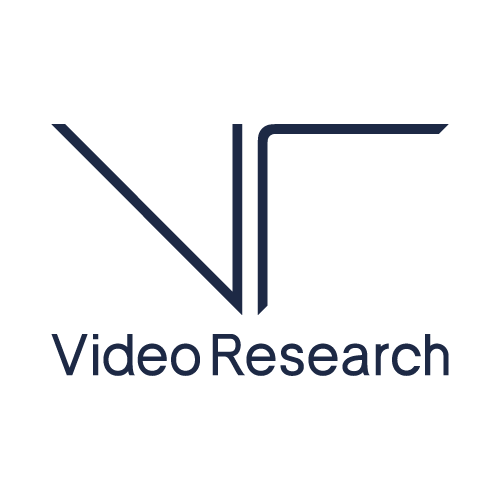
- Native name

Japanese name
- Kanji: 株式会社ビデオリサーチ
- Literal meaning: Video Research
- Industry: Marketing
- Founded: 1962; 64 years ago
- Owner: Dentsu Group (34%)
- Subsidiaries: Video Research USA, Inc.; Video Research International (Thailand) Ltd.

Video Research Ltd. (株式会社ビデオリサーチ) is a Japanese marketing research company conducting audience measurement for television and radio. Since its foundation in 1962, Video Research has created its own nationwide network of branch offices and founded two international subsidiaries. Video Research USA, Inc. was founded in April 1998 and Video Research International (Thailand) Ltd. in January 2002. Dentsu owns 34% of the company.

== Controversies ==
Video Research sued an unnamed former Nippon Television producer in 2005 for damages. It stemmed from an incident of attempted bribery for audience rating manipulation two years ago. The case ended in an amicable, court-recommended settlement.
