= FEMM discography =

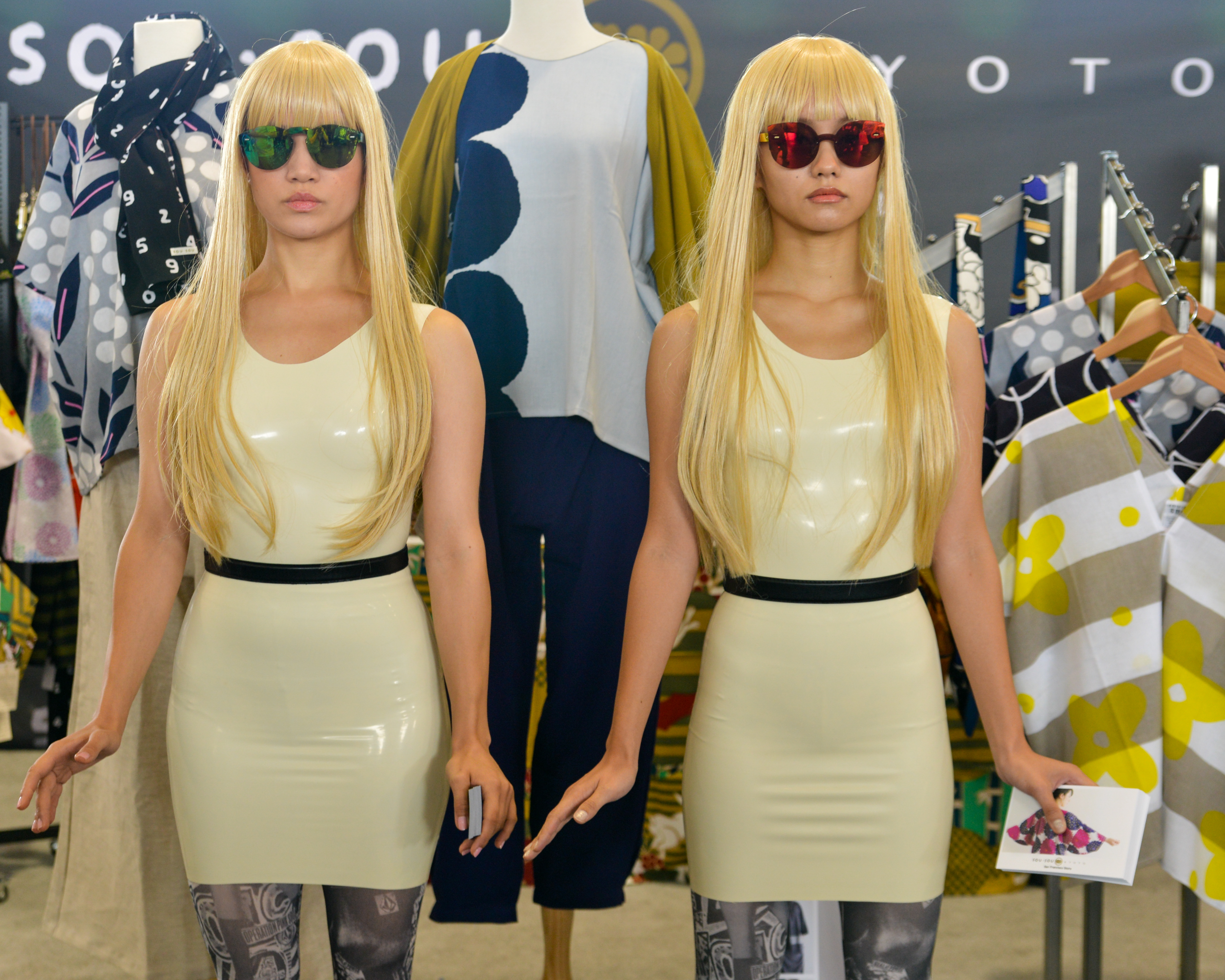
- FEMM at J-Pop Summit 2015 in San Francisco; RiRi (left), LuLa (right)
- Studio albums: 3
- EPs: 6
- Singles: 21
- Remix albums: 2

The discography of Japanese female duo FEMM includes three studio albums, two remix albums, six extended plays, four remix singles, and twenty-one singles. All of their English and Japanese musical releases have been with Maximum10 and Avex Music Creative Inc., two sub-division record labels of Avex Group.

FEMM, who debuted under the abbreviated name Far East Mention Mannequins, originally debuted with several singles and an extended play (EP) Astroboy. Performing in the English language, they released several singles through digital retail stores including iTunes Store and Amazon.com; some of the singles include "Kill the DJ", "Fxxk Boyz Get Money", and "Dead Wrong". FEMM released their debut studio album Femm-Isation (2014) through digital retail stores, and was a collection of songs that FEMM released premiered through their official YouTube channel. After signing an exclusive distribution deal with London-based record label JPU Records, FEMM released their debut physical release Pow!/L.C.S., which also issued a double album with the physical edition of Femm-Isation.

Throughout their career, FEMM have released several music videos to support the release of their singles. FEMM have also promoted their work by releasing remix versions of their previous singles. FEMM released their first remix album in 2014, Femm-Isation Instrumentals, which is an album containing instrumental versions of their debut album.

== Discography ==
=== Albums ===
Year	Album details	Peak chart positions		Certifications
Year	Album details	JPN	US World	Certifications
2014	Femm-Isation: Released: October 1, 2014; Formats: CD, Digital download	—	10	
2021	Tokyo Girls Anthem: Released: December 17, 2021; Formats: CD, Digital download; Track listing: 1. Tokyo Girls Anthem [Prod. by Star Boy]; 2. Mental Health (feat. Yup’in) [Prod. by Radical Hardcore Clique]; 3. Lolly [Prod. by LISACHRIS]; 4. ID:T1G3R [Prod. by Radical Hardcore Clique]; 5. L.C.S. [Prod. by Boys Noixe] (Tokyo Girls Anthem Remastered); 6. Dolls Kill (feat. ELLE TERESA) [Prod. by LAZ¥$TAR] (Tokyo Girls Anthem Remastered); 7. Plastic [Prod. by MYLK] (Tokyo Girls Anthem Remastered); 8. Boss [Prod. by KM] (Tokyo Girls Anthem Remastered); 9. Level Up (feat. Duke of Harajuku) [Prod. by Star Boy, Loesoe, Radical Hardcore Clique] (Tokyo Girls Anthem Remastered); 10. Peach [Prod. by Danny L Harle, Radical Hardcore Clique] (Tokyo Girls Anthem Remastered)	—	—	
2022	Tokyo Ex Machina: Released: January 21, 2022; Formats: CD, Digital download; Track listing: 1. We Got Each Other [Prod. by Kool Kojak]; 2. Outta The Clouds (feat. Yup’in) [Prod. by Woo Min Lee]; 3. Crystal Ball [Prod. by Danny L Harle]; 4. Crawl Away [Prod. by Pat Lukens]; 5. Falling For A Lullaby (Tokyo Ex Machina Remastered); 6. Do It Again (feat. LIZ) (Tokyo Ex Machina Remastered); 7. Sugar Rush (Tokyo Ex Machina Remastered); 8. Dead Of Night (Tokyo Ex Machina Remastered); 9. Keep It Cool (Tokyo Ex Machina Remastered); 10. Tic Toc (Tokyo Ex Machina Remastered)	—	—	
"—" denotes releases that did not chart or was not released.

=== EPs ===
Year	Album details	Peak chart positions		Certifications
Year	Album details	JPN	US World	Certifications
2014	Astroboy: Released: April 24, 2014; Formats: digital download; Track listing: 1. Astroboy feat. Honey-B & W-Trouble; 2. Astroboy (Invaderous Remix) feat. Honey-B & W-Trouble; 3. Astroboy (sfpr Remix) feat. Honey-B & W-Trouble; 4. UFO feat. Fz from sfpr vs Invaderous; 5. Kiss The Rain (sfpr Remix); 6. Kiss The Rain (Invaderous remix); 7. Astroboy (Break Down Ver.) feat. Honey-B & W-Trouble	—	—	
2016	Pow!/L.C.S.: Released: February 24, 2016; Formats: CD, double album, digital download	—	—	
2018	dollhouse: Released: August 4, 2018; Formats: digital download; Track listing: 1. untitled 01 (work in progress); 2. Dead Of Night (work in progress); 3. Up Up & Away; 4. Plastic; 5. untitled 02 (work in progress); 6. Shibuya Ex Horologium (Adirector will write); 7. Boss (work in progress)	—	—	
2020	404 Not Found: Released: November 20, 2020; Formats: CD, digital download; Track listing: 1. Sit Down [Prod. HABANERO POSSE]; 2. Bury Me (With All My $$$) [Prod. YUA]; 3. Peach [Prod. Danny L Harle / Radical Hardcore Clique]; 4. Play By The Rules [Prod. Diana Chiaki]; 5. Boss [Prod. KM]; 6. Level Up (Featuring – Duke Of Harajuku) [Prod. Star Boy / Loesoe / Radical Hardcore Clique]	—	—	
2022	THE SIX: Released: August 17, 2022; Formats: digital download; Track listing: 1. THE SIX; 2. Crawl Away; 3. Level Up (Featuring – Duke Of Harajuku); 4. Peach; 5. Crystal Ball; 6. Private Dancer	—	—	
2023	CHERRY: Released: November 15, 2023; Formats: digital download; Track listing: 1. CHERRY on TOP; 2. Living in the Spotlight - (RiRi solo song); 3. Butterfly to the Moon - (LuLa solo song); 4. SUN; 5. We Flood the Night (MYLK Remix)	—	—	
"—" denotes releases that did not chart or was not released.

=== Remixes ===
Year	Album details	Peak chart positions		Certifications
Year	Album details	JPN	US World	Certifications
2014	Femm-Isation Instrumentals: Released: December 24, 2014; Formats: digital download	—	—	
2016	PoW! / L.C.S. (Instrumental): Released: March 16, 2016; Formats: digital download	—	—	
"—" denotes releases that did not chart or was not released.

=== Cover albums ===
Year	Album details	Peak chart positions		Certifications
Year	Album details	JPN	US World	Certifications
2017	80s/90s J-POP REVIVAL: Released: October 25, 2017; Formats: CD, Digital download, cassette; Track listing: 1. My Revolution (featuring – Akina, Anna & Mikako from FAKY; 2. CANDY GIRL; 3. Samishii Nettaigyo (淋しい熱帯魚); 4. Donna Toki mo. (どんなときも。); 5. Sumire September Love (すみれ September Love); 6. There will be love there –Ai no aru basho– (There will be love there -愛のある場所-); 7. Dear Friends; 8. Roman Hikou (浪漫飛行); 9. Sotsugyo (卒業); 10. BELIEVE IN LOVE; 11. SEVEN DAYS WAR; 12. Konya wa Boogie Back (nice vocal) (featuring – Lil' Fang from FAKY & Yup'in) (今夜はブギー・バック (nice vocal))	—	—	
"—" denotes releases that did not chart or was not released.

=== Singles ===
List of singles provided with charts, dates, and year release.
Title	Year	Peak chart positions		Certifications	Album
Title	Year	Japan Oricon Singles Chart	Billboard Japan Hot 100	Certifications	Album
"Wannabe"	2014	—	—		Femm-Isation
"Kiss the Rain"	2014	—	—		Femm-Isation
"White Noise"	2014	—	—		Femm-Isation
"We Flood the Night"	2014	—	—		Femm-Isation
"Kill the DJ"	2014	—	—		Femm-Isation
"Fxxk Boyz Get Money"	2014	—	—		Femm-Isation
"Dead Wrong"	2014	—	—		Femm-Isation
"Unbreakable"	2014	—	—		Femm-Isation
"Neon Twilight / Countdown"	2016	—	—		FAMM'IN - EP
"Do It Again feat. LIZ"	2017	—	—		Tokyo Ex Machina
"My Revolution / 今夜はブギー・バック (nice vocal)"	2017	—	—		80s/90s J-POP REVIVAL
"卒業 / 浪漫飛行"	2017	—	—		80s/90s J-POP REVIVAL
"Dolls Kill feat. ELLE TERESA"	2018	—	—		Tokyo Girls Anthem
"Shibuya Ex Horologium"	2019	—	—		Non-album singles
"Chewing Gum Cleaner"	2020	—	—		Non-album singles
"Level Up feat. Duke of Harajuku / Summer Dream feat. FEMM (S+ Ver.)"	2020	—	—		404 Not Found - EP
"Tic Toc"	2020	—	—		Tokyo Ex Machina
"Come & Go"	2021	—	—		Non-album single
"Sugar Rush"	2021	—	—		Tokyo Ex Machina
"Keep It Cool"	2021	—	—		Tokyo Ex Machina
"Private Dancer"	2021	—	—		THE SIX - EP
"THE SIX (梨々れんれん神雫平坂ビーストVer.)"	2022	—	—		Non-album single
"CHERRY on TOP"	2023	—	—		CHERRY - EP

=== Remix singles ===
List of remix singles provided with charts, dates, and year release.
Title	Year	Peak chart positions		Certifications	Album
Title	Year	Japan Oricon Singles Chart	Billboard Japan Hot 100	Certifications	Album
"Party All Night" (Sfpr Remix)	2014	—	—		Pow!/L.C.S.
"Kill the DJ" (Invaderous Remix)	2014	—	—		Pow!/L.C.S.
"Whiplash" (Sfpr Remix)	2014	—	—		Pow!/L.C.S.
"Whiplash" (Invaderous Remix)	2014	—	—		Pow!/L.C.S.

=== Featuring singles ===
List of featuring singles provided with charts, dates, and year release.
Title	Year	Peak chart positions		Certifications	Album
Title	Year	Japan Oricon Singles Chart	Billboard Japan Hot 100	Certifications	Album
"No Boyfriend No Problem" (featuring Sak Noel, Kuba & Neitan, Mayra Veronica, and Faky)	2016	—	—		Non-album single

=== As part of FAMM'IN ===
No.	Title	Other(s) Artist(s)	Album	Release date
1	circle	Yup'in, FEMM & Faky	FAMM'IN - EP	April 27, 2016
2	Countdown	FEMM	FAMM'IN - EP	April 27, 2016
3	animus	Yup'in, FEMM & Faky	—N/a	March 15, 2017

=== Other songs ===
Title	Year	Peak chart positions		Other(s) Artist(s)	Album
Title	Year	Japan Oricon Singles Chart	Billboard Japan Hot 100	Other(s) Artist(s)	Album
"CANDY GIRL"	2018	—	—	Hitomi Kaji feat.FEMM	90S & NEW REVIVAL
"CAN'T STOP THIS!"	2020	—	—	Beverly, FAKY, FEMM, lol, Yup'in and Anzai Karen	avex revival trax
"SUMMER DREAM"	2020	—	—	Duke of Harajuku feat. FEMM	RAZZLE DAZZLE

== Music videos ==
FEMM have released a total of 17 music videos from their own discography, alongside one live concert video, three miscellaneous promotional videos, one remix video, and two featuring artist music videos. A total of 13 music videos from their debut album Femm-Isation were directed by creative unit IKIOI. Each music video from FEMM's discography has been choreographed by Japanese production and choreographing team Hidali. The group's fashion directors and designs are by Shoichiro Matsuoka of GM Atelier, a Japanese fashion company that specialize in latex fabrics. Several music videos by FEMM, particularly "Kill the DJ", "Fxxk Boyz Get Money", and "Party All Night", received a large amount of favorable feedback, praising the concept, its convenient use of cosplay and otaku culture, and choreography. "Fxxk Boyz Get Money" received media attention for its imagery and choreography, with several online figures including American blogger and journalist Perez Hilton, American YouTube star Miles Jai, among others publicly commended the video and FEMM themselves.

Title	Year	Director(s)	Description	Ref.
FEMM Agency Syndicate (Teaser)	2013	IKIOI	A "teaser" video that features FEMM walking around the streets of Tokyo and Shibuya, Japan.	
"UFO" (featuring Invaderous vs. FZ from Sfpr)	2014	IKIOI	The video portrays FEMM in a pink room, featuring lights and other club members.	
"Astroboy" (feat. Honey-B and W-Trouble)	2014	IKIOI	The video portrays FEMM with other male background dancers. The video introduces FEMM's managers, Honey-B (portrayed by RiRi; Emily Kaiho) and W-Trouble (portrayed by LuLa; Hiro Todo). The music video has the girls dancing to the song, duplicated several times in front of a white backdrop.	
"Kiss the Rain"	2014	IKIOI	The video portrays FEMM in front of a dark backdrop with a latex school-girl uniform on. Several computer generated imagery surrounds or interferes through the video, with them dancing to several steampunk-influenced imagery.	
"White Noise"	2014	IKIOI	The video portrays FEMM in a dark room, surround by several digitalized imagery and provided with lyrics.	
"We Flood the Night"	2014	IKIOI	The video portrays FEMM as mannequins in still motion. CGI is aimed towards the backdrop of the video, with the girls standing underwater and moving motionless through a city.	
"Kill the DJ"	2014	IKIOI	The video portrays FEMM in front of a white backdrop, wearing latex cadet uniforms; the video is superimposed with several lyrics from the song.	
"Wannabe" (Live Video)	2014	IKIOI	The video features Japanese artists tagging a wall in the middle of a street. FEMM appear near the middle of the song and wear a large zip-shirt that gets spray painted over, camouflaging into the tagging on the wall.	
"Wannabe" (Music Video)	2014	IKIOI	The video portrays FEMM dancing in front of a white and black backdrop, wearing latex school girl uniforms.	
"Fxxk Boyz Get Money"	2014	IKIOI	The video portrays FEMM in latex Lolita outfits, dancing and twerking to the song. Several lyrics from the song is superimposed throughout the video, and features minor GCI.	
"Party All Night"	2014	IKIOI	The video portrays FEMM in front of a greyish-blue backdrop wearing latex nurse/combat uniforms. FEMM walk through a space-like club, with several clones dancing to the song. They walking around several sections of the club, and perform several dance moves.	
"Girls Night Out (Music Video Prototype)"	2014	IKIOI	The video without finished effects.	
"Girls Night Out"	2014	IKIOI	The video portrays FEMM in hipster clothing, dancing and performing the track; several GCI imagery is superimposed on them and behind them.	
"Dead Wrong"	2014	IKIOI	The video portrays FEMM as Japanese geishas, wearing latex kimono's whilst performing in front of CGI imagery of cherry blossoms (Japanese wording "Sakura") and other natural imagery.	
"The Real Thing"	2014	IKIOI	The video portrays FEMM in front of a brown backdrop, performing the song in purple wigs and a latex catsuit. Intercut scenes features a man hacking through a computer system, whilst FEMM (as robotic mannequins) gradually shut down after the man completes his process on the computer.	
"Whiplash"	2014	IKIOI	The video features FEMM on a stage with several background dancers, all in latex catsuits. The dancers and FEMM perform the song with several camera directions changing throughout the process.	
"Unbreakable"	2014	IKIOI	The video portrays FEMM singing the song in front of a grand piano, wearing combat/nurse latex uniforms.	
"Whiplash (Behind The Scenes / Take 0)"	2014	IKIOI	Alternative take from the music video.	
Dance is not a Crime	2015	IKIOI	The video contains the audio track "Anaconda" by Trinidian-American rapper and songwriter Nicki Minaj; the video features FEMM twerking with background dancers, protesting against the 2015 law changes in Japan that state that no one can dancer after a certain time. Failing to do so may lead to possible arrest and charges.	
FEMM Voguing	2015	IKIOI	The video contains the audio track "P.I.M.P" by Japanese producer and composer Invaderous; the video features FEMM dancing to the song in a high skyscraper, wearing white latex mini-dresses and have strapped balloons on their hair.	
"Karma"	2015	IKIOI	The video contains the audio track "Deja Vu" by Karma; the video features FEMM as cameo appearances.	
"No Boyfriend No Problem" (Sak Noel, Kuba & Neitan, Mayra Veronica, & Faky)	2015	IKIOI	The video portrays Japanese girl band Faky dancing in a small club, with FEMM dancing to parts of the song.	
#FEMMIsBackBitches	2016	IKIOI	The video portrays a selection of several songs from FEMM's back catalogue; the video emphasizes FEMM's future material, the promotion of their EP Pow!/L.C.S., and further information of the FEMM Agency Syndicate background and history.	
"Pow!"	2016	IKIOI	The video portrays FEMM walking around Japan in the same costumes from "Fxxk Boyz Get Money"; FEMM dance with background dancers, and also have scenes where they sing in front of shiny foil. The video was inspired by comic book and pop art styles.	
"Remixes"	2016	IKIOI	The video portrays a selection of remix songs from FEMM's back catalogue; the video emphasizes the promotion of their EP Pow!/L.C.S..	
Live at BRDG	2016	—N/a	The video features cameo appearances of Japanese producers and composers Invaderous and Fz from Sfpr; the video features FEMM performing songs at BRDG to promote their remix material from their EP Pow!/L.C.S.	
"L.C.S."	2016	Taihei Shibata	The video portrays FEMM in a digital realm; they are computer generated to show both 3D and 2D qualities.	
"CIRCLE (FEMM, Faky & Yupin)"	2016	maximum10	First video of experimental unit FAMM'IN, formed by FEMM, Faky & Yupin	
"FAMM'IN / circle (Radical Hardcore Remix) (FEMM, Faky & Yupin)"	2016	maximum10	FAMM'IN video to remix song.	
"Neon Twilight"	2016	maximum10	FEMM walk wearing inflatable coats.	
"Countdown"	2016	Yuta Saito	FEMM dance among palm trees and potted plants under colorful lights	
ISETAN ART & CREATION 2016	2016	Takashi Okada	FEMM × Takashi Okada × Radical Hardcore Clique collaboration movie for Isetan fashion exhibition "ISETAN ART & CREATION 2016".	
Live at VRDG+H	2016	—N/a	The video features cameo appearances of Japanese singers Lil’ Fang from FAKY & Yup’in × VJ Daihei Shibata; the video features FEMM performing songs at VRDG+H to promote and their "FAMM'IN" avex supergroup project and "BRDG" and "HIP LAND MUSIC" 3D hologram live show Technology.	
District81 Meets FEMM | Shibuya	2016	—N/a	District81 × FEMM collaboration, vertical video showns the duo dancing on the backseat of a car driving through Shibuya sights, and features a preview of FEMM's 2021 song "Keep it Cool".	
#MannequinChallenge with LIZ	2016	—N/a	Collaboration with singer LIZ. The video from viral YouTube challenge MannequinChallenge with LIZ.	
"Do It Again feat. LIZ"	2017	—N/a	Collaboration with singer LIZ. The video uses Fake 3D technology, using the technique called "SPLIT DEPTH", it is innovative to use the optical illusion that the depth and the stereoscopic feeling are felt without using 3D graphic processing by delimiting the screen on the screen with a line.	
"animus (FEMM, Faky & Yupin)"	2017	Maximum10 & BRDG	Video of experimental unit FAMM'IN	
"Samishii Nettaigyo" (淋しい熱帯魚)	2017	Sho Hatano (OKNACK)	Remake of 1989's Wink music video to the Samishii Nettaigyo song.	
"80s/90s J-POP REVIVAL (Teaser Video) Prod. MYLK"	2017	—N/a	Teaser from "80s/90s J-POP REVIVAL" Cover Album by FEMM	
"Up Up & Away"	2018	—N/a	Video recorded at "AR LIve at Panasonic Immersive Entertainment Booth in CES 2018"	
"Plastic"	2018	—N/a	Made in cooperation with Panasonic	
"『90S & NEW REVIVAL』 / NEW REVIVAL SPOT"	2018	—N/a	The video features previews of avex today singers remake music videos of older avex singers. It include FEMM feat. Hitomi Kaji performing hitomi's song "Candy Girl".	
"Dolls Kill feat. ELLE TERESA"	2018	Yuki Tsujimoto	The video uses part of their live performance from their first one-man ADIRECTOR Vol.1 "DOLLHOUSE".	
"CAN'T STOP THIS! (REVIVE 'EM ALL 2020)"	2020	Sho Hatano (OKNACK)	Beverly, FAKY, FEMM, lol, Yup'in and Kalen Anzai reunite in the special unit "REVIVE 'EM ALL 2020" to make a remake of MAXIMIZOR「CAN'T UNDO THIS!!」, it is an insert song on "M Aisubeki Hito ga Ite" drama. RiRi (FEMM) and Yup'in were the songwriters.	
"Chewing Gum Cleaner"	2020	Midori Kawano	The music video uses previous footage from FEMM's 2018 live performance event ‘DOLLHOUSE’	
"Goodbye to FEMM1.0"	2020	—N/a	Preview of the finalized version of their Dollhouse EP song "untitled 01 work in progress" (now named "Tic Toc"), to signal the duo's musical change.	
"FEMM 2.0 Teaser Movie"	2020	—N/a	Preview of song "Level Up", the first after the duo's musical change.	
"Level Up feat. Duke of Harajuku Prod. Star Boy / Loesoe / R.H.C."	2020	Yuki Tsujimoto	Collaboration with Duke of Harajuku, the video is complemented with "Summer Dream"	
"Duke of Harajuku / Summer Dream feat. FEMM (S+ Ver.)"	2020	Yuki Tsujimoto	Extended and clean version of the song from Duke of Harajuku's Razzle Dazzle album	
"We Flood The Night (Dance Ver.)"	2020	IKIOI	The video features an unreleased alternative version of the song and portrays FEMM dancing another choreography	
"Peach"	2020	Weirdcore	The futuristic MV for "PEACH" has FEMM mannequins RiRi and LuLa dressed as waitresses as they dance and hold a variety of food.	
"Sit Down (Extended Ver.)"	2020	2nd Function / Sho Hatano (OKNACK)	The video, taken in a shot with a fixed angle from a single camera, shows a live performance in which members of the FEMM interact in real time with giant screens and other objects. On a stage 25 meters wide by 15 meters high, huge 3D objects equipped with LED screens move and disappear or reappear, controlled by a technical production system called KINESYS.	
"Tic Toc Prod. Radical Hardcore Clique"	2020	Liam Wong	FEMM sings at streets of city at night after the rain.	
"Come & Go (Vertical Music Video)"	2021	—N/a	Riri and Lula are holograms with hip hop clothes walking through an intersection, in an abandoned New Tokyo.	
"Peach (Vertical Dance Video)"	2021	Sho Hatano (OKNACK)	FEMM dances at the same scenario of "Come & Go" video.	
"Dead Of Night (Vertical Dance Video)"	2021	—N/a	FEMM dances at the same scenario of "Come & Go" video, with the same clothes.	
"Sugar Rush"	2021	Shuhei Yamada / Ryo Noguchi	Black and white video, FEMM dances with dancers in unicycles.	
"Keep It Cool (Vertical Music Video)"	2021	Sho Hatano (OKNACK)	FEMM dances at the same scenario of "Come & Go" video.	
"Private Dancer"	2021	2ndFunction	FEMM dances with tied hands.	
"Tokyo Girls Anthem"	2021	BABYMARY	FEMM dances in an empty nightclub.	
"Mental Health feat. Yup'in"	2022	2nd Function	FEMM and Yup'in perform between LED panels with a chaotic use of laser grid.	
"Lolly (Vertical Music Video)"	2022	Sho Hatano (OKNACK)	FEMM perform at the same scenario of "Come & Go" video.	
"Falling For A Lullaby (Vertical Music Video)"	2022	Sho Hatano (OKNACK)	FEMM perform at the same scenario of "Come & Go" video.	
"We Got Each Other"	2022	Julie Giesen	FEMM walk at city streets until a magic cellphone transform them into humans, who play games at the mall.	
"Outta the Clouds"	2022	Masashi Muto	FEMM are trapped between invisible walls until the sun rises.	
"Falling For A Lullaby"	2022	—N/a	FEEM dances on a stage full of lights.	
"Crawl Away"	2022	—N/a	FEEM explore neo tokyo until they break.	
"THE SIX"	2022	2nd Function	FEEM imagine themselves as zombies in an abandoned factory.	
"Crystal Ball"	2022	—N/a	FEEM perform blindfolded.	
"CHERRY on TOP"	2023	Sho Hatano	FEEM perform in outfits from their various musical eras.	
"FINAL SHOW【Last FEMM-Isation】in LONDON 2023/12/16"	2023	—N/a	Teaser from the Final International Show from FEMM	
"We Flood The Night (MYLK Remix)"	2023	RiRi from FEMM	Video with behind-the-scenes from all music videos and various performances over the past 10 years. Edited by RiRi.	
"RiRi from FEMM - Living in the Spotlight"	2023	RiRi from FEMM	Solo song from RiRi from FEMM	
"LuLa from FEMM - Butterfly to the Moon"	2023	LuLa from FEMM	Solo song from LuLa from FEMM	
