= Kiss the Rain (disambiguation) =

Kiss the Rain could refer to:

- Kiss the Rain, a song by British singer Billie Myers
- Kiss the Rain (FEMM song), a song by Japanese duo FEMM
- "Kiss the Rain", a piano piece from the album From the Yellow Room by composer and pianist Yiruma
