= FEMM =

FEMM may refer to:

- FEMM (duo), a Japanese musical group
- Forum Economic Ministers Meeting (FEMM) of the Pacific Islands Forum, initiated 1995
- FEMM, European Parliament Committee on Women's Rights and Gender Equality
