= Faky =

Japanese girl group

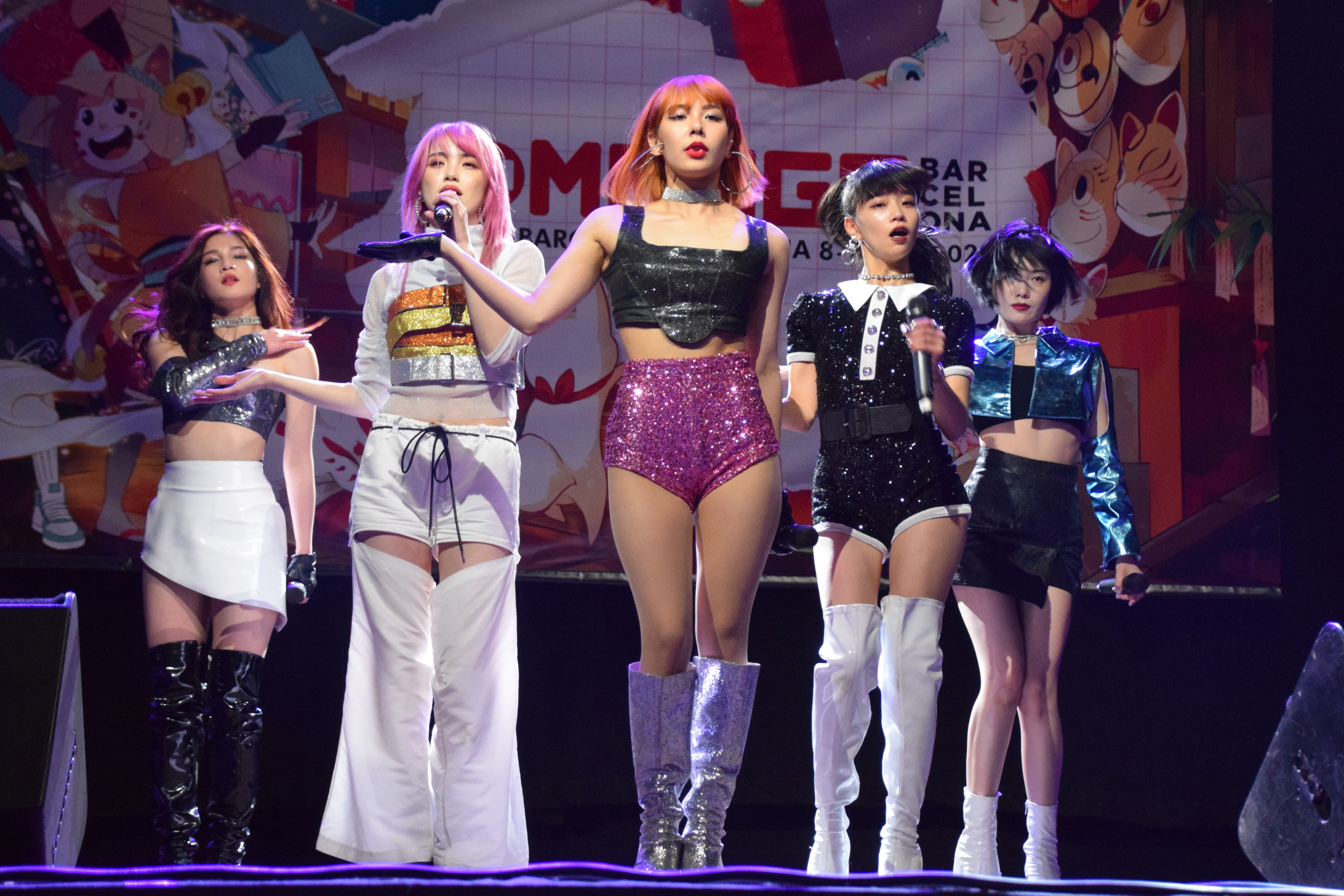

Background information
- Origin: Tokyo, Japan
- Genres: J-pop; R&B
- Years active: 2013–2024
- Labels: Avex Management; Rhythm Zone
- Past members: Anna Sawai; Lil' Fang; Mikako; Diane; Tina; Hina; Akina; Taki
- Website: faky.jp

Faky (stylized as FAKY) was a five-person Japanese girl group that debuted in 2013 under Avex's Rhythm Zone record label. The group has gone through two reformations and disbanded in 2024. It consisted of Lil' Fang, Mikako, Hina, Akina, and Taki at the end.

The group name was derived from the word "fake" to challenge themselves to bring something "real" to the Japanese music scene. Their name also stands for "Five Ass Kicking Youngsters" and "FAntastic toKYo". The group defines themselves as a "Next Generation Girls Union" and tends to take musical inspiration from outside of Japan while incorporating Japanese culture and fashion.

== History ==
The group's name and concept was first revealed on a teaser site on July 19, 2013, before the original lineup of members, Anna (Sawai), Diane, Tina, Mikako, and Lil'Fang, was officially revealed on July 22. Their first music video "Better Without You" was released on July 29, 2013.

In June 2014, the group announced that they would be on hiatus. Their first album The One was released through iTunes on July 2, 2014.

In October 2015, the group returned from being on hiatus for more than a year. During this time, Akina joined the group while Diane and Tina left. On May 11, 2016, the group then released the second EP Candy.

In 2016, Faky, musical duo FEMM, and singer and songwriter Yup'in formed the supergroup Famm'in and released a self-titled EP.

On June 14, 2017, the group made their major label debut with the third EP Unwrapped.

On November 16, 2018, Sawai announced on Instagram that she would be departing from the group to pursue an acting career. She performed as a member for the last time at Faky's headline tour, fo(u)r, on December 20. On the same day, Faky announced that they added two new members, Hina and Taki, and would continue as a five-member group.

On November 27, 2020, member Akina made her solo debut with the single "Touch".

On November 19, 2023, it was announced that the group would be suspending their activities following a last concert on January 13, 2024 at KT Zepp Yokohama. It was also revealed that, after the suspension, members Lil' Fang and Mikako would be departing from the group while the remaining members would focus on individual activities.

On July 30, 2024, members Akina, Taki and Hina posted to their Instagram accounts that the group had disbanded. No reason was given.

The following day, Akina announced on her Instagram that she had left Rhythm Zone.

== Members ==
Name	Date of birth (age)	Place of birth	Nationality	Role	Active Period
Lil' Fang (リル ファング)	November 29, 1993 (age 32)	Tokyo, Japan	Japanese	Leader (2018–2024), Main Vocalist	2013–2024
Mikako (ミカコ)	June 7, 1994 (age 31)	Fukuoka, Japan	Japanese	Captain, Vocalist, Stylist	2013–2024
Anna (Sawai) (アンナ)	June 11, 1992 (age 33)	Wellington, New Zealand	Japanese	Leader (2013–2018), Vocalist, Dancer	2013–2018
Diane (ダイアン)	January 28, 1996 (age 30)	Okinawa, Japan	American	Vocalist	2013–2015
Tina (ティナ)	December 18, 1996 (age 29)	Georgia, United States	American	Vocalist	2013–2015
Akina (アキナ)	November 23, 1999 (age 26)	California, United States	American	Main Dancer, Lead Vocalist	2015–2024
Hina (ヒナ)	February 19, 1997 (age 29)	Tokyo, Japan	Japanese	Vocalist	2018–2024
Taki (タキ)	April 21, 2000 (age 25)	Shizuoka, Japan	Filipino and Brazilian	Lead Dancer, Vocalist	2018–2024

== Discography ==
=== Studio albums ===
Title	Details	Peak chart positions
Title	Details	JPN
F	Released: October 19, 2022; Label: Rhythm Zone; Format: CD, CD+Blu-ray, Digital download; Track listing: 1. Diamond Glitter; 2. Choco Fudge; 3. My Story; 4. GIRLS GOTTA LIVE; 5. ANTIDOTE; 6. NEW AGE; 7. half-moon 8. Darling (ダーリン); 9. little more 10. The Light; 11. 99; 12. HappyEverAfter; 13. Take my hand 14. Sayonara My Ex; 15. It’s a small world 16. Futakoito (ふたこ糸); 17. five+	24

=== Live albums ===
Title	Details
Faky First Live: Unwrapped	Released: December 19, 2018; Label: Rhythm Zone; Format: Digital download; Track listing: 1. Surrender (FAKY FIRST LIVE "Unwrapped" at shibuya duo MUSIC EXCHANGE (2017.10.13) -Live Version-); 2. Bad Things (FAKY FIRST LIVE "Unwrapped" at shibuya duo MUSIC EXCHANGE (2017.10.13) -Live Version-); 3. Chase Me (FAKY FIRST LIVE "Unwrapped" at shibuya duo MUSIC EXCHANGE (2017.10.13) -Live Version-); 4. Someday We'll Know(FAKY FIRST LIVE "Unwrapped" at shibuya duo MUSIC EXCHANGE (2017.10.13) -Live Version-); 5. Are You OK?(FAKY FIRST LIVE "Unwrapped" at shibuya duo MUSIC EXCHANGE (2017.10.13) -Live Version-); 6. Candy (FAKY FIRST LIVE "Unwrapped" at shibuya duo MUSIC EXCHANGE (2017.10.13) -Live Version-); 7. Who We Are (FAKY FIRST LIVE "Unwrapped" at shibuya duo MUSIC EXCHANGE (2017.10.13) -Live Version-); 8. Better Without You (FAKY FIRST LIVE "Unwrapped" at shibuya duo MUSIC EXCHANGE (2017.10.13) -Live Version-); 9. SUGA SWEET (FAKY FIRST LIVE "Unwrapped" at shibuya duo MUSIC EXCHANGE (2017.10.13) -Live Version-); 10. You (FAKY FIRST LIVE "Unwrapped" at shibuya duo MUSIC EXCHANGE (2017.10.13) -Live Version-)

=== EPs ===
Title	Details	Peak chart positions	Sales
Title	Details	JPN	Sales
The One	Released: July 2, 2014; Label: Rhythm Zone; Formats: Digital download; Track listing: 1. P.O.V.; 2. Better Without You; 3. Girl Digger; 4. Get Up; 5. What R You Waiting For; 6. The One; 7. P.O.V. (Fedde Le Grand Remix); 8. Better Without You – English Ver. (iTunes only); 9. Better Without You – English Ver. (Ivan Gomez & Nacho Chapado Remix) (iTunes only)	—	
Candy	Released: May 11, 2016; Label: Rhythm Zone; Formats: CD, digital download; Track listing: 1. Pretty; 2. Afterglow; 3. Are You OK?; 4. You; 5. Candy; 6. Better Without You -Retake Version- (iTunes only)	—	
Unwrapped	Released: June 14, 2017; Label: Rhythm Zone; Formats: CD, CD+DVD, digital download; Track listing: 1. Keep Out; 2. Candy; 3. Are You OK?; 4. Surrender; 5. Bad Things; 6. Someday We'll Know; Bonus Tracks (CD only): 1. Keep Out (Remute Club Mix); 2. Candy (Yamata Remix); Bonus Tracks (Digital only): 1. Keep Out (Remute Club Mix); 2. Candy (Maria Helena Remix); Limited CD: 1. Candy; 2. Bad Things; 3. Surrender; 4. Someday We'll Know; DVD Tracklist: 1. Candy Music Video; 2. Are You OK? Music Video; 3. Surrender Music Video; 4. Someday We'll Know Music Video	75	
RE:wrapped	Released: July 25, 2020; Label: Rhythm Zone; Formats: Digital download; Track listing: 1. Re:Candy; 2. Re:Surrender; 3. Re:LAST PETAL; 4. Re:Chase Me; 5. Re:Bad Things; 6. Re:Someday We'll Know; 7. Re:Who we are	—	
Departure	Released: November 15, 2023; Label: Rhythm Zone; Formats: CD, CD+DVD, CD+Blu-ray, digital download; Track listing: 1. Departure; 2. To The Stars; 3. Daijōbu (大丈夫) [Prod. Taku Takahashi (m-flo)]; 4. Monochrome (モノクロ); 5. Summer Dive [Prod. Taku Takahashi (m-flo)]; 6. Rock, Paper, Scissors; DVD/Blu-ray Tracklist: 1. Monochrome Music Video; 2. Summer Dive [Prod. Taku Takahashi (m-flo) Music Video; 3. Rock, Paper, Scissors Music Video; ・FAKY ONEMANLIVE 2023 FEEL IT ALL @ LIQUIDROOM (2023.03.05): 1. OPENING VCR; 2. GIRLS GOTTA LIVE; 3. NEW AGE; 4. ANTIDOTE; 5. Someday We'll Know; 6. Diamond Glitter; 7. Candy; 8. MC 1; 9. SE 1; 10. 99; 11. Surrender; 12. Last Petal; 13. SE 2; 14. four 15. Take my hand 16. Sayonara My Ex; 17. Ningyō no Ie (人形の家); 18. Black Ghost; 19. Choco Fudge; 20. My Story; 21. MC 2; 22. P.O.V.～P.O.V. (Fedde Le Grand Remix) + Why'd You Make Me Cry + Bad Things + little more + It's a small world + Better Without You; 23. MC 3; 24. Rock, Paper, Scissors; 25. [ENCORE]; 26. VCR; 27. HappyEverAfter; 28. SUGA SWEET; 29. Get Up; 30. MC 4; 31. five+; 32. MC 5	23	2,728

=== Singles ===
Title	Details	Notes
"When You Wish Upon a Star"	December 18, 2013; Format: Digital download	Cover of the song from Disney's Pinocchio
"Better Without You"	January 15, 2014; Format: Digital download; Track listing: 1. Better Without You; 2. Better Without You English Ver. (REMO-CON Remix); 3. Better Without You English Ver. (Dave Aude Remix); 4. Better Without You (REMO-CON Remix); 5. Better Without You (Dj Yummy Remix); 6. Better Without You (ASY Remix)	
"Girl Digger"	January 22, 2014; Format: Digital download	
"The One"	January 29, 2014; Format: Digital download	
"Afterglow"	October 21, 2015; Format: Digital download	
"You"	October 21, 2015; Format: Digital download	
"Candy"	October 21, 2015; Format: Digital download	
"Surrender"	March 1, 2017; Format: Digital download	
"Suga Sweet"	August 30, 2017; Format: Digital download	
"Chase Me"	October 25, 2017; Format: Digital download	Ending theme of anime Gundam Build Fighters Battlogue
"Someday We'll Know" (English Version)	December 15, 2017; Format: Digital download	
"Candy" (English Version)	February 16, 2018; Format: Digital download	
"Who We Are"	April 11, 2018; Format: Digital download	
"four"	July 11, 2018; Format: CD, digital download; Track listing: 1. four 2. four -instrumental-; 3. four covered by KAHONO (CD only)	4th ending theme of anime Black Clover
"Bad Things" (English Version)	August 29, 2018; Format: Digital download	
"Last Petal"	November 11, 2018; Format: Digital download	Opening theme of drama Anata niwa Watasanai
"Girls Gotta Live"	August 23, 2019; Format: Digital download	
"Antidote"	October 18, 2019; Format: Digital download	
"New Age"	November 22, 2019; Format: Digital download	Theme of variety show Girls Meeting-TV
"Half-Moon"	February 26, 2020; Format: Digital download	
"Re:Candy"	May 27, 2020; Format: Digital download	
"Re:Surrender"	June 10, 2020; Format: Digital download	
"Half-Moon" feat. Novel Core	July 7, 2020; Format: Digital download	To show Who is a Wolf? Season 7 Written by Lil' Fang and Novel Core
"Darling (ダーリン)" prod. GeG	August 26, 2020; Format: Digital download	
"Little More"	November 4, 2020; Format: Digital download	
"The Light"	January 27, 2021; Format: Digital download	Campaign song of film Suicide Forest Village
"99"	March 17, 2021; Format: Digital download	Theme of drama Rika: Reverse
"HappyEverAfter"	April 26, 2021; Format: Digital download	To show Who Is a Wolf? Season 9
"Take My Hand"	June 16, 2021; Format: Digital download	Theme of drama A Devil and Her Love Song
"Sayonara My Ex"	August 30, 2021; Format: Digital download	
"It's a Small World"	November 10, 2021; Format: Digital download	Campaign song of road relay 36th East Japan Women's Ekiden
"Futakoito (ふたこ糸)"	February 2, 2022; Format: Digital download	A campaign song for the horror movie "Ushikubi Village" directed by Takashi Shimizu.
"Diamond Glitter"	May 25, 2022; Format: Digital download	
"Choco Fudge"	July 7, 2022; Format: Digital download	
"Rock, Paper, Scissors"	November 16, 2022; Format: Digital download	Opening theme of drama Saisho wa pâ
"Summer Dive" Prod. Taku Takahashi (m-flo)	August 7, 2023; Format: Digital download	
"Monochrome (モノクロ)"	September 12, 2023; Format: Digital download	To show Is She the Wolf? Written by Lil' Fang and UTA (TinyVoice, Production)

=== Remix singles ===
Title	Release
"Better Without You" (Remixes)	December 13, 2013; Format: Digital download; Track listing: 1. Better Without You (English Version) (Dave Aude Remix); 2. Better Without You (English Version) (Remo-Con Remix); 3. Better Without You (Remo-Con Remix); 4. Better Without You (Dj Yummy Remix)
"Candy" (Yamato Remix)	August 10, 2016; Format: Digital download
"Suga Sweet" (Remixes)	May 9, 2018; Format: Digital download; Track listing: 1. Suga Sweet (Gummyb3ars Remix); 2. Suga Sweet (Remo-Con Remix)
"Girls Gotta Live" (Angermans Remix)	September 11, 2019; Format: Digital download
"Antidote" (Disk Nagataki Remix)	November 8, 2019; Format: Digital download
"New Age" (Bunny Remix)	January 1, 2020; Format: Digital download
"It's a Small World" (Boys Get Hurt Remix)	November 17, 2021; Format: Digital download
"It's a Small World" (YOKYO & OMKT Remix)	November 24, 2021; Format: Digital download

=== Solo singles ===
Title	Member	Album	Release date	Notes
"Touch"	Akina	—N/a	November 27, 2020	Cover of the 2014 Shura song
"Gravity"	Akina	—N/a	December 18, 2020	
"Amazing Grace"	Akina	—N/a	February 12, 2021	Cover of hymn Theme of film A Morning of Farewell
"Ningyō no Ie (人形の家)"	Lil' Fang	—N/a	March 24, 2021	Cover of the 1969 Mieko Hirota song Theme of drama Rika: Reverse and film Rika
"Stupid, Careless, Dumb"	Akina	—N/a	October 15, 2021	
"Future"	Akina	—N/a	October 27, 2021	
"Black Ghost"	Hina & Taki	—N/a	August 17, 2022	Theme song for the drama Othello

=== Collaborations ===
Title	Member	Other Artists	Album	Release date
"wimp" feat. Lil' Fang (from Faky)	Lil' Fang	Back-On	Reload	October 1, 2014
"No Boyfriend No Problem"	Anna, Lil' Fang, Mikako, Akina	FEMM, Sak Noel, Kuba & Neitan, Mayra Verónica	—N/a	February 24, 2016
"Play The Game" feat. Lil'Fang (from Faky)	Lil' Fang	Remute	Play The Game	February 29, 2016
"Luxury"	Lil' Fang	Yup'in, Liz	—N/a	December 22, 2016
"Shining" feat. Anna & Akina (from Faky)	Anna, Akina	Yamato	—N/a	April 26, 2017
"Japanicano" (feat. Faky)	Anna, Lil' Fang, Mikako, Akina	CrazyBoy	Neotokyo Forever	July 4, 2018
"Tenkiame (天気雨)" feat. Amaya (from Faky)	Hina	Novel Core	—N/a	December 23, 2020
"Tenkiame (天気雨)" feat. Amaya (from Faky) (Taku's Japaneggae Remix)	Hina	Novel Core, Taku Takahashi	—N/a	February 24, 2021
"Happy Love" feat. Hina (from Faky) & Shun-Box	Hina	Spicy Chocolate, Shun-Box	—N/a	August 21, 2021
"Everlasting Eternity" feat. Akina	Akina as soloist	The Burning Deadwoods	—N/a	October 6, 2021
"Break it down"	Lil'Fang	Sota Hanamura from Da-ice	—N/a	July 11, 2022
"Chitty Chitty Bang Bang (チキチキバンバン)"	Akina, Taki	hibiki & moca from lol, Maria Kaneya from GENIC (all as QUEEDOM unit)	Chitty Chitty Bang Bang (Special Paripi Album)	July 20, 2022
"Antídoto" (feat. FAKY)	Akina, Taki	EVE	—N/a	October 7, 2022

=== Other appearances ===
Title	Member	Album	Release date	Note
"Circle"	Anna, Lil' Fang, Mikako, Akina	Famm'in	April 27, 2016	Song by Famm'in (Faky, FEMM, Yupin)
"Circle" (Radical Hardcore Remix)	Anna, Lil' Fang, Mikako, Akina	Famm'in	April 27, 2016	Song by Famm'in (Faky, FEMM, Yupin)
"Pretty"	Anna, Lil' Fang, Mikako, Akina	Famm'in	April 27, 2016	
"Animus"	Anna, Lil' Fang, Mikako, Akina	—N/a	March 15, 2017	Song by Famm'in (Faky, FEMM, Yupin)
"My Revolution"	Anna, Mikako, Akina	80s / 90s J-pop Revival	October 18, 2017	Cover of the 1986 Misato Watanabe song
"Boogie Back (今夜はブギー・バック)" (Nica Vocal)	Lil' Fang	80s / 90s J-pop Revival	October 18, 2017	Cover of the 1994 Kenji Ozawa and Scha Dara Parr song
"Girls Be Ambitious"	Anna	Girls Mode 4: Star Stylist OST	December 20, 2017	
"Feelin' Good -It's Paradise-"	Anna, Lil' Fang, Mikako, Akina	90s & New Revival	August 15, 2018	Cover of the 1997 Da Pump song
"Feelin' Good -It's Paradise-" (Retake Version)	Lil' Fang, Mikako, Hina, Akina, Taki	avex revival trax	May 13, 2020	Cover of the 1997 Da Pump song
"Can't Stop This!!"	Lil' Fang, Mikako, Hina, Akina, Taki	avex revival trax, M Aisubeki Hito ga Ite OST	May 13, 2020	Song by Revive 'em All 2020 (Beverly, Faky, FEMM, lol, Yup'in, Kalen Anzai); Remake of the 1995 Maximizor song "Can't Undo This!!"
"Deatta Koro no Yō ni (出逢った頃のように)"	Amaya	avex revival trax, M Aisubeki Hito ga Ite OST	May 13, 2020	Cover of the 1997 Every Little Thing song
"Can't Stop This!!" (Steve Aoki Remix)	Lil' Fang, Mikako, Hina, Akina, Taki	—N/a	July 1, 2020	Steve Aoki remix of the 2020 Revive 'em All 2020 song
"Can't Stop This!!" (Steve Aoki Remix) (Club Mix)	Lil' Fang, Mikako, Hina, Akina, Taki	—N/a	July 1, 2020	Steve Aoki remix of the 2020 Revive 'em All 2020 song

== Music videos ==
=== As group ===
Year	Title	Notes
2013	"Better Without You"	
2013	"Girl Digger"	
2015	"Afterglow"	
2016	"You"	
2016	"Candy"	
2017	"Surrender"	
2017	"Someday We'll Know"	
2017	"Suga Sweet"	
2018	"Who We Are"	
2018	"Bad Things" (English Version)	
2019	"Girls Gotta Live"	
2019	"Antidote"	
2019	"New Age"	
2020	"Half-moon"	
2020	"Half-moon" (Spain document ver.)	
2020	"Half-moon" feat. Novel Core	
2020	"Darling (ダーリン)" prod. GeG	
2020	"Little More"	
2021	"The Light"	
2021	"99"	
2021	"99" (dance ver.)	
2021	"Happy Ever After"	
2021	"Take My Hand"	
2021	"Sayonara My Ex"	
2022	"Futakoito (ふたこ糸)"	
2022	"Diamond Glitter"	
2022	"Choco Fudge"	
2022	"My Story"	
2022	"Rock, Paper, Scissors"	
2023	"Summer Dive" Prod. Taku Takahashi (m-flo)	
2023	"Monochrome (モノクロ)"	

=== As soloist ===
Year	Title	Member	Notes
2020	"Gravity"	Akina	
2021	"Amazing Grace"	Akina	
2021	"Ningyō no Ie (人形の家)"	Lil' Fang	
2021	"Future"	Akina	
2022	"Black Ghost"	Hina & Taki	

=== As featured artist ===
Year	Title	Member	Other artists	Notes
2014	"Wimp" feat. Lil' Fang (from Faky)	Lil' Fang	Back-On	
2015	"Katy"	Anna	Elliott Yamin	
2016	"Circle"	Anna, Lil' Fang, Mikako, Akina	Famm'in	
2016	"Circle" (Redical Hardcore Remix)	Anna, Lil' Fang, Mikako, Akina	Famm'in	
2016	"Luxury"	Lil' Fang	Yup'in, Liz	
2017	"Animus"	Anna, Lil' Fang, Mikako, Akina	Famm'in	
2020	"Can't Stop This!!"	Lil' Fang, Mikako, Amaya, Akina, Taki	Revive 'em All 2020	
2020	"Can't Stop This!!" (Steve Aoki Remix)	Lil' Fang, Mikako, Amaya, Akina, Taki	Revive 'em All 2020, Steve Aoki	
2020	"103" feat. motoki ohmori	Amaya	Kerenmi, motoki ohmori	
2020	"Tenkiame (天気雨)" feat. Amaya (from Faky)	Amaya	Novel Core	
2021	"Happy Love" feat. Hina (from Faky) & Shun-Box	Amaya	Spicy Chocolate, Shun-Box	
2022	"Cici Cici Bam Bam"	Akina, Taki	QUEEDOM	

== Filmography ==
=== Films ===
Year	Title	Members / Roles	Notes
2016	L (L -エル-)	Mikako as Mary	Movie based on the 2015 Acid Black Cherry album

=== Television series ===
Year	Title	Members / Roles	Network	Notes
2014	Hakata Stay Hungry Season 1 (博多ステイハングリー)	Mikako as host	TNC	Local variety program
2020	M Aisubeki Hito ga Ite (M 愛すべき人がいて)	Hina as vocalist of OTF	TV Asahi	Non-fiction drama
2021	Girl Gun Lady (ガールガンレディ)	Hina as Mitsue Amemiya	MBS/TBS	Tokusatsu drama

=== Web series ===
Year	Title	Members / Roles	Network	Notes
2016	Are You OK?	Anna, Lil' Fang, Mikako, Akina		Interactive drama
2018	colors	Anna	FOD	Coming-of-age mystery drama
2020	Who is the Wolf? Season 7 (月とオオカミちゃんには騙されない)	Hina	AbemaSPECIAL	Romantic reality show
2020	bpm special Faky "Live In Madrid"	Lil' Fang, Mikako, Hina, Akina, Taki	AbemaSPECIAL	Documentary program
2020–present	FakyWorld	Lil' Fang, Mikako, Hina, Akina, Taki	YouTube	Faky original variety show
2021	Who is the Wolf? Season 9 (恋とオオカミには騙されない)	Taki	AbemaSPECIAL	Romantic reality show
2021	Koisuru Method (恋するメソッド)	Hina	AbemaSPECIAL	Romantic variety show
2021	Who is a Wolf? Season 10 (虹とオオカミには騙されない)	Taki	AbemaSPECIAL	Romantic reality show
2021	Future Century Shibuya (未来世紀SHIBUYA)	Hina as Ako	Hulu	Comedy-mystery darama
2023	Is She the Wolf? (オオカミちゃんには騙されない)	Mikako	Netflix	Romantic reality show

=== Radio series ===
Year	Title	Members / Roles	Network	Notes
2019	Wrep 5 (ゴジレプ)	Lil' Fang, Akina	Wrep	Hip hop music program
2019–present	Wrep 6 (ロクレプ)	Lil' Fang, Akina	Wrep	Hip hop music program
2021–present	Fake or Real	Lil' Fang, Mikako, Hina, Akina, Taki	Audee	Faky original talk show

=== Video games ===
Year	Title	Members / Roles	Notes
2017	Girls Mode 4: Star Stylist	Anna as Black Swan	Nintendo 3DS video game
2017	Style Savvy: Styling Star	Anna as Angélique Noir; Akina as Yolanda Artemisia	Western version of Nintendo 3DS video game

== Live performances ==
=== Concerts ===
Title	Date	City	Venue	Notes
Faky First Live "Unwrapped"	October 13, 2017	Tokyo, Japan	Shibuya Duo Music Exchange	
Faky First Live "Unwrapped" -Encore Edition-	January 26, 2018	Osaka, Japan	Osaka Muse	
Faky Live 2018 "fo(u)r"	December 20, 2018	Tokyo, Japan	Liquidroom Ebisu	
Faky Online Live #WeAreAllHereTogether	January 24, 2021	World	Openrec.tv	Online concert
Faky Online Live 2021 #FakyWorld	November 3, 2021	World	YouTube Live	Free online concert
Faky Live 2022 #nofilter	February 23, 2022	Tokyo, Japan	Kanda Square Hall	

=== Events ===
Title	Date	City	Venue	Notes
Famm'in TYO #0	May 28, 2016	Tokyo, Japan	Circus Tokyo	
Faky Christmas Event 2017	December 26, 2017	Tokyo, Japan	Private	
Faky Premium Christmas Event 2019	December 22, 2019	Tokyo, Japan	Private	
Faky Meet & Greet Special Party	February 23, 2020	Tokyo, Japan	Daikanyama Loop	
Faky HappyEverAfter Release Party	May 5, 2021	World	Nissin Power Station [Reboot]	Online event

=== Joint Events ===
Title	Date	City	Venue	Notes
Anime Friends 2019	July 14, 2019	São Paulo, Brazil	Palácio das Convenções do Anhembi	
Otakuthon 2019	August 16, 2019	Montreal, Canada	Palais des congrès de Montréal	
Japan Weekend Madrid	February 15 – 16, 2020	Madrid, Spain	IFEMA	
Hyper Japan Online 2021	July 10, 2021	World	Zoom	Online event

== Awards and nominations ==
Year	Association	Category	Nominated work	Result
2016	MTV Video Music Awards Japan	BEST New Artist Video -Japan-	"Candy"	Nominated
