= Tokyo, OK =

Anime convention in the United States

Coordinates: 36°3′35″N 95°57′42″W

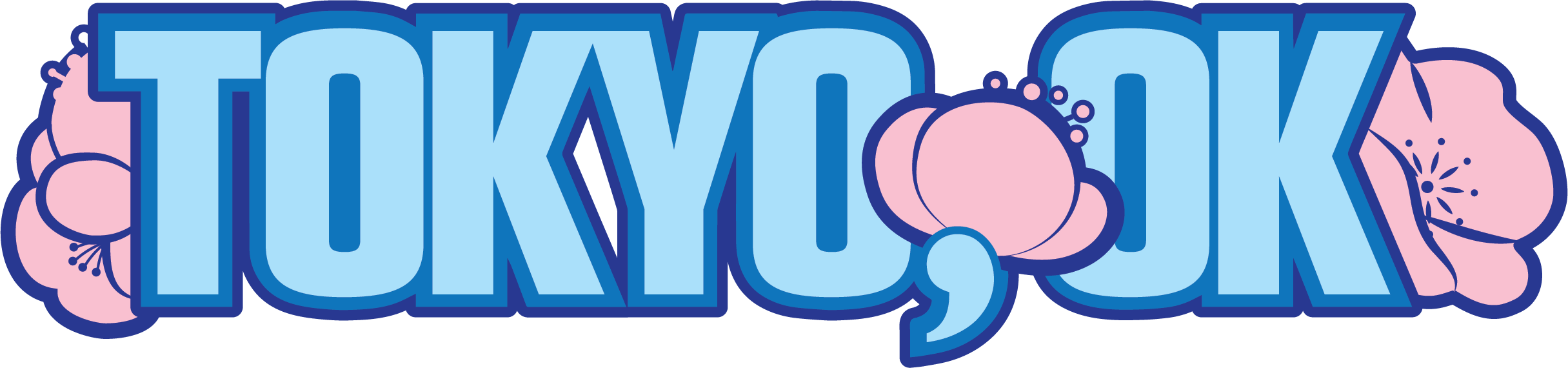
- Tokyo, OK Logo
- Status: Active
- Genre: Anime, Gaming, Japanese popular culture
- Venue: Marriott Tulsa Hotel Southern Hills
- Location: Tulsa, Oklahoma
- Country: United States
- Inaugurated: 2008
- Attendance: 2,640 in 2010
- Organizer: Oklahoma Society for Culture Appreciation (OS4CA)
- Website: https://www.oklahomaculture.org/

Tokyo, OK (Formerly Tokyo In Tulsa) is an annual four-day anime convention held during July at the Marriott Tulsa Hotel Southern Hills in Tulsa, Oklahoma. The convention is family friendly, and along with being an anime convention is Oklahoma's largest game event.

== Programming ==
The convention typically offers anime video rooms, artists' alley, collectible cards games, concerts, cosplay ball, costume competitions, LARP, panel discussions, rave, tabletop gaming, vendors, and video gaming (console, PC, arcade). In 2015, the convention had 50,000 sq ft of gaming space. In 2017 and 2021, the convention had more than 300 hours of programming.

== History ==
Tokyo In Tulsa began as a Halloween block party held in October 2005 for the Darkstone Anime Store in Tulsa. Attendance was estimated at 500 people. After the store closed in 2006 the event continued. Cassandra Hodges was scheduled to appear as a friend of the convention prior to her death in 2011.

In 2019, Tokyo In Tulsa moved to the Stoney Creek Hotel & Conference Center in Broken Arrow, Oklahoma. This move was due to construction at the Cox Business Center, and the facilities costs. The convention was spread out across five total venues, including a Hilton Garden Inn, XTreme Racing & Entertainment, the Broken Arrow Performing Arts Center, and a former Hobby Lobby. Shuttles were run by the convention between the venues. The vendor room was moved two weeks before the convention, and had serious issues including a lack of lighting. Tokyo in Tulsa 2020 was cancelled due to the COVID-19 pandemic.

Tokyo in Tulsa was renamed Tokyo, OK in January 2021. Tokyo, OK 2021 was moved from July to October due to the COVID-19 pandemic and the convention moved to the Hyatt Regency Tulsa Downtown in Tulsa, Oklahoma. Space from the Aloft Tulsa Downtown and Holiday Inn City Center was also utilized. The convention in 2022 continued to be at the Hyatt Regency, but also used space at 17West, Aloft, Courtyard, and Hyatt Place. Locations in 2023 included the Hyatt Regency Tulsa Downtown, 17West, and Cox Business Convention Center. Tokyo, OK moved to the Marriott Tulsa Hotel Southern Hills and also used the Ruffin Event Center in 2024.

== Event History ==
Dates	Location	Attendance	Guests
August 1–3, 2008	Crowne Plaza Hotel Tulsa; Tulsa, Oklahoma	1,804	Amelie Belcher, Crispin Freeman, Gary Friedrich, DJ Infam0us, Sara E. Mayhew, Wendy Powell, The Slants, Spike Spencer, and Team Royal Sabi.
July 10–12, 2009	Doubletree Hotel Tulsa-Downtown; Tulsa Convention Center; Tulsa, Oklahoma	2,118	Laura Bailey, Amelie Belcher, Rei Davidson, David Doub, Todd Haberkorn, Cassandra Hodges, DJ Infam0us, Samantha Inoue-Harte, The Last Dance, Nena Martinez, Vic Mignogna, Wendy Powell, Sephiroth, Sky Pirate, Spike Spencer, Dominic Vitucci, Aurelio Voltaire, Kent Williams, Travis Willingham, and Stephanie Young.
June 18–20, 2010	Doubletree Hotel Tulsa-Downtown; Tulsa Convention Center; Tulsa, Oklahoma	2,640	Amelie Belcher, Chris Cason, Samurai Dan Coglan, Rei Davidson, Clarine Harp, Cassandra Hodges, DJ Infam0us, Jeremy Inman, Scott McNeil, Randy Milholland, Jenny Pennington, Peter Pixie, Wendy Powell, Beauty Thibodeau, Eric Vale, Kent Williams.
July 15–17, 2011	Doubletree Hotel Tulsa-Downtown; Tulsa Convention Center; Tulsa, Oklahoma		Troy Baker, Leah Clark, Kaylee Fast, Freezepop, Todd Haberkorn, Yaya Han, Kyle Hebert, DJ Infam0us, K-Sides, Kevin McKeever, Peter Pixie, Monica Rial, Christopher Corey Smith, and Spike Spencer.
July 20–22, 2012	Tulsa Convention Center; Tulsa, Oklahoma		Joshua Adams, Steve Argyle, Chris Cason, Jillian Coglan, Samurai Dan Coglan, Kaylee Fast, Caitlin Glass, DJ HeavyGrinder, DJ Infam0us, Wendee Lee, Uke Li, Peter Pixie, Wendy Powell, Sephiroth, The Slants, Spike Spencer, Brooke Stephenson, J. Michael Tatum, Eric Wile, and Stephanie Young.
August 2–4, 2013	Tulsa Convention Center; Tulsa, Oklahoma	6,000 (est)	Terri Doty, DJ Infam0us, Jeremy Inman, DJ Jeffito, DJ Jimni Cricket, Kevin McKeever, Brina Palencia, Peter Pixie, Raj Ramayya, Ian Sinclair, J. Michael Tatum, Eric Wile, and Destrose.
July 11–13, 2014	Cox Business Center; Tulsa, Oklahoma	6,700 (est)	Jerry Bennett, Chalk Twins, Jillian Coglan, Samurai Dan Coglan, Cynthia Cranz, Terri Doty, FEMM, Imza, Jerry Jewell, Cherami Leigh, DJ MaRia, Peter Pixie, Wendy Powell, and J. Michael Tatum.
July 17–19, 2015	Cox Business Center; Tulsa, Oklahoma	8,000+	Amelie Belcher, Chris Bevins, Kira Buckland, Chris Cason, Jessica Cavanagh, Chalk Twins, Jillian Coglan, Samurai Dan Coglan, Kaylee Fast, Kyle Hebert, DJ Infam0us, Michele Knotz, Mika Kobayashi, Ryuu Lavitz, Kristen McGuire, Kevin McKeever, Peter Pixie, Wendy Powell, Rachel Robinson, Brooke Stephenson, and David Vincent.
July 15–17, 2016	Cox Business Center; Tulsa, Oklahoma		Nadia Baiardi, Amelie Belcher, Jessica Cavanagh, Chalk Twins, Eric Cherry, Leah Clark, Terri Doty, Kaylee Fast, Joel McDonald, Rachael Messer, MeteoroiD, Chris Patton, Peter Pixie, Wendy Powell, Brooke Stephenson, and J. Michael Tatum.
July 14–16, 2017	Cox Business Center; Tulsa, Oklahoma		Avanchick, Jessica Cavanagh, Chalk Twins, Eric Cherry, Kaylee Fast, Jessie James Grelle, Kristen McGuire, Rachael Messer, Keith Silverstein, The Slants, Saki Tachibana, Alexis Tipton, and Michael "Knightmage" Wilson.
July 13–15, 2018	Cox Business Center; Tulsa, Oklahoma		Chuck Huber, Jeremy Inman, Erica Lindbeck, Phil Mizuno, Cassandra Lee Morris, Peter Pixie, Ian Sinclair, and Jessica von Braun.
July 12–14, 2019	Stoney Creek Hotel & Conference Center; Four others venues Broken Arrow, Oklahoma		Dawn M. Bennett, Billy Kametz, Phil Mizuno, Xander Mobus, Peter Pixie, Wendy Powell, Jad Saxton, and Christopher Wehkamp.
October 15–17, 2021	Hyatt Regency Tulsa Downtown; Two others venues Tulsa, Oklahoma		Major Attaway, Ogawa Burukku, Bill Butts, Dani Chambers, Jim Foronda, Johnny N' Junkers, Marcus M. Mauldin, Madeleine Morris, and Oh My Sophii.
July 29–31, 2022	Hyatt Regency Tulsa Downtown; Three others venues Tulsa, Oklahoma	Around 4,500	Amber Lee Connors, Cole Feuchter, Wendy Powell, Pros and Cons Cosplay, John Swasey, Kiba Walker, Kent Williams, and Barry Yandell.
July 14–16, 2023	Hyatt Regency Tulsa Downtown; Two others venues Tulsa, Oklahoma		Bryn Apprill, Dani Chambers, Cole Feuchter, Emi Lo, Wendy Powell, Pros and Cons Cosplay, Kiba Walker, and Spencer Liles.
July 12–14, 2024	Marriott Tulsa Hotel Southern Hills; Tulsa, Oklahoma		Amelie Belcher, Cynthia Cranz, R. Bruce Elliott, Cole Feuchter, Tiffany Gordon, Chuck Huber, Marcus M. Mauldin, Brianna Roberts, Oscar Seung, Kiba Walker, Divine Creations, Cheeky Cheetah, Forged in Foam, and Tiffany Gordon.
July 10–13, 2025	Marriott Tulsa Hotel Southern Hills; Ruffin Event Center; Tulsa, Oklahoma		Elise Baughman, BCharlotteD, Cole Feuchter, Forged in Foam, Jessie James Grelle, Xanthe Huynh, Krystal Laporte, Brian Mathis, Barry Yandell, AshhDraws, Amelie Belcher, CheekyCheetah, and ShoxCosplay.
June 25–28, 2026	Marriott Tulsa Hotel Southern Hills; Ruffin Event Center; Tulsa, Oklahoma		Bryn Apprill, Aztech, Amelie Belcher, Ogawa Burukku, Forged in Foam, Shawn Gann, Jessie James Grelle, Veronica Laux, Wendy Powell, and Aaron Roberts.

== Community support ==
Tokyo, OK was recognized by the Tulsa Convention and Visitors Bureau and the Tulsa Hotel & Lodging Association in 2009 for its efforts in attracting tourism to the city of Tulsa. Fundraisers ranging from challenges, a photo suite, and a silent auction were held plus a portion of the conventions 2013 revenue went to the charity Bikers Against Child Abuse. In 2014, the Charity Ball, held pre-convention, along with other at convention donations benefited the Greenwood Cultural Center's Kids Korner. The 2021 ball benefited the Youth Services of Tulsa. Tokyo, OK's charities in 2023 included the Oklahoma Life Skills Association and Tulsa Special Kids Care. The 2025 charity ball and other events benefited Bikers Against Child Abuse.
