= Hitomi Kaji =

Hitomi Kaji 加治ひとみ
- Also known as: KAJI
- Born: 26 August 1987 (age 38); Tokyo, Japan
- Origin: Tokyo, Japan
- Genres: J-pop
- Occupations: Singer, songwriter
- Years active: 2012–present
- Label: Avex Trax
- Formerly of: KAJI on the INTELLIGENCE
- Website: avex.jp/kajihitomi/

Hitomi Kaji (加治ひとみ) is a Japanese pop singer, songwriter under the label Avex Trax.

== Biography ==
In 2012 March, the new J-pop duo KAJI on the INTELLIGENCE performed their at the Yokohama Arena as the opening act during the 14th Tokyo Girls Collection 2012 SPRING/SUMMER on 3 March just before their official debut. The duo consists of sound producer Hayato Tanaka and singer-songwriter KAJI. They released their debut digital single KARADA on 4 April 2012.

In 2014 September, avex held the TOKYO GIRLS AUDITION 2014. After going through various auditions and hardwork, Hitomi Kaji won the artist Grand Prix award. After which, her debut was decided and it was unveiled to 30,000 audiences on stage during the Tokyo Girls Collection 2015 SPRING / SUMMER. She visited the modelpress Japan and share her life experiences throughout the audition, apart from her outstanding singing talent and ability. Her debut mini album will be scheduled for release on 27 January 2016, with total of seven songs.

== Discography ==
=== Singles ===
Title	Release date
In My Hi-Heel / Eyes (アイズ)	3 August 2016

=== Split Singles ===
Title	Release date
(Valkyrie-戦乙女-/アイズ) (Valkyrie -Senotome- / Eyes) (with Wagakki Band)	24 June 2016

=== Digital Singles ===
Title	Release date
共犯者／タイムマシン (Kyouhansha / Time Machine)	28 May 2015
ルール違反 (Rule Ihan; Rule Violation)	27 September 2015
この夜を止めてよ (Kono Yoru wo Tomete yo; Stop this night)	24 November 2015
Flavor Of Life	9 December 2015
Let it shine	20 January 2016
奏 (かなで) (Kanade)	9 March 2016
アイズ (Eyes)	6 April 2016
Ti Amo	8 June 2016
ラヴソング (Love Song)	10 February 2017
My perfect sky	18 July 2018

=== Mini albums ===
Title	Release date	Chart position		Sales (Oricon)		Certification	Notes
Title	Release date	Oricon Weekly Albums Chart	Billboard Japan Hot 100	First week	Total	Certification	Notes
ルール違反 (Rule Ihan; Rule Violation)	27 January 2016	—	—	—	—	—	—
ラヴソング-special edition- (Love Song -special edition-)	13 July 2017	—	—	—	—	—	—
TROUBLE	23 August 2017	—	—	—	—	—	—

=== Albums ===
Title	Release date	Chart position		Sales (Oricon)		Certification	Notes
Title	Release date	Oricon Weekly Albums Chart	Billboard Japan Hot 100	First week	Total	Certification	Notes
NAKED	1 March 2017	287	—	—	—	—	—

=== Other appearances ===
List of non-studio album or guest appearances that feature Kaji Hitomi
Title	Year	Album
"CANDY GIRL" (feat. FEMM)	2018	90S & NEW REVIVAL

== Videography ==
=== Idol DVD ===
Title	Release date
加治ひとみ ひとみのなかに ("Kaji Hitomi Hitomi no naka ni"; Kaji Hitomi in Hitomi)	24 August 2007

== Music videos ==
Title	Official YouTube link	Single	Album	Year	Notes
タイムマシン	watch	共犯者 / タイムマシン	ルール違反	2015	–
タイムマシン	watch	共犯者 / タイムマシン	ルール違反	2015	New Music Video
共犯者	watch	共犯者 / タイムマシン	ルール違反	2015	–
ルール違反	watch	ルール違反/ ルール違反 - EP	ルール違反	2015	-
奏（かなで）	watch	奏	—N/a	2016	Cover of Sukima Switch
アイズ	watch	アイズ/ 「双星の陰陽師」オープニング&エンディングテーマ~Valkyrie-戦乙女- /アイズ~ / In My Hi-Heel/アイズ / Love Song (Special Edition) - EP	ルール違反	2016	Ending theme of anime “Twin Star Exorcists”
ラヴソング	watch	ラヴソング-special edition-EP	ルール違反	2017	Ending theme of drama “Tramps Like Us”
Ti Amo	watch	Ti Amo / In My Hi-Heel/アイズ	ルール違反	2018	–
In My Hi-Heel	watch	In My Hi-Heel/ In My Hi-Heel/アイズ	ルール違反	2018	–
My perfect sky	watch	My perfect sky	—N/a	2018	–
Candy	watch	Trouble- EP	—N/a	2018	–
プロローグ	watch	—N/a	—N/a	2020	To commemorate the release of the first photo book "Kaji Body."

== Bibliography ==
Title	Release date
かぢボディ。 (Kaji body.)	10 December 2020
かぢ習慣 (Kaji Shūkan; Kaji habit)	2 December 2022

== Filmography ==
=== Television ===
Title	Year	Role
サレタガワのブルー (Saretagawa no Blue)	2021	Suita (Lawyer)
