= Pow!/L.C.S. =

Pow/L.C.S.

EP by FEMM
- Released: February 3, 2016
- Recorded: 2013–2016 (Tokyo, Japan)
- Genre: Electronic dance music
- Length: 46:00
- Labels: Avex Music Creative Inc.; JPU Records; Maximum10
- Producers: Harry Sommerdahl; *Alex James Alex Ridha; Stace James; Fz; Invaderous & sfpr

FEMM chronology
Femm-Isation (Instrumental) (2014)	Pow/L.C.S. (2016)

Pow/L.C.S. (stylized as PoW!/L.C.S.) is the second extended play (EP) by Japanese–American female duo FEMM. It was released on February 3, 2016 by Avex Music Creative Inc. and February 23 that same year by Avex Music Creative and JPU Records. The EP is a follow-up companion to their debut album, Femm-Isation. FEMM worked with a few producers and writers such as Harry Sommerdahl, Alex Ridha, members of Invaderous & Sfpr, and others. Musically, Pow/L.C.S. is an electronic dance music EP with numerous musical elements including rap, R&B, and remix material. Originally to be released as a stand-alone EP, it was instead released in four formats; a stand alone CD, a digital release (not including the remixes), and two double album formats with Femm-Isation. The artwork for Pow/L.C.S. has FEMM on set of their music video "PoW!".

The material from Pow/L.C.S. received generally positive reviews from music critics. Many critics commended the album's commercial appeal, the clever lyric delivery, and the overall production and composition. The EP, alongside its accompanying singles and FEMM's visual imagery, achieved further attention through Asian and Western media. Two promotional singles were released from the album. The lead promotional single, "Pow!", was positively received from fans and critics alike, despite the lack of commercial achievement; This also attributed to the following single, "L.C.S.".

== Background and development ==
In early December 2015, FEMM confirmed in a press release through Avex Group Inc. that they would release their debut physical album, which was revealed to be entitled Pow!/L.C.S.. The announcement comes after FEMM's appearance at Japan's YouTube FanFest concert in November 2015. FEMM confirmed the EP would include two new tracks; "Pow!" and "L.C.S." and old remixes of their previous singles; they commented that they would add new re-edited versions of different tracks that did not appear on their debut studio, Femm-Isation (2014). In late January 2016, FEMM announced through a press release with Avex Group Inc. that they would release a double album in late February 2016 that included a physical copy of Femm-Isation. Regarding the material, FEMM agent Honey-B stated "The original order of the songs was already carefully mapped out, but this time round we got to put in segues in between songs which made a big difference. The songs flow so smoothly, it will seem like it all happens in a split second and like you have travelled in time."

The recording of the new material took place during late 2015, at Prime Sound Studios with Hideaki Junbu. FEMM worked with a few producers and writers for the new material such as Harry Sommerdahl, Alex Ridha, members of Invaderous & Sfpr, and additional production by Stace James. The re-edited and remixed material had been recorded from 2013 (with "UFO" being the first recorded track), up until September 2014 with the remix of "Whiplash". The Japanese version of "Astroboy" had been recorded at Maximum 10 Studio's with 70-Ki Ksow, FEMM's first recording outside of Prime Sound Studio's. Final mastering of the album was handled by Tom Coyle at Sterling Sound Studios in New York City.

== Composition ==
Pow/L.C.S. is an electronic dance album with numerous musical elements including rap, R&B, and remix material. The first track "Pow!" is a dance-pop song "packed with aggressive lyrics", and has been described as "one of the two brand new tracks incorporates a unique style that FEMM calls 'Twist and Twerk', combining the twosome's futuristic take on the twerk dance phenomena with that of classic 60's dance craze The Twist."

"L.C.S." is an abbreviation of the words" Lights, Camera, Satisfaction"; the song has been described as a "funky and hard floor tune...". FEMM's 2014 single "Astroboy" was recorded in Japanese language, marking the first time FEMM recorded in Japanese language; both FEMM's agents Honey-B and W-Trouble wrote partial parts of the lyrics because of it being sung in Japanese.

The rest of the tracks from the physical release include remixes of "Party All Night", "Kill the DJ", "Kiss the Rain", and "Whiplash". The EP features two new mixes: a remix of "Fxxk Boyz Get Money" and the video version of "UFO". "UFO" samples Japanese female duo Pink Lady's 1977 single of the same name.

The second disc features tracks from Femm-Isation; this album is primarily an electronic dance album with numerous elements of rap, synthpop, and J-pop.

== Release and packaging ==
Pow!/L.C.S. was released in four different formats on February 3 and February 23, 2016 by Avex Music Creative Inc. and JPU Records. The standalone CD features the ten tracks in a jewel case; first press editions features an obi strip. The double album packaging, which features Femm-Isation, features the ten tracks on a first disc, and thirteen tracks on the second disc. First press editions features an obi strip, front cover stickers showing accolades of the track "Pow!" and a bonus lyrical booklet in Japanese language. A second double album package features ten tracks on one disc, and the second disc includes a blank CD-R disc; the second disc is where people have the option to burn the digital release of Femm-Isation from its original October 2014 release. First press editions features an obi strip, front cover stickers showing accolades of the track "Pow!" and a bonus lyrical booklet in Japanese language. Both double album packages were released in singular jewel cases. The final format is the digital release, that includes only "Pow!", "L.C.S.", the Japanese version to "Astroboy", the remix to "Fxxk Boyz Get Money", and the video version of "UFO".

One artwork was issued for Pow!/L.C.S.; The cover sleeve features FEMM in front of enlarged mushrooms, superimposed on a pink backdrop. The artwork was shot whilst recording the music video to their single "Pow!", which features prominent themes of comic book–style and the pop art movement. The cover sleeve and photo shoot was photographed by Japanese photographer and designer Hideyuki Hashimoto, whilst the design production and art direction was handled by Japanese designer Midori Kawano. FEMM's outfit's, inspired by cosplay and its corresponding culture Otaku, were designed by GM Atelier designer Shoichiro Matsuoka; GM Atelier are responsible in designing several outfits for FEMM's music videos and photo shoots.

== Promotion ==
=== Remix singles ===
Despite no independent release of "UFO", the re-edited composition from Pow!/L.C.S. was used as the single release and was included in the accompanying music video. The extended edit was featured on their debut extended play Astroboy. The sfpr remix to "Party All Night" was released as the album's first promotional remix single on August 27, 2014, alongside their debut remix single overall. Despite its release, the song failed to enter any music charts. No video was made for the remix version, but an accompanying music video for the original composition was shot; its features FEMM in a futuristic world and in a small room. The Invaderous remix to "Kill the DJ" was released as the album's second promotional remix single on August 27, 2014. No music video was produced for this remix, but a video was released for the original version. The sfpr remix to "Whiplash", alongside the original and Invaderous remix, was released as the album's third equal promotional remix single on September 17, 2014, and third and fourth remix single respectively. Despite its release, the song failed to enter any music charts. No music video for either remix singles were issued, but an accompanying music video for the original composition was shot; its features FEMM in a black latex uniform, dancing with back-up dancers on a stage.

== Track list ==
PoW!/LCS + Femm-Isation; original album disc.
No.	Title	Writer(s)	Producer(s)	Length
1.	"PoW!"	Alex James Harry Sommerdahl Ylva Dimberg	Harry Sommerdahl Alex James	3:48
2.	"L.C.S."
3.	"Astroboy (Japanese version)" (featuring Honey-B and W-Trouble)	Brian Lee; Stuart Critchon; Ruby Rose	Lee	4:02
4.	"Fxxk Boyz Get Money (Invaderous Remix)"
5.	"Party All Night (sfpr Remix)"	Scott Stallone; Dan Book; Alexei Misoul	Stallone; Book; Misoul	4:50
6.	"Kill The DJ (Invaderous Remix)"	Jorge Mhondera; Ben Preston; Sofia Toufa	Preston	5:01
7.	"Kiss The Rain (sfpr Remix)"	Andreas Carlsson; Markus Bøgelund; Danielle Senior	Bøgelund	4:23
8.	"Astroboy (Invaderous Remix)" (featuring Honey-B and W-Trouble)	Lee; Critchon; Rose	Lee	5:23
9.	"Whiplash (sfpr Remix)"	Scott Cutler; Anne Preven; Priscilla Renea; Oliver Goldstein	Cutler; Preven; Renea; Goldstein	5:06
10.	"UFO (Original Mix)" (featuring Fz from sfpr vs Invaderous)	Shunichi Tokura; Yū Aku		6:55

Femm-Isation digital album.
No.	Title	Writer(s)	Producer(s)	Length
1.	"We Flood the Night"	Mark Weinberg; Tania Doko; Andrew Richard Smith	Weinberg; Smith	3:43
2.	"Astroboy"	Brian Lee; Stuart Critchon; Ruby Rose	Lee	4:02
3.	"Kill the DJ"	Jorge Mhondera; Ben Preston; Sofia Toufa	Preston	3:25
4.	"Party All Night"	Scott Stallone; Dan Book; Alexei Misoul	Stallone; Book; Misoul	3:38
5.	"The Real Thing"	Leah Haywood; Daniel James; Chris Rojas	Dreamlab	3:05
6.	"Dead Wrong"	Haywood; James; Kevin Ross	Dreamlab	2:32
7.	"Unbreakable"	Evan Bogart; Bryan Michael Cox; Emanual Kiriakou	Bogart; Cox; Kiriakou	3:55
8.	"Girls Night Out"	Brandon Lowery; Dan Omelio	Lowery; Omelio	3:06
9.	"Kiss the Rain"	Andreas Carlsson; Markus Bøgelund; Danielle Senior	Bøgelund	3:35
10.	"Fxxk Boyz Get Money"	Patrick Lukens; Nicole Tranquillo	Lukens; Tranquillo	3:06
11.	"White Noise"	Daniel Fält; Johannes Jorgensen; Grace Tither	GL Music	3:09
12.	"Whiplash"	Scott Cutler; Anne Preven; Priscilla Renea; Oliver Goldstein	Cutler; Preven; Renea; Goldstein	3:25
13.	"Wannabe"	Haywood; James	Dreamlab	2:39
Total length:				43:20

=== All formats ===
- Double album – Re-released under the title PoW!/LCS + Femm-Isation; Consists of ten tracks on one disc, and thirteen tracks from Femm-Isation on the second disc. Includes a bonus t-shirt and poster.

== Credits and personnel ==
Credits adapted from the liner notes of PoW!/LCS + Femm-Isation.

- Emily Kaiho – (FEMM band member; RiRi and Honey-B agent); lead vocals, backing vocals
- Hiro Todo – (FEMM band member; LuLa and W-Trouble agent); lead vocals, backing vocals
- Alex James - song writing, producing
- Mark Weinberg – song writing, producing
- Tania Doko – song writing
- Andrew Richard Smith – song writing, producing
- Brian Lee – song writing, producing
- Stuart Critchon – song writing
- Ruby Rose – song writing
- Jorge Mhondera – song writing
- Harry Sommerdahl - song writing, producing
- Ben Preston – song writing, producing
- Sofia Toufa – song writing
- Scott Stallone – song writing, producing
- Dan Book – song writing, producing
- Alexei Misoul – song writing, producing
- Leah Haywood – song writing
- Daniel James – song writing
- Chris Rojas – song writing
- Dreamlab – producing
- Evan Bogart – song writing, producing
- Bryan Michael Cox – song writing, producing
- Emanual Kiriakou – song writing, producing
- Brandon Lowery – song writing, producing
- Dan Omelio – song writing, producing
- Andreas Carlsson – song writing, producing
- Markus Bøgelund – song writing, producing
- Danielle Senior – song writing, producing
- Patrick Lukens – song writing, producing
- Nicole Tranquillo – song writing, producing
- Daniel Fält – song writing
- Johannes Jorgensen – song writing
- Grace Tither – song writing
- GL Music – producing
- Scott Cutler – song writing, producing
- Anne Preven – song writing, producing
- Priscilla Renea – song writing, producing
- Oliver Goldstein – song writing, producing
- Hideaki Jinbu – mixing, engineer
- Tom Coyne – mastering
- Invaderous – remixing
- Fz – (sfpr member) remixing
- Avex Trax – FEMM's record label
- Avex Entertainment Inc. – Femm's distribution label
