= Lol (Japanese group) =

Pop-music group

lol エルオーエル
- Years active: 2014 -2025
- Label: Avex Trax
- Members: Yusuke; Naoto; Hibiki; Honoka; Moca
- Website: http://avex.jp/lol/

lol (エルオーエル, Eru Ō Eru; pronounced El-oh-el) are a Japanese co-ed group under Avex Trax. They debuted on August 12, 2015, with the song "fire!". On June 1, 2025, the group disbanded 10 years after their debut.

== History ==
=== Debut ===
The group was formed in September 2014 by Avex Trax. Their name comes from the slang word "lol" meaning to "laugh out loud", thus producing their concept of wanting to be a group that makes people smile and can impress people as well.

Their song "Heartbeat" was used as the opening song for the anime "Tribe Cool Crew". Their song "Power of the Dream" was used as the 23rd opening song for the anime "Fairy Tail". Their single, "hikari" is used as the ending theme of Kamen Rider Heisei Generations: Dr. Pac-Man vs. Ex-Aid & Ghost with Legend Rider.

Their fan name is "lol family".

=== 2019: New single with collab ===
On June 5, 2019, lol announced the single "Brave Up!!", which was released on July 31, 2019, along with collab of DJ Koo.

== Members ==
Each member of "lol" was a trainee under "Avex Artist Academy".

Naoto Komiyama (小見山直人) was born on September 18, 1994, in Osaka. He was a member of the boy group "aLoval Boys WEST". He is the eldest of the group.

Yusuke Satou (佐藤友祐) was born on June 11, 1996, in Sapporo. He won the Actor Category in "Avex Audition MAX 2013".

Hibiki Kouketsu (纐纈響) (Stage name: Hibiki) was born on August 3, 1997, in Nagoya. She was a contestant as an artist on "Tokyo Girls Audition" 2014.

Honoka Aoki (青木ほのか) (Stage name: Honoka) was born on August 26, 1996, in Kyoto. She was a member of another co-ed group ARCUS.

Moka Asada (浅田萌花) (Stage name: Moca) was born on February 13, 2001, in Osaka. She was a member of the group LCM+ (ルミック). She was also a model for "Roni Girls Osaka". She is the youngest member with 7 years age gap to Naoto.

== Discography ==
=== Anime tracks ===
| No. | Title | Release date | Note |
|---|---|---|---|
| 1. | Heartbeat | October 8, 2014 | Used as the opening theme for the anime "Tribe Cool Crew". Short version of the song was released on the same day of the release. |
| 2. | Sync | December 14, 2016 | Used as the 3rd opening theme of the anime "Twin Star Exorcists" or "Sousei no Onmyouji". |
| 3. | Power of the Dream | October 5, 2018 October 21, 2018 | Used as the 23rd opening (first opening for the final series) of "Fairy Tail". Released in "power of the dream / Endless Harmony feat. LOREN" It was later released in their digital album "lml". |

=== Singles ===
| No. | Title | Release date | B-side track(s) | Note |
|---|---|---|---|---|
| 1. | Fire! | August 12, 2015 | Shake Shake | Fire was used as the opening theme for Japanese TV series "Buzz Rhythm" |
| 2. | Ladi Dadi | January 27, 2016 | Follow Me | Ladi Dadi was used as the ending theme for Japanese TV series "Buzz Rhythm" |
| 3. | Spank!! | June 29, 2016 | Girl is Mine Brand New Story | Spank!! was used as the opening theme for Japanese TV series "Buzz Rhythm" |
| 4. | Bye Bye | December 14, 2016 | Sync Gimme Gimme | The track Sync was used as the third opening for Japanese anime series "Sousei no Onmyouji" (Twin star exorcists) |
| 5. | Boyfriend / Girlfriend | April 19, 2017 | Party Up!! | "Boyfriend" and "Girlfriend" are two different songs with separate MVs. |
| 6. | Aitai Kimochi / nanana | December 6, 2017 | Think of You | |
| 7. | Ice Cream / Wasurenai | March 21, 2018 | Color of Love Hello | "Ice Cream" and "Wasurenai" are two different songs with separate MVs. |
| 8. | love & smile | July 11, 2018 | Playback Starlight | |
| 9. | Sayonara no Kisetsu / lolli-lolli | March 20, 2019 | Special love trigger | "Sayonara no Kisetsu" and "lolli-lolli" are two different songs. |
| 10. | brave up!! | July 31, 2019 | like that!! bring back | like that!! will be used as the opening song for "Kakafukaka". bring back will be used as the opening song "Pochitto Hatsumei Pikachin Kitto" |

=== Digital singles ===
| No. | Title | Release date | Note |
|---|---|---|---|
| 1. | Xmas Kiss | December 14, 2016 | Christmas song for lovers who can't meet at Christmas. |
| 2. | Party Up!! | February 14, 2017 | Theme of the song is "Girls Talk" Was used as the CM song for ad "Housing Information Centre" |

=== Digital album ===
| No. | Title | Release date | B-side track(s) | Note |
|---|---|---|---|---|
| 1. | love & smile | June 20, 2018 | Playback Starlight Melody | |
| 2. | 90s & NEW REVIVAL | August 15, 2018 | EZ DO DANCE／lol-エルオーエル- CANDY GIRL／加治ひとみ feat. FEMM FACES PLACES／Beverly 恋心／Yup’in Feelin' Good～It's PARADISE／FAKY EZ DO DANCE／TRF CANDY GIRL／hitomi FACES PLACES／globe 恋心／相川七瀬 Feelin' Good～It's PARADISE／DA PUMP | Avex Hit Songs EZ DO DANCE - lol cover - track 1 |
| 3. | lml | October 21, 2018 | ice cream trigger nanana power of the dream just go!! aitai kimochi melody love & smile 3 pieces playback yume no mukou wasurenai xmas kiss with u | |

=== Album ===
| No. | Title | Release date | Tracks | Notes |
|---|---|---|---|---|
| 1. | lolol | August 2, 2017 | the wave (intro) perfect summer boyfriend party up!! shhh... girl is mine fire! ladi dadi catch the wave (interlude) hanauta girlfriend blue ocean spank!! hikari brand new story bye bye | |
