= Femm-Isation =

Studio album by FEMM
- Released: October 1, 2014
- Recorded: 2013–2014
- Studio: Avex Studios (Tokyo); Prime Sound Studios (Tokyo)
- Genre: Electronic dance music
- Length: 43:20
- Language: English
- Label: Avex Entertainment Inc.; Maximum10
- Producer: Mark Weinberg; Andrew Richard Smith; Brian Lee; Ben Preston; Scott Stallone; Dan Book; Alexei Misoul; Dreamlab; Evan Bogart; Bryan-Michael Cox; Emanuel Kiriakou; Brandon Lowery; Dan Omelio; Markus Bøgelund; Patrick Lukens; Nicole Tranquillo; GL Music; Scott Cutler; Anne Preven; Priscilla Renea; Oliver Goldstein

FEMM chronology
Astroboy (2014)	Femm-Isation (2014)	Pow!/L.C.S. (2016)

Singles from Femm-Isation
- 1. "Wannabe" Released: April 16, 2014; 2. "Kiss the Rain" Released: April 30, 2014; 3. "White Noise" Released: May 7, 2014; 4. "We Flood the Night" Released: May 14, 2014; 5. "Kill the DJ" Released: May 28, 2014; 6. "Fxxk Boyz Get Money" Released: July 30, 2014; 7. "Dead Wrong" Released: August 27, 2014; 8. "Unbreakable" Released: September 17, 2014

Femm-Isation (stylised in as FEMM-Isation) is the debut studio album by Japanese duo FEMM (previously known as Far East Mention Mannequins). Maximum10 and Avex Inc. released it digitally on October 1, 2014, and Avex Trax reissued it as a double album on February 3, 2016, alongside the group's extended play Pow!/L.C.S.. After forming in 2013 and releasing their debut extended play Astroboy (2014), Avex Trax enlisted several collaborators to work on new music for FEMM, including Mark Weinburg, Andrew Richard Smith, Dreamlab, Emanuel Kiriakou, and Dan Omelio, among others.

Musically, the album focuses on a variety of electronic dance music sounds, along with elements of post-disco, electro house, dance-pop, and slower tracks. Thematically, the group is based on two Japanese "mannequins" roaming the streets of Tokyo, saving mannequins all over the world. Furthermore, the album's content and visuals explore various cultures and aesthetics, particularly those of Japanese Otaku and American culture. Music critics praised Femm-Isation for its sound, production quality, and overall concept, as well as the group's fashion and aesthetic.

Femm-Isation was not commercially successful, failing to chart in Japan. However, it peaked at number ten on the US Billboard World Albums chart. Each track on the album received an accompanying music video, with nine of the songs released as digital singles. Despite not charting, many of the songs received attention from music publications and went viral on social media, particularly "Kill the DJ" and "Fxxk Boyz Get Money". To promote the album, FEMM appeared at a number of concerts and events throughout Japan, Europe and North America.

== Background and content ==
In late 2013, Avex Inc. formed FEMM as a concept group, which included Emily Kaiho (as RiRi) and Todo Hiro (as LuLa). They were signed to Avex's division label Maximum10 and marketed by Avex Music Creative Inc. The concept was documented on their YouTube channel, with a video of RiRi and LuLa walking around Tokyo's streets and talking about their mission to rescue mannequins. Furthermore, RiRi and LuLa created alter-egos Honey-B and W-Trouble. This teaser was used to launch FEMM's website, which communicates with fans via interactive elements. To promote their debut, they released the extended play Astroboy (2014), which features a cover of "UFO" by Japanese band Pink Lady, among other songs.

Following the release of Astroboy in Japan, Avex Inc. enlisted several collaborators to create new music for FEMM, including Mark Weinburg, Andrew Richard Smith, Dreamlab, Emanuel Kiriakou, and Dan Omelio, among others. FEMM and mixer Hideaki Jinbu began recording the album at Avex Studios and Prime Sound Studios in Japan throughout 2014. According to FEMM, neither member had any professional singing experience, so recording and appearing in a music video for "Astroboy" as their agents proved to be difficult. In addition, Femm-Isation is one of Avex Inc.'s first entirely English-language albums. Following the recording sessions, Tom Coyne mastered the album's tracks at Sterling Studios in New York City, New York.

Femm-Isation is an electronic dance album. Avo Magazine's Peter Dennis described the album as having a "purely electronic dance music flavour," while CDJournal described it as EDM and dance-oriented. Greg Hignight from J Generation felt the albums contributed to a "bold new vision in J-Pop": he noted various genres and sounds including synth numbers ("We Flood the Night", "Wannabe"), post-disco ("Astroboy"), dancehall ("Dead Wrong"), slower tracks ("The Real Thing", "Unbreakable"), a blend of electro house, synthpop, and electronic music ("Kill the DJ", "Party All Night", "Kiss the Rain", "Whiplash"), and influences of American-infused culture (""Fxxk Boyz Get Money”).

== Promotion ==
=== Singles and other songs ===

The music videos to "Kill the DJ" (above) and "Fxxk Boyz Get Money" (below), featuring various fashions and concepts inspired by Japanese otaku culture.

Nine tracks from Femm-Isation were released as singles. On April 16, 2014, "Wannabe" was released as the album's lead single, and it was accompanied by two different music videos: the first featured FEMM being spray painted to immolate body art in the middle of a street, and the second featured FEMM dancing to the song inside a white studio. On April 30, 2014, "Kiss the Rain" was released as the album's second single, accompanied by a steampunk-inspired music video featuring FEMM. "White Noise" was released as the album's third single on May 7, 2014, and its music video features FEMM dancing to the song and performing in latex body suits in front of various visuals. "We Flood the Night" was released as the album's fourth single on May 14, 2014. It features FEMM as mannequin dolls in a still position, as well as various graphics and underwater visuals.

On May 28, 2014, "Kill the DJ" was released as the album's fifth single, accompanied by a music video featuring FEMM in a latex cadet and nurse uniform, dancing and fighting to the song. The visual drew attention from both Japanese and Western media, who praised the emphasis on Japanese otaku culture. "Fxxk Boyz Get Money" was released as the album's sixth single on July 30, 2014, along with a music video featuring FEMM in latex maid outfits dancing and twerking to the track. The song and music video received international feedback and attention, becoming a viral sensation. On August 27, 2014, the album's seventh single, "Party All Night," was released, and its music video featured FEMM dancing in a small room as well as in a futuristic world.

On August 27, 2014, "Dead Wrong" was released as the album's eighth single, with a music video featuring FEMM performing the song in traditional Japanese kimono in front of computer generated imagery. On September 17, 2014, "Unbreakable" was released as the album's ninth and final single, featuring FEMM in a still pose surrounding a black piano while singing the song. Four individual remixes were released to promote the songs "Kill the DJ", "Party All Night" and "Whiplash", all remixed by Sfpr and Invaderous. A music video for the original edit of "Whiplash" was also released on the group's YouTube channel, with FEMM dressed in latex and dancing to the song with backup dancers. In addition, music videos for the album tracks "The Real Thing" and "Girls Night Out" were uploaded to YouTube.

=== Live performances ===
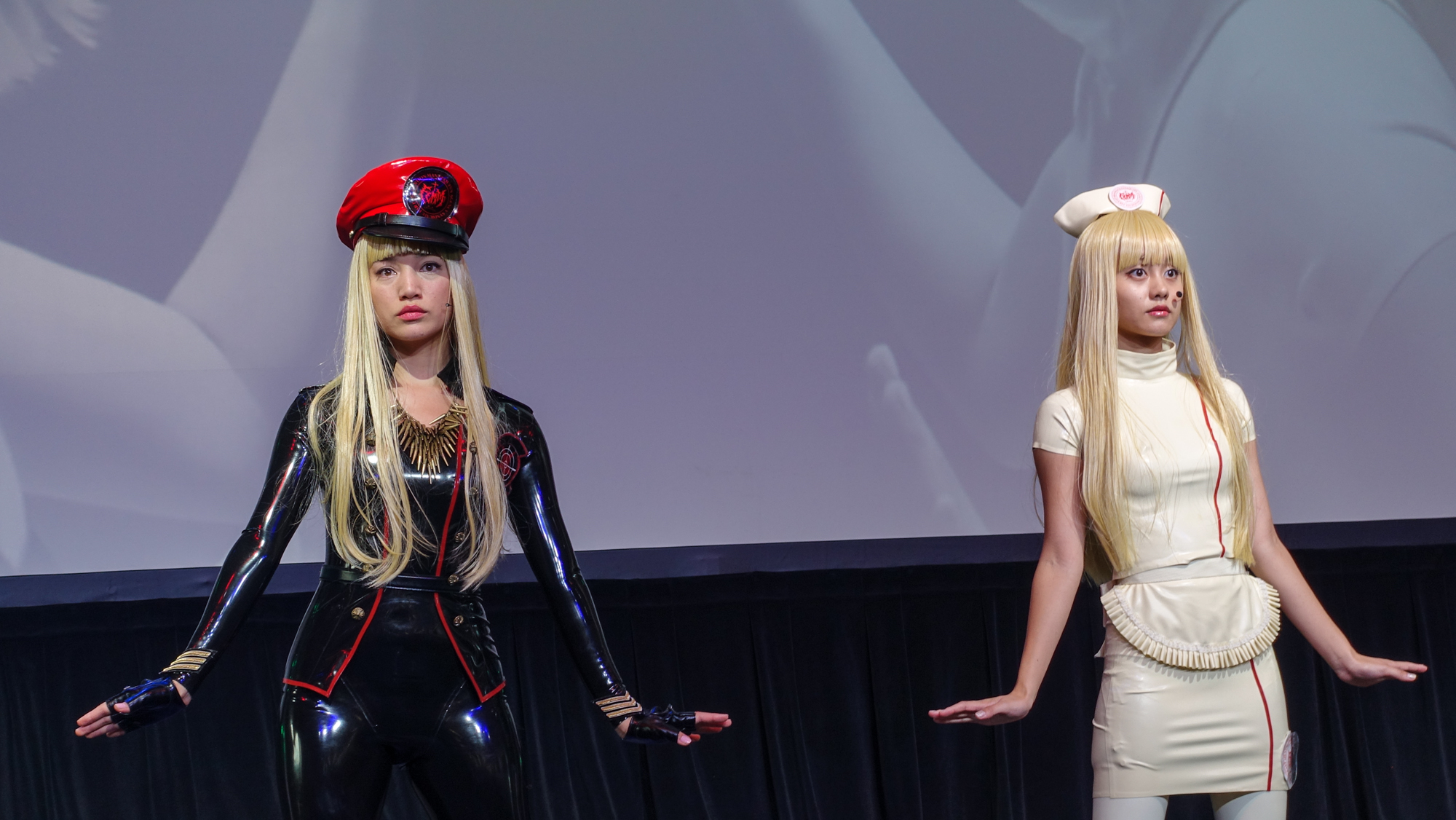
FEMM at J-Pop Summit 2015 in San Francisco; RiRi (left), LuLa (right)

Femm promoted Femm-Isation at numerous concert gigs and events. FEMM made their live performance debut at Tokyo's Baamm in Shinkiba. FEMM made their North American debut in mid-July 2014, performing at the Tokyo in Tulsa anime convention in Oklahoma. FEMM's second major performance was at Tokyo's newly hosted Twerk 'Em All; this was the host party for FEMM's single "Fxxk Boyz Get Money" as well as previous material. FEMM performed a one-night only show for Dutch recording artist and songwriter Eva Simons' Japanese leg tour, and the next day, they performed all of the album tracks at their Femm-Isation Vol.3 concert at Hatsudai Tamai Hospital.

FEMM performed at Tokyo's annual Ultra Music Festival alongside electronic musicians Afrojack, Alesso, Fedde Le Grand, Kaskade, and Martin Garrix, among others; this was the band's first live festival performance. FEMM appeared at the Versace after-party in Tokyo and several other concerts until December 2014. In August 2015, the duo returned to the United States to perform at Rage, a gay bar and dance club in West Hollywood, California. They also performed at the J-Pop Summit in San Francisco, alongside other Japanese artists such as Eir Aoi, JAM Project, Gacharic Spin, and others. The group's final performance promoting Femm-Isation occurred at the 2015 YouTube FanFest Japan, a live streaming event featuring YouTube personalities and artists.

== Release and reception ==
Professional ratings
Review scores
Source	Rating
Complete Music Update	(positive)
CDJournal	(positive)
J Generation	(positive)

On October 1, 2014, Maximum10 and Avex Music Creative Inc released Femm-Isation as a digital download with 13 tracks. Photographed by Akira Takahaski and Osanu Unosawa, the cover art depicts the band in gas masks holding the title "Far East Mention Mannequins," the group's previous name, similar concept to the music video for their single "Wannabe". On December 24, the same year, the instrumental version of the album was made available digitally. On December 11, 2015, FEMM announced the release of Pow!/L.C.S., billed as their major debut with Avex Trax and JPU Records. Both the EP and Femm-Isation were repackaged as a double album, available in both physical and digital formats. A third CD format included a blank CD-R disc, allowing customers who purchased the digital version before it was re-issued to burn it to the blank CD.

Music critics praised Femm-Isation. Andy Malt from Complete Music Update praised the albums sound in compared to the bands nonsensical imagery, saying, "Thankfully, the musical side makes more sense. Over the last seven months they’ve released fourteen globally-minded pop tracks onto YouTube, all of which make up their debut album, Femm-Isation." Greg Hignight of J Generation praised the overall production and star quality of each track, saying, "My pick for the J-Pop album of 2014 is Femm-Isation, a celebration of the artificial aspiring to something more genuine, and in the process, delivering some of the most exciting and original music to come out of the Japanese pop scene in years." Molly Osbery of Vice did not review the album, but she did praise the producers and songwriters from their material for being hidden pioneers in popularising the group, as she felt producers were now more "the front men". Despite not reviewing the album, Corynn Smith of MTV Iggy praised the majority of the album's composition and singles, particularly their English language skills. That same year, MTV Iggy dubbed FEMM an "Artist to Watch".

Femm-Isation failed to chart in Japan. However, it peaked at number ten on the US Billboard World Albums chart, becoming the second Japanese entry after Shintaro Sakamoto's Love if Possible (2016). It remains the band's only charted effort to date.

== Track listing ==
Femm-Isation track list.
No.	Title	Writer(s)	Producer(s)	Length
1.	"We Flood the Night"	Mark Weinberg; Tania Doko; Andrew Richard Smith	Weinberg; Smith	3:43
2.	"Astroboy"	Brian Lee; Stuart Critchon; Ruby Rose	Lee	4:02
3.	"Kill the DJ"	Jorge Mhondera; Ben Preston; Sofia Toufa	Preston	3:25
4.	"Party All Night"	Scott Stallone; Dan Book; Alexei Misoul	Stallone; Book; Misoul	3:38
5.	"The Real Thing"	Leah Haywood; Daniel James; Christopher Rojas	Dreamlab	3:05
6.	"Dead Wrong"	Haywood; James; Kevin Ross	Dreamlab	2:32
7.	"Unbreakable"	Evan Bogart; Bryan-Michael Cox; Emanuel Kiriakou	Bogart; Cox; Kiriakou	3:55
8.	"Girls Night Out"	Brandon Lowery; Dan Omelio	Lowery; Omelio	3:06
9.	"Kiss the Rain"	Andreas Carlsson; Markus Bøgelund; Danielle Senior	Bøgelund	3:35
10.	"Fxxk Boyz Get Money"	Patrick Lukens; Nicole Tranquillo	Lukens; Tranquillo	3:06
11.	"White Noise"	Daniel Fält; Johannes Jorgensen; Grace Tither	GL Music	3:09
12.	"Whiplash"	Scott Cutler; Anne Preven; Priscilla Renea; Oliver Goldstein	Cutler; Preven; Renea; Goldstein	3:25
13.	"Wannabe"	Haywood; James	Dreamlab	2:39
Total length:				43:20

== Credits and personnel ==
Personnel details were sourced from the Femm-Isation liner notes booklet.

Musicians and technical

- Emily Kaiho – (as RiRi and Honey-B); lead vocals, backing vocals
- Hiro Todo – (as LuLa and W-Trouble); lead vocals, backing vocals
- Hideaki Jinbu – mixing, engineer
- Tom Coyne – mastering
- Invaderous – remixing
- Fz – (Sfpr member) remixing

Production

- Mark Weinberg – songwriting, producing
- Tania Doko – songwriting
- Andrew Richard Smith – songwriting, producing
- Brian Lee – songwriting, producing
- Stuart Critchon – songwriting
- Ruby Rose – songwriting
- Jorge Mhondera – songwriting
- Ben Preston – songwriting, producing
- Sofia Toufa – songwriting
- Scott Stallone – songwriting, producing
- Dan Book – songwriting, producing
- Alexei Misoul – songwriting, producing
- Leah Haywood – songwriting
- Daniel James – songwriting
- Christopher Rojas – songwriting, producing
- Dreamlab – producing
- Evan Bogart – songwriting, producing
- Bryan Michael Cox – songwriting, producing
- Emanual Kiriakou – songwriting, producing
- Brandon Lowery – songwriting, producing
- Dan Omelio – songwriting, producing
- Andreas Carlsson – songwriting, producing
- Markus Bøgelund – songwriting, producing
- Danielle Senior – songwriting, producing
- Patrick Lukens – songwriting, producing
- Nicole Tranquillo – songwriting, producing
- Daniel Fält – songwriting
- Johannes Jorgensen – songwriting
- Grace Tither – songwriting
- GL Music – producing
- Scott Cutler – songwriting, producing
- Anne Preven – songwriting, producing
- Priscilla Renea – songwriting, producing
- Oliver Goldstein – songwriting, producing

Visuals

- Sayaka Ide - art directing
- Akira Takahashi - photography
- Osamu Unosawa - photography
- Ossamu - hair and makeup
- Yu-ki Akagi - hair and makeup
- Shoichiro Matsuoka - costuming
- Cook One - logo designing

== Charts ==
Weekly chart performance for Femm-Isation
Chart (2014)	Peak position
US World Albums (Billboard)	10

== Release history ==
Region	Date	Format(s)	Label	Ref.
Various	October 1, 2014	Digital download; streaming	Avex Inc.; Maximum10	
Japan	February 3, 2016	2CD; digital download; streaming	Avex Trax	
United Kingdom	February 3, 2016	2CD	JPU Records	
