= FEMM (duo) =

Japanese electronic dance music duo

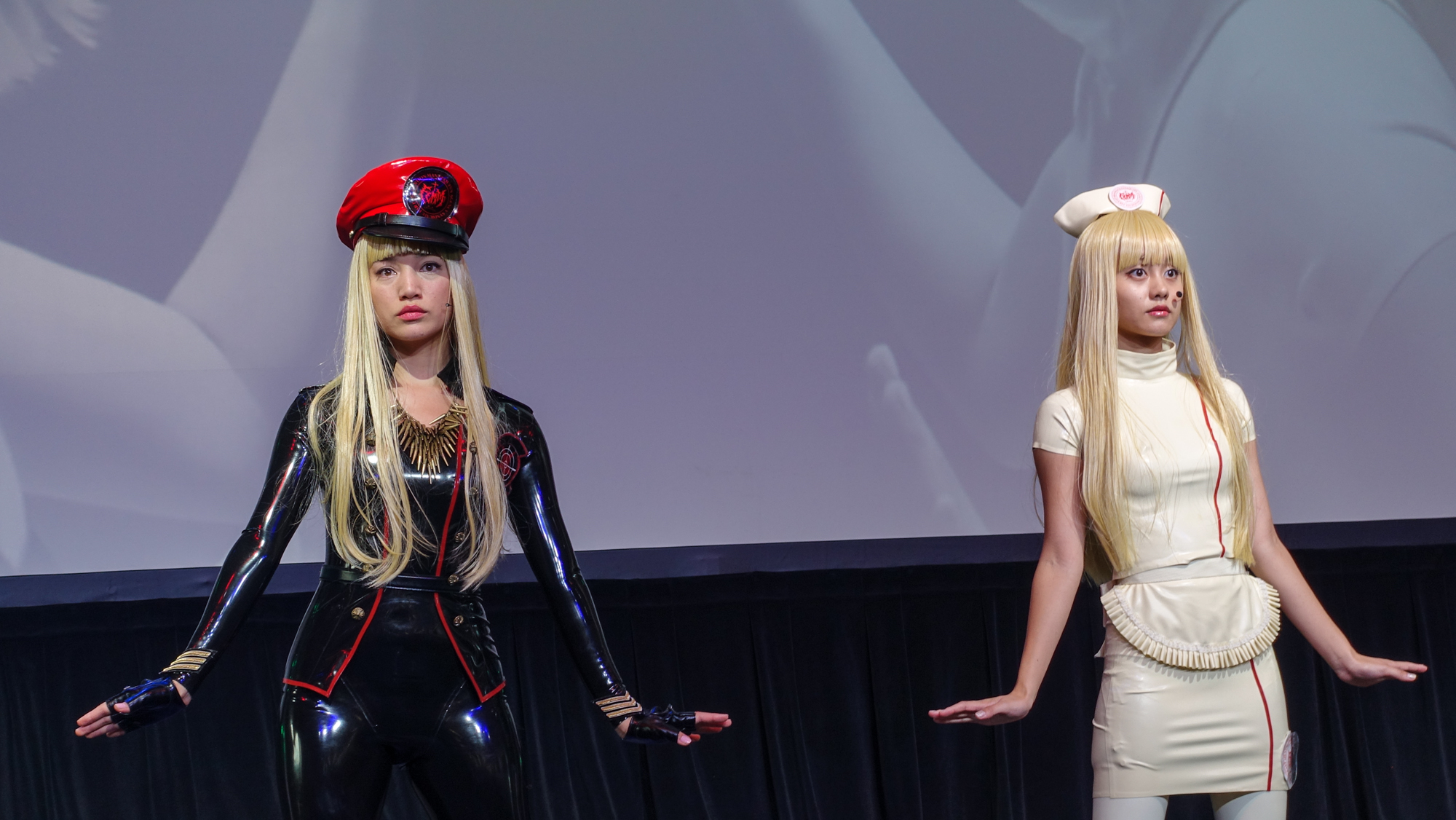
- FEMM at J-Pop Summit 2015 in San Francisco. From left to right; RiRi and LuLa.

Background information
- Origin: Tokyo, Japan
- Genres: Electronic dance music; pop; electropop; techno; dance-pop
- Years active: 2013–2023
- Labels: Avex Music Creative Inc.; Maximum10; JPU Records
- Members: RiRi; LuLa
- Website: Femms.jp

FEMM (sometimes recognized as an abbreviation for Far East Mention Mannequins) was a Japanese electronic dance music duo, composed of Emily "RiRi" Kaiho and Todo "LuLa" Hiro. The group signed with the Avex Group Holdings Inc. sub-record label Maximum10 and their distributing label Avex Music Creative Inc.; they signed a deal with London label JPU Records for European distribution. After a series of singles between 2013 and 2014, FEMM released their debut studio album Femm-Isation in October 2014 as a digital release. FEMM's major debut and first physical release, Pow!/L.C.S., was released in February 2016.

FEMM is a music project that portrays "real-life mannequins", with RiRi and LuLa acting as the leaders of the FEMM Agency Syndicate, an agency that supports the independence and rights of mannequins (hypothetically their fan base). RiRi is managed by agent Honey-B, and LuLa is managed by agent W-Trouble. Portrayed by the same performers as their alter egos, Honey-B and W-Trouble communicate on RiRi and LuLa's behalf.

Despite the group's lack of charting success, FEMM have received coverage by several Western websites. The group has been widely commended for their fashion style and commercial appeal. FEMM have been cited as the world's "first mannequin duo", and have been highlighted by publications including The Huffington Post, Marquis, and Perez Hilton.

== Career ==
=== 2013–early 2014: Formation and early work ===
FEMM consists of RiRi and LuLa. Little is known about FEMM's formation or meeting prior to being signed; in an interview on February 24, 2016, W-Trouble stated that her and Honey-B "met at FEMM's Agency Syndicate. Details are top secret." In October 2013, the group launched a YouTube channel and uploaded a teaser video; The video shows RiRi and LuLa walking around the streets of Japan, talking about their quest of rescuing mannequins. This teaser was used to launch FEMM's website, which uses interactive elements to communicate with their fanbase. FEMM signed with the Avex Group Holdings Inc. sub-record label Maximum10 and their distributing label Avex Music Creative Inc.

In February 2014, FEMM premiered two music videos; "UFO" and "Astroboy" on their YouTube channel; the former track is a cover song originally recorded in 1977 by Japanese pop duo Pink Lady, whilst the latter track featured guest vocals from FEMM's agents, Honey-B and W-Trouble. Despite the initial lack of popularity, FEMM included both songs in the group's debut extended play (EP) Astroboy on April 2, 2014. "Astroboy" was recognized by Western critics as FEMM's first original song by the group. The videos were directed by creative unit IKIOI, who had previously worked with other Japanese artists at the time.

=== Mid-2014–2015: Femm-Isation, international recognition, and further promotion ===
On April 12, 2014, FEMM released their debut single, "Wannabe", from their then-upcoming studio album. This marked their first single handled by Western producers and composers; "Wannabe" was produced by Australian production team Dreamlab, and Avex Music Creative Inc. hired several more Western producers for the album. The second, third, and fourth singles from the album; "Kiss the Rain", "White Noise", and "We Flood the Night" were released on April 30, May 7 and 14 that same year. Avex Music Creative Inc. had hired European producers, such as Swedish producer Andreas Carlsson and Danish production team GL Music. At the end of May, FEMM released their fifth single "Kill the DJ" alongside an accompanying music video on their YouTube channel. The music video, alongside the recording, was the beginning of FEMM's international recognition and received a large amount of favourable feedback, praising the concept, its convenient use of cosplay and otaku culture, and choreography. In June 2014, FEMM premiered their sixth single "Fxxk Boyz Get Money" onto YouTube, and released it a month later on July 30 through iTunes Store. The song was critically acclaimed from many music critics, many whom praised the song's commercial nature and lyrical message. An accompanying music video was shot for the single; its features FEMM singing and twerking in an overlapped lyric video. The video received a large amount of favourable feedback, and attracted large attention from several online figures including American blogger and journalist Perez Hilton, American YouTube star Miles Jai, among others. Due to its increasing popularity, the song was featured on the Twerk' em All compilation in July that same year, and gained more international fans from all over the world. In November 2015, "Fxxk Boyz Get Money" surpassed one million views on YouTube; this marks FEMM's highest viewed and first video to reach the one million mark. In mid-July 2014, the duo performed at Tokyo in Tulsa, an anime convention in Oklahoma, which was their first performance in North America.

After the success and increasing popularity of "Kill the DJ" and "Fxxk Boyz Get Money", Avex Music Creative Inc. continued to hire several producers and composers from different European, Oceanic and North American regions. FEMM collaborated with American producer's and songwriter's Dan Book and Alexei Misoul on "Party All Night", the seventh single from their then-upcoming studio album. FEMM released their eighth single "Dead Wrong" on August 27 through iTunes Store. The single was produced by New Zealand-born Australian musician Leah Haywood, and accompanying producers Daniel James and Kevin Ross. "Unbreakable" served as FEMM's ninth single from the then-upcoming studio album, and was singled out as the only ballad by Honey-B and W-Trouble; the latter agent highlighted it as LuLa's favourite single. FEMM released their final single from the album, entitled "Whiplash". FEMM announced the release of their debut studio album, Femm-Isation, and was released on October 3 that same year. Despite the lack of success in their native Japan, Femm-Isation reached the top ten on the US Billboard World Albums chart; this marks FEMM's first charting release to date. The instrumental version of the album was released on December 24 through iTunes Store.

FEMM promoted the album and its accompanying singles with performances at small clubs or other public events in Japan. FEMM were part of a one-night only show for the Japanese leg tour of Dutch recording artist and songwriter Eva Simons, and FEMM performed all the album tracks on their Femm-Isation Vol.3 concert the following day; this gig was hosted at Hatsudai Tamai Hospital. FEMM performed alongside electronic musicians Afrojack, Alesso, Fedde Le Grand, Kaskade, and Martin Garrix amongst others at the annual Ultra Music Festival in Tokyo; this was FEMM's first musical performance at a live festival tour. FEMM performed at the Versace after party in Tokyo, and performed on several other concert gigs until December 2014. In August 2015, FEMM returned to the U.S. to perform at Rage, a gay bar and dance club in West Hollywood, California. In the same weekend, they were headline acts at the J-Pop Summit in San Francisco along with other Japanese music acts such as Eir Aoi, JAM Project, and Gacharic Spin, amongst others.

The group's final performance promoting material from Femm-Isation was for the 2015 YouTube FanFest Japan, where YouTube personalities and artists gathered together for a live streaming event. The duo introduced their new song, "PoW!", which was a returning track from their live performances. FEMM also released a collaboration music video with Japanese girl group FAKY with a Japanese cover of Sak Noel's "No Boyfriend" on the producer's YouTube channel on November 27, 2015.

=== 2016: Pow!/L.C.S. and other ventures ===
In early December 2015, FEMM confirmed in a press release through Avex Group Inc. that they would release their debut physical album, which was revealed to be entitled Pow!/L.C.S.. FEMM confirmed the EP would include two new tracks; the studio version of "Pow!", and "L.C.S.", alongside old remixes of their previous singles; they commented that they would add new re-edited versions of different tracks that didn't appear on their debut studio. In late January 2016, FEMM announced through a press release with Avex Group Inc. that they would release a double album in late February 2016 that included a physical copy of Femm-Isation. Regarding the material, FEMM agent Honey-B stated "The original order of the songs was already carefully mapped out, but this time round we got to put in segues in between songs which made a big difference. The songs flow so smoothly, it will seem like it all happens in a split second and like you have travelled in time." On February 3, Pow!/L.C.S. was released digitally through iTunes Stores and served a physical released on February 23. The music videos to "Pow!" and "L.C.S." premiered on FEMM's YouTube channel in January and February 2016. On April 27, 2016, they re-released YouTube videos of "White Noise" and "Whiplash" with minor changes to lyrics and new camera angles. On the same day, FEMM, FAKY and Yup'in were confirmed to be in a new Avex project group called "FAMM'IN" and released their first digital EP, FAMM'IN and music video of their title song, "Circle" on YouTube.

=== 2017: 80s/90s J-Pop Revival project ===
In May 2017, FEMM released a single, "Do It Again", that featured American songwriter Liz. In mid 2017, FEMM launched a project called "80s/90s J-Pop Revival" with a double A-side cover single, "My Revolution / Konyaha Boogie Back|今夜はブギー・バック (nice vocal)", which was released in September. It featured members from FAKY and Yup'in. It was followed by another single a week later and a cover album with the same name in October.

As a way to promote the singles, "Falling For A Lullaby", a B-side from "My Revolution" was used in an advertisement for the Karuizawa Prince Shopping Plaza. FEMM also performed at venues including Hyper Japan.

=== 2018-2020: dollhouse ===
In 2018, FEMM released "dollhouse" which included two recorded songs and a few instrumentals. To commemorate the EP, two live performances were held. "ADIRECTOR Vol.1『DOLLHOUSE』" was their first Oneman live, but also an interactive art exhibition at Omotesando B SPACE, occupying 4 floors of the pink building between August 4 and 27.

In the same year, they released, "Dolls Kill", featuring Japanese Hip-hop artist, Elle Teresa.

In 2019, FEMM released their digital single, "Shibuya Ex Horologium". The lyrics were created by AI Rinna, who curated the impressions of the live performance posted on Twitter and used them as inspiration.

In October 2020, FEMM released the final single, "Chewing Gum Cleaner", before erasing all content from their platforms.

=== 2020-2022: FEMM 2.0., 404 Not Found, Tokyo Girls Anthem and Tokyo Ex Machina ===
In November 2020, FEMM announced that they were going to 'upgrade' to FEMM Version 2.0. and teased the song "Level Up" featuring Duke of Harajuku. The song was subsequently released as a single from their new EP "404 Not Found". Tak. iijima photo exhibition『5 years with FEMM』 was held at Harajuku Design Festa Gallery EAST 201, between December 12, 2020, and December 10, 2020.

To further promote their upcoming FEMM 2.0. studio album, they released the singles "Sugar Rush" and "Private Dancer" along with accompanying music videos. In late 2021, the duo released the song "Tokyo Girls Anthem", and in early 2022 they released an album of the same name as that single, supported through the singles "Tokyo Girls Anthem" and "We Got Each Other". On January 21, 2022, they released their last full album "Tokyo Ex Machina".

FEMM held FEMM-Isation UK/EU tour 2022 between July 14, 2022, and July 22, 2022, with shows in Düsseldorf, Paris, Manchester, Huddersfield and London.

=== 2022-2023: THE SIX, CHERRY and disbandment ===
On August 17, 2022, they released the digital EP "THE SIX", the song of same name was opening theme for MBS/TBS drama WHAT SIX SURVIVORS TOLD ….

On April 1, 2023, they communicated that RiRi and LuLa will return to their original belonging, in the distant future. What FEMM really stands for is "Far East "Military" Mannequin". These intelligent dolls were forced to perform proxy wars for humans in their era. RiRi and LuLa were transferred to the present age to change this scenario. When they arrived, their shape (body) of a doll was not accompanied. Only their "memories" reached two human girls across time and space. It was a movement to prevent new discrimination and conflicts. To achieve this, the method chosen by the four was "Music", which transcends borders and eras.

Their last single "CHERRY on TOP" was theme song for TV Asahi Freestyle Nippon Toitsu. Their last digital EP "CHERRY", which includes this single and solo songs to RiRi and LuLa, was released on November 15, 2023.

FEMM last concert "Last FEMM-Isation" was December 16, 2023 in London, and their final performance in Japan was a collaboration holiday party with fancyHIM on December 24, 2023.

== Members ==
- RiRi: "Combat" mannequin, portrayed by Emily Kaiho, who also portrays her agent managing Honey-B.
- LuLa: "Babyfaced housekeeper" mannequin, portrayed by Todo Hiro, who also portrays her agent managing W-Trouble.

== Artistry ==
=== Musical style and themes ===
"Kill the DJ" (2014)
A 30-seconds sample of "Kill the DJ". An electronic dance music song, it also contains elements of house in its compositions.

"Fxxk Boyz Get Money" (2014)
A 30-seconds sample of "Fxxk Boyz Get Money". FEMM's most well-known single, it contains elements of trap music and hip-hop.

FEMM's music has been described by several music critics and scholars as electronic dance music (EDM), with a variety of sub-elements including hip-hop, electronica, eurodance, and house music. According to Mike Kanert from Metropolis Magazine, he felt FEMM's music moved towards Americanized music, including hip-hop and club culture. A staff member from Arcadey.net commented that "FEMM's music mostly consists of regurgitated American EDM, dance-pop, and hip-hop, all of which is just as enjoyable as it is generic. I'm guessing it's supposed to be some kind of meta commentary on mainstream music and manufactured pop stars or something...".

FEMM's debut studio album Femm-Isation shows several elements of electronic dance music; Greg Hignight from J-Generation.com reviewed the album and noted they album's ability to use J-Pop music and English language to convey messages to the Western audience; "Each song is its own little pop universe. The album's English lyrics also allow for an instant emotional connection with listeners, circumventing the language barrier that's often been a challenge for J-Pop." For FEMM's 2014 pop ballad "Unbreakable", the entire production relied on live orchestral instruments and was considered a "versatile" move by both fans and critics; According to W-Trouble, the song "relies on human feelings rather than of a mannequin." W-Trouble later commented "Unbreakable' is probably the song that expresses [human] feelings the most. The other songs are pretty rigid so I think they're closer to the image of mannequins."

The song writing to FEMM's music material explore themes of girl power, feminism, and freedom of speech; "Fxxk Boyz Get Money" and "Girls Night Out", contain lyrics discussing female empowerment and not relying on male labor or assistance. Honey-B commented to an interviewer at Arama! Japan by stating, "We leave it to the listeners to decide about the message or feel of this track, but as for FEMM, they're singing about "girl power". It's okay to be sexy, just don't let them take advantage of you. "Fxxk Boyz Get Money" has very aggressive lyrics, but lots of women seem to relate to it. They call it their life anthem." For their first extended play Astroboy, both agents did not yet have any professional experience in singing. Honey-B and W-Trouble stated that the first time recording and appearing in a music video was challenging as they are not usually the ones in front of the camera. FEMM expressed that they would be honored to collaborate with any producers and songwriters who understand their message. Molly Osberg from Vice noted that FEMM combined Japanese fashion and music together. She commented "At least, that's how I imagine we get acts like FEMM, the mesmerizing J-pop electro duo with a backstory more inventive than anything on the SyFy channel right now." Osberg praised the producers and songwriters for being hidden pioneers in order to popularize the group, as she felt producers now were more "the frontmen". Corynn Smith from MTV Iggy was impressed by their English language skills and commented "The pair's overwhelmingly English discography has something for everyone with electronic taste, whether you're feeling like a romantic trance trip a la "We Flood the Night", craving a techno remix of '70s J-pop hit "UFO", or in a twerk-tastic, rubber-maid-outfit-clad "Fxxk Boyz Get Money" kinda mood."

=== Image ===
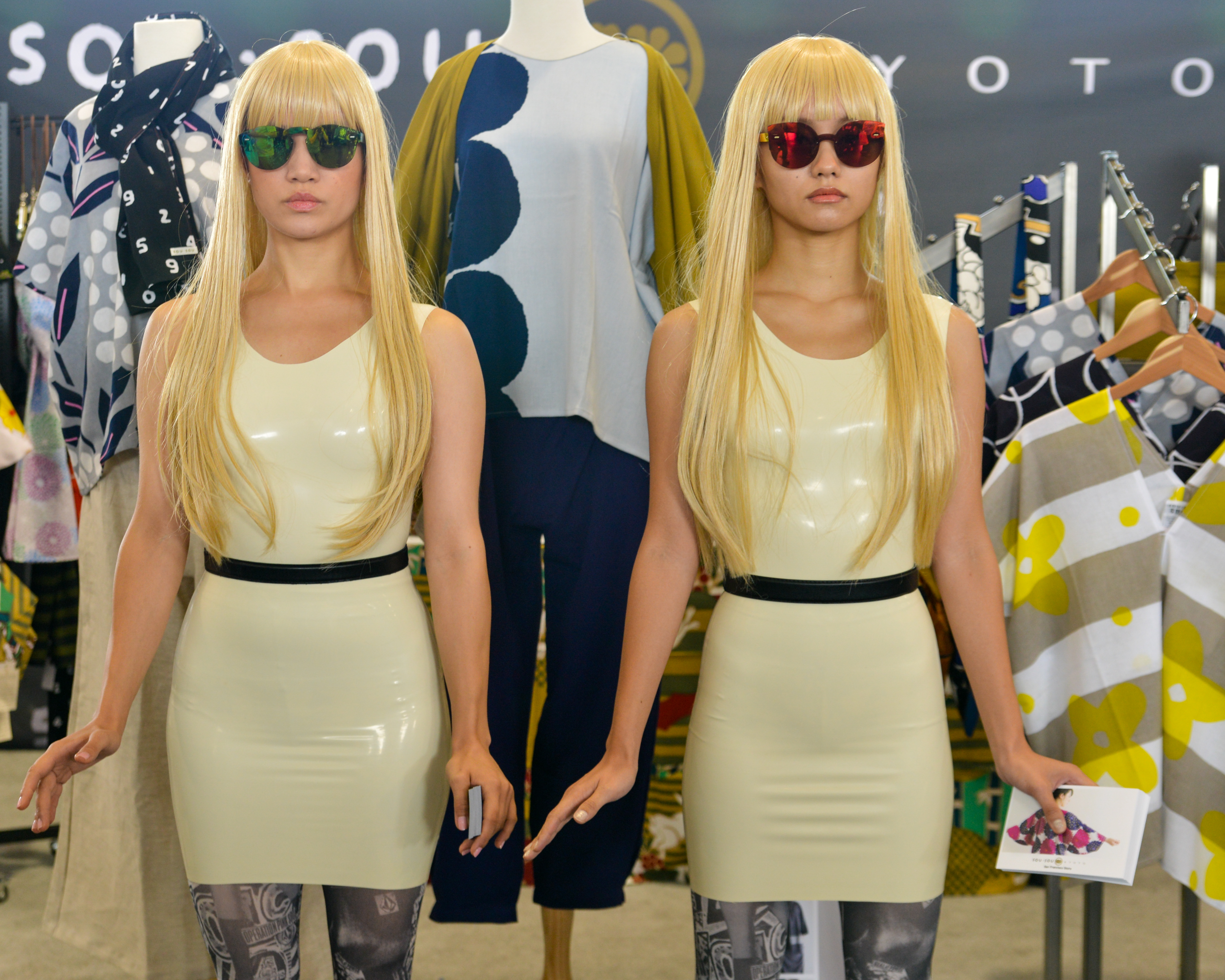
FEMM portray themselves as two plastic dolls, known as mannequins (pictured at the J-Pop Summit in 2015).

There are two roles that play out through the FEMM project; the mannequins and the agents. According to Honey-B, RiRi is a "combat" mannequin that wears "rather aggressive designs". According to W-Trouble, LuLa is described as a "babyfaced... housekeeper" that wears more "reserved" and "softer" designs of clothing. In a "fictional" description of the mannequins, Honey-B stated: "RiRi uses her combat skills to fight the anti-mannequins. She is really aggressive and takes on any challenge. She feels most comfortable in her military gear. LuLa's responsibility is to heal wounded mannequins, including RiRi. They depend on one another." Honey-B and W-Trouble are the "voices" of RiRi and LuLa, as the mannequins are portrayed with the inability to talk or vocally communicate. Honey-B stated, "For the musical nuances, it's listening that's important: the key is to match the sound and flow. If the nuance reveals a kind of attitude, it's partly due to the songwriting and partly due to [Honey-B]. According to FEMM, their tagline "Do Dolls Have Feelings? Do Their Songs Move People?" represents their virtual goal is to free all mannequins from human oppression.

FEMM's fan base are also recognized as agents and although they are categorized by their attributes, such as: military, pilot, medical, maid, spies, RiRi and LuLa are exclusive-attribute and exclusive-rank FEMM without any of the attributes and that is indicated in their serial numbers 000000. While performing and in public areas, FEMM stay in character and move with robot-like actions; they are sometimes carried on and off stage by staff members to underline mannequin characteristics. FEMM's live performances and music videos are choreographed by Japanese choreographing team Hidali, whilst many of the latex outfits are made by Shoichiro Matsuoka of GM Atelier.

=== Recognition ===
Several critics have commended the group for their diverse imagery and fashion style. Music critics from Singles Jukebox noted that FEMM were more widely noticed by Western audiences than the audience from Japan or J-pop culture. Kimi Li from What's a Greek blog compared the Japanese music towards Western culture, and stated "Japan's music industry has been seen to largely play catch up with the rest of the world. Major labels are slow to embrace streaming services. Japan's iTunes store is a wealth of anison, electro and pop but only a small fraction of that is available globally." Li found that although Korean pop music "catapulted" into Western culture, Li stated that FEMM were one of very few Japanese acts to emphasize an Americanized appeal. Marquis magazine focused on the duo's fetish attire, saying their "elaborate outfits and videos conquered the (fetish) dance floors in no time."

The group have found success through Western publications and have been listed in their top acts list; In October 2014, MTV Iggy listed FEMM as their "Artist to Watch" from a public vote. Colin McQuistan from The Huffington Post listed FEMM as one of their top six acts of 2016; McQuistan stated "I'm talking about FEMM, a deceptively slick production from Japan featuring two very real humans Honey-B and W-Trouble (sigh) who claim to 'stand up for the rights of mannequins worldwide' (double sigh). But who cares what their shtick is; the music is super commercial, catchy and very cleverly written pop."

== Activism ==
In 2015, FEMM uploaded videos to their YouTube channel performing "Fxxk Boyz Get Money" and "Anaconda" by Nicki Minaj in a Tokyo bath house. The short videos were created in support of the "Dance is Not a Crime" campaign which protested Japan's legislation in which night clubs would be closed at midnight and post "no dancing" signs at several clubs and areas. The Businesses Affecting Public Morals Regulation Act, which was introduced in 1948, prohibited people to dance within 66 metres from night clubs after a certain cut-off time. Despite public retaliation, law and police department enforcements increased by 2011. FEMM protested the law throughout 2015, using hashtags on social media websites and through music videos. The video was advertised by Japanese record label Dimension Point and included "Fxxk Boyz Get Money" on their compilation album.

== Tours ==
- Promo Tour (2014-2015)

Date (2014)	City	Country	Venue
July 11	Tulsa	United States	Cox Business Center (Tokyo in Tulsa)
September 5	Tokyo	Japan	Eva Simons' Sound Check Tour (1 Night)
September 6	Tokyo	Japan	Hatsudai Tamai Hospital (FEMM-isation Vol.3)
September 27	Tokyo	Japan	Odaiba ULTRA PARK (ULTRA JAPAN)
October 10	Tokyo	Japan	Shinkiba ageHa (Yelloween 2014)
October 29	Tokyo	Japan	TWO ROOMS (Disaronno Wears Versace)
October 30	Tokyo	Japan	Ele Tokyo (FUTUROPOLIS "Metropolis' Halloween Glitterball")
November 28	Tokyo	Japan	南青山 Le Baron de Paris (Le Baron de Paris 8th Anniversary Party)
Date (2015)	City	Country	Venue
February 3	Tokyo	Japan	TWO ROOMS (Disaronno Terrace Tokyo)
February 14	Tokyo	Japan	南青山 Le Baron de Paris (FALINE TOKYO 11th Anniversary Party)
February 28	Tokyo	Japan	AiSOTOPE LOUNGE (fancyHIM)
May 22	Tokyo	Japan	SOLOMONS (Neko Night)
June 12	Tokyo	Japan	Museum of Contemporary Art Tokyo (Nippon Genki Project 2015)
June 13	Tokyo	Japan	Sound Museum Vision (Tokyo Pop x Dholic Shibuya 109 Opening After Party)
July 3	Tokyo	Japan	Club Camelot (SKY BEACH)
August 7	Los Angeles	United States	RAGE Restaurant & Bar (GAMeBoi)
August 8	San Francisco	United States	Fort Mason Center (J-Pop Summit)
August 22	Osaka	Japan	Osaka Expo Memorial Park (Bubble Festival Osaka 2015)
September 19	Tokyo	Japan	Laforet Harajuku (Vogue's Fashion Night Out)
September 19	Tokyo	Japan	WOMB (Rocks*)
September 30	Tokyo	Japan	Roppongi Hills (Fashion Connect 2015)
October 9	Tokyo	Japan	WWW (BRDG 06 Crazy House)
October 16	Tokyo	Japan	Camelot (Halloween Night Shibuya109 x T-Spook)
October 24	Tokyo	Japan	Sound Museum Vision (Nylon Pink Halloween)
October 30	Tokyo	Japan	DIANA (Halloween Costume Contest 2015)
October 30	Tokyo	Japan	Sound Museum Vision (Wonder&Clocks' Big Halloween Party)
October 31	Tokyo	Japan	AiSOTOPE LOUNGE (Trick or Treatment)
October 31	Tokyo	Japan	ORANGE AREA 渋谷 VUENOS (Shibu Festival)
November 8	Tokyo	Japan	Yoyogi Gymnasium Tokyo (Moshi Moshi Nippon Festival 2015)
November 11	Tokyo	Japan	Ex Theater Roppongi (YouTube FanFest)

- FEMM-isation UK/EU Tour (2022)

Date (2022)	City	Country	Venue
July 14	Düsseldorf	Germany	The Tube
July 16	Paris	France	Badaboum
July 19	Manchester	England	Night & Day Cafe
July 20	Huddersfield	England	The Parish
July 21	London	England	Boston Music Room
July 22	London	England	HYPER JAPAN
September 24	Madrid	Spain	IFEMA
September 25	Madrid	Spain	IFEMA

- Last FEMM-isation Tour (2023)

Date (2023)	City	Country	Venue
May 20	Kraków	Poland	Expo Krakow (Magnificon Expo 2023)
May 21	Kraków	Poland	Expo Krakow (Magnificon Expo 2023)
July 22	London	England	Olympia London (HYPER JAPAN)
July 28	Munich	Germany	Kranhalle (Geek Festival)
October 27	Atlanta	United States	Renaissance Waverly and Cobb Galleria (Anime Weekend Atlanta 2023)
October 29	Atlanta	United States	Renaissance Waverly and Cobb Galleria (Anime Weekend Atlanta 2023)
November 30	Jeddah	Saudi Arabia	Jeddah Convention Center (Comic Con Arabia 2023)
December 16	London	England	The Lower Third
December 24	Tokyo	Japan	fancyHIM

== Discography ==
Studio albums

- Femm-Isation (2014)
- 80's/90's J-Pop Revival (2017)
- Tokyo Girls Anthem (2021)
- Tokyo Ex Machina (2022)

Extended plays

- Astroboy (2014)
- Pow!/L.C.S. (2016)
- Dollhouse (2018)
- 404 Not Found (2020)
- The Six (2022)
- Cherry (2023)
