= Anzai =

Anzai (written: 安西, 安斎 or 安済) is a Japanese surname. Notable people with the surname include:

- Atsuko Anzai (安西 篤子; born 1927), Japanese novelist
- Chika Anzai (安済 知佳; born 1990), Japanese voice actress
- Earl I. Anzai (1941–2023), American lawyer and politician
- Emma Anzai, Australian musician and band member of Sick Puppies and Evanescence
- Hiroko Anzai (安西 ひろこ; born 1979), Japanese actress, model and gravure idol
- Fuyue Anzai (安西 冬衛; 1898–1965), Japanese poet
- Jiro Anzai (安西二郎; born 1930), Japanese author
- Kalen Anzai (安斉かれん; born 1999), Japanese singer and actress
- Koki Anzai (安西幸輝; born 1995), Japanese footballer
- Maria Anzai (安西 マリア; 1953–2014), Japanese idol
- Masahiro Anzai (安西正弘; 1954-2021), Japanese actor and voice actor
- Nobuaki Anzai (安斎 伸彰; born 1985), Japanese Go player
- Nobuyuki Anzai (安西 信行; born 1972), Japanese manga artist
- Seira Anzai (安斉 星来; born 2004), model and actress
- Shigeo Anzai (安斎 重男; 1939–2020), Japanese photographer
- Shinsho Anzai (安西信昌; born 1985), Japanese martial artist and wrestler
- Tatsuya Anzai (安在 達弥; born 1996), Japanese footballer
- Yukari Anzai (安齋 由香里; born 1995), Japanese-Taiwanese voice actress
- Yuma Anzai (安齊勇馬; born 1999), Japanese wrestler

== Fictional characters ==
- Kokoro Anzai, the main protagonist of Lonely Castle in the Mirror
- Masaki Anzai, a supporting character in Wind Breaker
- Mitsuyoshi Anzai, a supporting character in Slam Dunk
- Yūki Anzai, the main protagonist of Devils' Line
