= Boys Esté =

Japanese manga series

- Cover of Boys Esté volume 1 as publisher by Kodansha

BOYSエステ (BOYS Esute)
- Manga
- Written by: Souko Masaki
- Published by: Kodansha
- English publisher: SG: Chuang Yi
- Magazine: Dessert
- Original run: 2004 – 2007
- Volumes: 7
- Television drama
- Studio: AVEC
- Original network: TV Tokyo
- Original run: July 12, 2007 – September 28, 2007
- Episodes: 12

Boys Esté (Japanese: BOYSエステ, Hepburn: BOYS Esute) is a manga series by Souko Masaki (真崎総子, Masaki Sōko). The series is published in Japan by Kodansha and by Chuang Yi in English in Singapore. A live-action drama airs on TV Tokyo.

The story stars Shizuka Koiwai (小岩井 静香, Koiwai Shizuka), an overweight girl who was rejected by her ex-boyfriend because of her weight. She enrolls in a beauty program where she hopes of obtaining a perfect figure.

== Cast ==
The drama cast is:

- Yumi Sugimoto - Shizuka Koiwai (小岩井 静香, Koiwai Shizuka)
- Aoi Nakamura - Hibiki Akagi (赤城響, Akagi Hibiki)
- Takumi Saito - Shichiri Shikishima (敷島 七里, Shikishima Shichiri)
- Hiroyuki Ikeuchi - Kanau Morinaga (森永 叶, Morinaga Kanau)
- Kazuhiro Ozawa - Naoki Ebisu (恵比寿 直紀, Ebisu Naoki)
- Toshiki Kashu - Kitsuma Meitō (名糖 吉馬, Meitō Kitsuma)
- Manami Hashimoto - Akagi Suzuka (赤城鈴香, Suzuka Akagi)
