= Neko no Otera no Chion-san =

Japanese manga series

- First tankōbon volume cover

猫のお寺の知恩さん
- Genre: Romantic comedy
- Manga
- Written by: Makoto Ojiro
- Published by: Shogakukan
- Magazine: Weekly Big Comic Spirits
- Original run: May 9, 2016 – October 6, 2018
- Volumes: 9
- icon

Neko no Otera no Chion-san (猫のお寺の知恩さん; "Cat Temple's Miss Chion") is a Japanese manga series written and illustrated by Makoto Ojiro. It was serialized in Shogakukan's seinen manga magazine Weekly Big Comic Spirits from May 2016 to October 2018, with its chapters collected in nine tankōbon volumes.

== Plot ==
The series follows Gen, a high school student who relocates to a quiet countryside town to attend school. He stays at a relative's temple, where he begins living alongside Chion. Despite her seemingly dependable nature, Chion exhibits unguarded behavior. The story chronicles their daily interactions against the backdrop of a serene rural setting.

== Publication ==
Written and illustrated by Makoto Ojiro, Neko no Otera no Chion-san was serialized in Shogakukan's seinen manga magazine Weekly Big Comic Spirits from May 9, 2016, to October 6, 2018. Shogakukan collected its chapters in nine tankōbon volumes, released from August 30, 2016, to December 27, 2018.

=== Volumes ===
No.	Japanese release date	Japanese ISBN
1	August 30, 2016	978-4-09-187770-3
2	November 30, 2016	978-4-09-189237-9
3	February 28, 2017	978-4-09-189370-3
4	June 30, 2017	978-4-09-189509-7
5	October 30, 2017	978-4-09-189640-7
6	February 23, 2018	978-4-09-189798-5
7	May 30, 2018	978-4-09-860016-8
8	September 28, 2018	978-4-09-860077-9
9	December 27, 2018	978-4-09-860152-3

== Reception ==
Neko no Otera no Chion-san won the 2016 Bros Comic Awards by the Tokyo News Service's TV Bros. magazine.
