= Ryō Katō =

Japanese actor and tarento (born 1990)

- 加藤 諒
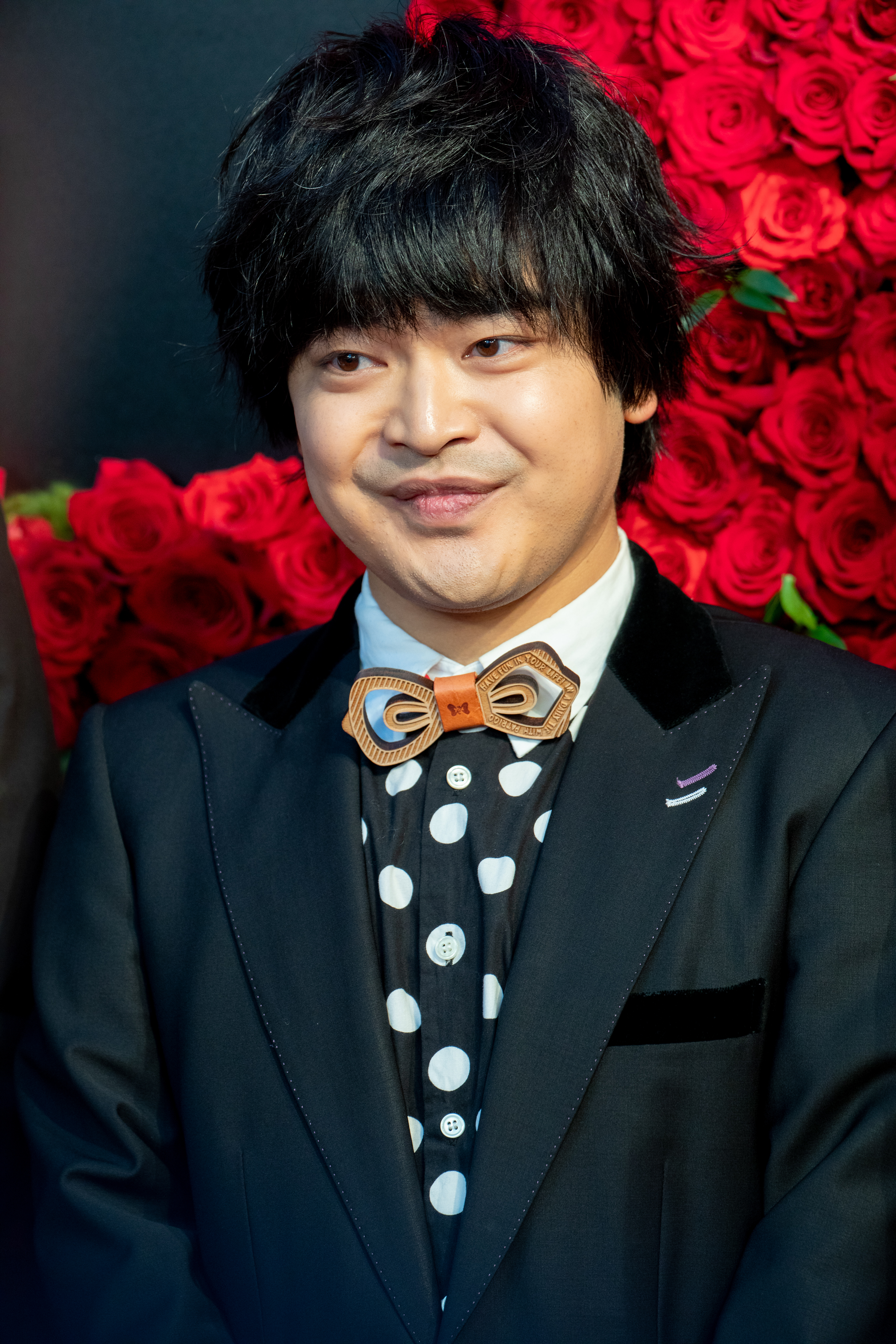
- Katō at Opening Ceremony of the Tokyo International Film Festival 2018.
- Born: 13 February 1990 (age 36); Shizuoka, Shizuoka, Japan
- Education: Tama Art University
- Occupation: Actor
- Years active: 2000–present
- Agent: Cube
- Style: Stage; television drama; film; advertisements
- Website: Official website

Ryō Katō (加藤 諒, Katō Ryō; born 13 February 1990 in Shizuoka, Shizuoka) is a Japanese actor and tarento. He graduated from the Department of Moving Images and Performing Arts in the Faculty of Art and Communication at Tama Art University. He is represented with Cube.

== Biography ==
In 2000, Katō debuted in the variety show Appare Sanma Dai Sensei at the age of ten.

Later on he played in the film Detroit Metal City and played supporting roles in dramas such as Gakkō no Kaidan, Omoni Naitemasu, and Kaitō Yamaneko.

== Filmography ==
=== Television ===
Year	Title	Role	Notes	Ref.
2016	Sanada Maru	Ishiai Jūzō	Taiga drama	
2019	Secret x Heroine Phantomirage!	Guest character		
2021	Nemesis	Yoichi Ryu		
2025	Masked Ninja Akakage	Shirokage		

=== Films ===
Year	Title	Role	Notes	Ref.
2016	Kin Medal Otoko	Seiji Miura		
2021	Pretenders			
2023	Nemesis: The Mystery of the Golden Spiral	Yoichi Ryu		
2023	Fly Me to the Saitama: From Biwa Lake with Love			
2024	Cells at Work!	Senior Red Blood Cell (AA5100)		
2025	Stigmatized Properties: Possession			
2026	Aoike Haruka no Jiken Channel			

=== Stage ===
Year	Title	Role	Notes	Ref.
2015	Live Spectacle Naruto 2015	Choji Akimichi		

=== Special programmes ===
Year	Title	Notes	Ref.
2015	Suki ni natta Hito 13 Kotoshi no Owari ni Kotoshi no Kao no Koi ga Hajimaru! SP		
2016	Doyō Premium: Yūmeijin ga Hajimete hanashimasu! Totte oki Ranking: Kokode shika Kikenai Himitsu no Hanashi 30 Renpatsu		
2016	Masahiro Nakai no Tsui Katsu tte Nannano!? –Boku wa Kōshite Shinitai– 2016		
