= Even If You Don't Do It =

Manga series by Haru Haruno

- First tankōbon volume cover

あなたがしてくれなくても (Anata ga Shite Kurenakutemo)
- Genre: Drama, romance
- Manga
- Written by: Haru Haruno
- Published by: Futabasha
- English publisher: NA: Coolmic
- Imprint: Action Comics
- Magazine: Manga Action
- Original run: June 20, 2017 – December 3, 2024
- Volumes: 15
- Television drama
- Directed by: Hiroshi Nishitani
- Written by: Takayuki Ichikawa; Satoko Okazaki; Sho Kuroda
- Music by: Yugo Kanno
- Studio: Fuji Television
- Original network: FNS (Fuji TV)
- Original run: April 13, 2023 – June 22, 2023
- Episodes: 10

Even If You Don't Do It (あなたがしてくれなくても, Anata ga Shite Kurenakutemo) is a Japanese manga series written and illustrated by Haru Haruno. It was serialized in Futabasha's Manga Action magazine from June 2017 to December 2024. A live-action television drama adaptation aired from April to June 2023.

== Plot ==
Michi Yoshino, a 32-year-old woman, has been in a sexless marriage with her husband Yoichi for two years despite otherwise maintaining a normal relationship. After a failed attempt to rekindle intimacy with her husband, Michi confides in her coworker Makoto Niina, who reveals that he is also in a sexless marriage. The two develop a close bond through their shared frustrations and begin to rely on each other emotionally as their respective marriages continue to deteriorate.

As Yoichi becomes distant and later commits an act of infidelity, he attempts to repair his relationship with Michi, but their emotional disconnect remains. Meanwhile, Makoto's marriage to his career-focused wife Kaede also grows increasingly strained, and he confesses his feelings to Michi, though the two hesitate to begin a physical relationship. Faced with the consequences of their actions and feelings, both Michi and Makoto decide to confront their spouses and reevaluate their marriages.

== Media ==
=== Manga ===
Written and illustrated by Haru Haruno, Even If You Don't Do It was serialized in Futabasha's Manga Action magazine from June 20, 2017, to December 3, 2024. Its chapters have been compiled into fourteen tankōbon volumes as of April 2025. A fifteenth volume, which serves as an after story, was released on May 14, 2026.

The manga is licensed in English by Coolmic.

==== Volume list ====
No.	Release date	ISBN
1	March 28, 2018	978-4-575-85132-8
2	July 27, 2018	978-4-575-85192-2
3	March 28, 2019	978-4-575-85287-5
4	November 28, 2019	978-4-575-85383-4
5	April 27, 2020	978-4-575-85437-4
6	December 26, 2020	978-4-575-85529-6
7	August 26, 2021	978-4-575-85626-2
8	April 27, 2022	978-4-575-85711-5
9	October 27, 2022	978-4-575-85772-6
10	March 16, 2023	978-4-575-85823-5
11	June 28, 2023	978-4-575-85857-0
12	November 28, 2023	978-4-575-85913-3
13	June 27, 2024	978-4-575-85983-6
14	April 24, 2025	978-4-575-86085-6
15	May 14, 2026	978-4-575-86217-1

=== Drama ===
A live-action television drama adaptation was announced on February 16, 2023. The series starred Nao, Takanori Iwata, Minami Tanaka, and Eita Nagayama in lead roles. The series was directed by Hiroshi Nishitani, with screenplays by Takayuki Ichikawa, Satoko Okazaki, and Sho Kuroda, and music composed by Yugo Kanno. It aired on Fuji TV and its affiliates from April 13, to June 22, 2023.

== Reception ==
By June 2023, the manga had over 9.4 million copies in circulation. By November 2023, the manga had over 10 million copies in circulation.
