= Nemesis: The Mystery of the Golden Spiral =

- DVD cover
- Directed by: Yu Irie
- Written by: Takehiko Hata
- Produced by: Naoaki Kitajima; Hideki Hoshino
- Starring: Suzu Hirose; Sho Sakurai; Ryo Katsuji; Aoi Nakamura; Miu Tomita; Yuko Oshima; Tatsuya Ueda; Daiken Okudaira; Ryō Katō; Yoko Minamino; Kanna Hashimoto; Yōko Maki; Kōichi Satō; Yōsuke Eguchi
- Cinematography: Kenji Tominaga
- Edited by: Takashi Sato
- Music by: Masaru Yokoyama
- Production company: Twins Japan
- Distributed by: Warner Bros.
- Release date: 31 March 2023 (Japan)
- Running time: 99 minutes
- Country: Japan
- Language: Japanese

Nemesis: The Mystery of the Golden Spiral (Japanese: 映画ネメシス 黄金螺旋の謎) is a 2023 Japanese mystery film directed by Yu Irie, starring Suzu Hirose, Sho Sakurai, Ryo Katsuji, Aoi Nakamura, Miu Tomita, Yuko Oshima, Tatsuya Ueda, Daiken Okudaira, Ryō Katō, Yoko Minamino, Kanna Hashimoto, Yōko Maki, Kōichi Satō and Yōsuke Eguchi. It is a spinoff of the television drama Nemesis set two years after the events of the series.

== Cast ==
- Suzu Hirose as Anna Mikami
- Sho Sakurai as Naoki Kazama
- Ryo Katsuji as Takahiro Chikuma
- Aoi Nakamura as Yuji Shimanto
- Miu Tomita as Kaoru Koyamakawa
- Yuko Oshima as Kiiko Uehara
- Tatsuya Ueda as Kensho Hoshi
- Daiken Okudaira as Joi Himekawa
- Ryō Katō as Yoichi Ryo
- Yoko Minamino as Akira Himura
- Kanna Hashimoto Tomomi Yotsuba
- Yōko Maki as Mizuho Kanda
- Kōichi Satō as Mado
- Yōsuke Eguchi as Kazuaki Kurita
- Ayona Mishima as Rinrin
- Masato as Zippo man
- Eishin as Trolley man
- Takashi Sasano as Enokido Rikimaru
- Rion Takahashi as Communications Officer
- Tateto Serizawa as Man
- Yota Kawase as Senior
- Saori Izawa as Assassin
- Kazuya Tanabe as Manager
- Hiroaki Oka as Shinya
- Kiita Komagine as Ryota
- Eiki Narita
- Kyosuke Ichijo as Jiro
- Kenta Yamagishi
- Takayuki Kita
- Mizuki Sashide as Chihiro
- Ryoka Neya
- Keiichiro Azuma as Keita
- Koyo Mastumura as Mitsuo
- Takuro Kodama as Burglar
- Mutsuo Yoshioka as Police Officer
- Daimu Hori as Police Officer
- Satsuki Nakagami as Real Estate Agent
- Ariei Umefune

== Production ==
Naoaki Kitajima, who produced the mystery drama series Nemesis, claimed to have "always hoped" that the series, which aired in April 2021, would receive a film adaptation. As he received "many" fan requests for a spinoff and all of the cast were willing to participate in projects related to the series, he began working on a film adaptation. Yu Irie, who directed the series, was set to direct, while Suzu Hirose, Sho Sakurai, Ryo Katsuji and Yōsuke Eguchi were to reprise their roles from the series. In producing the film, Kitajima aimed to create visuals which they were previously unable to achieve for a television series. The script was written by screenwriter and novelist Takehiko Hata, who aimed to challenge the viewer. Principal photography took place in late June 2022. The film was shot in the Kanagawa Prefecture. Two large-scale shoots took place in a sealed-off area.

It was publicly announced in September 2022 that Nemesis was to receive a live-action film spinoff titled Nemesis: The Mystery of the Golden Spiral, starring Hirose, Sakurai, Katsuji and Eguchi. The following month, it was announced that Aoi Nakamura, Miu Tomita, Yuko Oshima, Tatsuya Ueda, Daiken Okudaira, Ryō Katō, Ayona Mishima, Yoko Minamino and Yōko Maki would also be reprising their roles from the series. In January 2023, it was announced that Kanna Hashimoto would be reprising her role. It was revealed at the end of that month that the film would also star Masato, Eishin, Takashi Sasano, Hiroaki Oka and Kiita Komagine.

== Release ==
Ahead of the film's release, a New Year's special featuring Hirose and Sakure was broadcast on Nippon Television among various other channels from 1 to 3 January 2023. The film premiered at a ceremony in Tokyo on 6 March before opening in theatres nationwide on 31 March. The film debuted in third place at the Japanese box office. It dropped to sixth place in its second week and again to tenth place in its third. The film was released to Blu-ray and DVD on 6 September. A deluxe Blu-ray edition was also released.

== Reception ==
Shinichiro Amamoto of Kinema Junpo praised the plot and the diversity of the cast, and noted that the story is "complex", such that he made "new discoveries" regarding the film's details on each rewatch. Amamoto considered the film's Blu-ray and DVD release a "welcome development" and called the deluxe Blu-ray edition a "must-have" for fans. Kentaro Muramutsu of Cinema Today rated the film 3 stars out of 5 and praised the cast. Film critic Kiichiro Yanashita opined that the film was "difficult" and "too hard to understand", though he noted that he had not seen the original television drama. However, he also felt that the actions of the film's antagonist were not well justified and that he lacked a proper motive for his crimes.
