= Mitsuko Delivers =

Hara ga Kore Nande
- Directed by: Yuya Ishii
- Screenplay by: Yuya Ishii
- Starring: Riisa Naka; Aoi Nakamura
- Release date: November 5, 2011 (Japan)
- Running time: 109 minutes
- Country: Japan
- Language: Japanese

Mitsuko Delivers (ハラがコレなんで, Hara ga Kore Nande) is a 2011 Japanese comedy film directed by Yuya Ishii.

== Cast ==
- Riisa Naka as Mitsuko
- Aoi Nakamura
- Shigeyuki Totsugi

== Reception ==
On Rotten Tomatoes, the film has an aggregate score of 43% based on 3 positive and 4 negative critic reviews.
