= Homecomings (band) =

Japanese band

- Also known as: Homukami
- Origin: Kyoto
- Years active: 2012–present
- Labels: Second Royal; Kakubarizm; IRORI
- Members: Yuki Fukutomi; Ayaka Tatamino; Honami Fukuda
- Past members: Narumi Ishida (2012–2024)
- Website: homecomings.jp

Homecomings (Japanese: ホームカミングス, Hepburn: Hōmukamingusu), often shortened to Homukami (ホムカミ), is a Japanese band from Kyoto formed in 2012. They released their debut album in 2014, entitled Somehow, Somewhere. As of July 2026, they released six albums.

== Band members ==
- Yuki Fukutomi – guitar
- Ayaka Tatamino – vocals and guitarist
- Honami Fukuda – bass guitar

=== Former member ===
- Narumi Ishida – drums (graduated in 2024)

== History ==
The band formed in 2012 while the band members were attending Kyoto Seika University. They released their debut album in 2014 entitled Somehow, Somewhere, which they recorded in Magi Sound Studio, a newly built recording studio at Kyoto Seika University. They debuted under contract with the music label Second Royal Records and Kakubarizm.

In May 2016, they released their second album, entitled Sale of Broken Dreams. In 2018, they performed the theme song for the anime film Liz and the Blue Bird entitled "Songbirds". later that year they released their third album Whale Living.

In 2019, they performed "Cakes", the theme song for the film Ai ga Nanda. In 2020, they signed a new contract on Pony Canyon's label, IRORI Records.

In March 2021, they performed the closing theme song for the TV drama Soro Katsu Joshi no Susume entitled "Herge", they also performed the ending theme of the second season entitled "i care". In May of that year, they release their fourth album entitled Moving Days. In December, they performed the theme song of the TV drama Shitsuren Meshi, entitled "Arpeggio".

In 2023, they performed the closing theme for the anime, Insomniacs After School, entitled "Lapse", which was included in their fifth album release in April 2023, entitled New Neighbors. In 2024, they perform the theme song of the film Mikazuki to Neko entitled "Moon Shaped". In February 2024, the band announced that the Narumi Ishida, the band's drummer, will leave the band.

== Discography ==
=== Albums ===
| Year | Title | Ref |
|---|---|---|
| 2014 | Somehow, Somewhere | |
| 2016 | Sale of Broken Dreams | |
| 2018 | Whale Living | |
| 2021 | Moving Days | |
| 2023 | New Neighbors | |
| 2024 | See You, Frail Angel. Sea Adore You | |

=== Singles ===
| Year | Title | Ref |
|---|---|---|
| 2014 | Shiroi Hikari no Asa ni (白い光の朝に) | (Note: Collaboration with Sachie Hiraga) |
| 2015 | Hurts | |
| 2019 | Cake | |
| 2023 | Hikari no niwa to Sakana no Yume (光の庭と魚の夢) | |

== Nomination ==
Homecomings' WHALE LIVING was nominated for the 11th CD Shop Awards in 2019.
