= Aoi Nakamura =

Japanese photomodel and actor (born 1991)

Aoi Nakamura 中村 蒼
- Born: Aoi Nakamura 中村 蒼 4 March 1991 (age 35); Fukuoka, Japan
- Occupations: Actor; model
- Years active: 2005—present
- Website: Aoi Nakamura Official Website

Aoi Nakamura (中村 蒼, Nakamura Aoi; born 4 March 1991) is a Japanese model and actor. He belongs to the talent agency LesPros Entertainment.

== History ==
Nakamura Aoi entered the entertainment industry when he won the Grand Prix at the final round of the 18th Junon Superboy Contest held in November 2005. He was in the third year at junior high school and only 14 at the time, making him the first ever junior high school student Grand Prix winner.

Nakamura's father was responsible for sending in the application to the contest. Since Nakamura was a child he was called cute by those around him and his father wondered if it was really true, leading to the application. Nakamura himself was initially unenthusiastic about the contest as he disliked having to leave Fukuoka for Tokyo, and felt more apprehension than happiness when he won.

In October 2006, he made his debut as an actor in the stage play "Den-en ni Shisu", playing the lead role. At the end of March 2007, in order to start his entertainment activities seriously, he left his hometown of Fukuoka alone and moved to Tokyo. In July, he received his first lead role in a drama serial, "Boys Este". He also made his first movie appearance in the film "Koizora" which started showing in theatres November the same year.

Nakamura's first lead role in a movie "Hyakuhachi" showed in theatres in August 2008. In 2010, he was in movies one after another, including "Beck" and "Ooku". He also starred in "Paranormal Activity 2: Tokyo Night" that premiered in November 2010 and was released in more than 30 countries.

In 2011, from May to June, he played the leading role in stage play "Curry Life". In July, he played a semi-leading role in "Hanazakari no Kimitachi e 2011", a remake of popular drama serial.

== Filmography ==
=== Movies ===
- Hyakuhachi (2008), Nobuhiro "Nobu" Kobayashi
- Beck (2010), Yuji "Saku" Sakurai
- Perfect Blue (2010), Shinya Moro'oka
- Ooku (2010), Kakizoe
- Paranormal Activity 2: Tokyo Night (2010), Koichi Yamano
- Sabi♂Sabi♀: Quirky Guys and Gals (2011), Konosuke Muratsubaki
- Hoshi no Furumachi (2011), Kotaro Tsutsumi
- Kimi to Boku (2011), young man
- My Back Page (2011), Hiroshi Shibayama
- Ike! Genshi Koukouen Gekibu (2011), Genki Ogasawara
- Hara ga Kore Nande (2011), Yōichi Kodama
- Beyond the Memories (2013), Toshikuni Mayama
- Tokyo Nanmin (2014), Osamu Tokieda
- Library Wars: The Last Mission (2015)
- Recall (2018), Hajime Sugimoto
- Momi's House (2020)
- Nemesis: The Mystery of the Golden Spiral (2023), Yūji Shimanto
- The Silent Service (2023), Eiji Yamanaka
- Aimitagai (2024), Sumito
- Muromachi Outsiders (2025), Ashikaga Yoshimasa
- As for Me (2025), Yoichi Yoshizawa
- The Silent Service: The Battle of the Arctic Ocean (2025), Eiji Yamanaka
- Brand New Landscape (2025)
- Hero's Island (2025), Komatsu
- Kyojo: Reunion (2026)
- Kyojo: Requiem (2026)
- Kingdom 5: The Clash of Souls (2026), Qing She
- The Secret Battlefield (2026), Gen'ichi Takashiro

=== TV dramas ===
- Shinigami no Ballad episode 5 (2007), Daiki Ikuma
- Boys Este (2007), Hibiki Akagi
- The Yasumi Jikan (2008-2009), Akira
- Gakko ja Oshierarenai! (2008), Kazuki Mizuki
- Q.E.D. Shomei Shuryo (2009), So Toma
- Tsutaetai! Bokura no Yume Chōdōken ga Oshiete Kureta Chikara ~Asunaro Gakkō no Monogatari~ (2009), Akira Takahara
- Otokomae! 2 episode 12 (2009), Hisanao Hasegawa
- Angel Bank ~Tenshoku Dairinin (2010), Natsuki Emura
- Perfect Blue (2010), Shinya Moro'oka
- Sekai no Owari ni Saku Hana (2010), Taiyo Yano
- Propose Kyodai ~Umare Jun Betsu Otoko ga Kekkon Suru Hōhō~ episode 3 (2011), Saburo Yamada
- Saisei Kyoryu (2011), Hideki Hōrai
- Marumo no Okite last episode (2011), Izumi Sano (special appearance)
- Hanakazari no Kimitachi e 2011 (2011), Izumi Sano
- Majutsu wa Sasayaku (2011), Mamoru Takagi
- Blackboard ~Jidai to Tatakatta Kyōshitachi~ episode 1 (2012), Takefumi Baba
- Legal High episode 1 (2012), Yūichi Tsubokura
- L et M Watashi ga Anata wo Aisuru Riyu, Sono Hoka no Monogatari (2012), Kei Kurata
- Iki mo Dekinai Natsu (2012), Kota Kusano
- Monsters last episode (2012), Junpei Sekine
- Akujotachi no Mesu Episode 2 (2012), Seiichi Ishizuka
- Byakkotai ~Yaburezarushatachi (2013), Gisaburo Shinoda
- Tank Top Fighter (2013), Sora Kureda
- Yae no Sakura (2013), Tokutomi Sohō
- Zainin no Uso (2014), Hirose
- The Thorns of Alice (2014), Yuma Bandai
- Kabuki-Mono Keiji (2015), Shinkuro
- Mutsu: Mieru Me (2015), Ibara
- Otto no Chinpo ga Hairanai (2019), Kenichi
- Yell (2020), Tetsuo Murano
- Nemesis (2021), Yūji Shimanto
- Kamen Rider Black Sun (2022), young Kotaro Minami
- Ranman (2023), Yūichirō Hirose
- Ōoku: The Inner Chambers (2023), Ienari Tokugawa
- The Silent Service (2024), Eiji Yamanaka
- Oshi no Ko (2024), Sumiaki Raida
- Unbound (2025), Jirobei
- Simulation: Defeat in the Summer of 1941 (2025), Gen'ichi Takashiro
- Song of the Samurai (2026), Yamanami Keisuke

=== Stage plays ===
- Den-en ni Shisu (2006), youth Terayama
- Curry Life (2011), Kensuke
- Curry Life (Recitation) (2011), Kensuke
- Atami Satsujin Jiken Next: Kuwae Tabako Denbee Sōsa Nisshi (2012), Kintaro Oyama
- Tsuku, Kieru (2013), young person working in hotel
- Sanada Jūyūshi (2014), Daisuke Sanada

=== Commercials ===
- Asahi Breweries Cocktail Partner (2012)

=== Music videos ===
- 2Backka - Harebare (2009)
- Lecca - Clown Love (Short Movie) (2012)
