= Minami Tanaka (announcer) =

Japanese announcer (born 1986)

- 田中 みな実
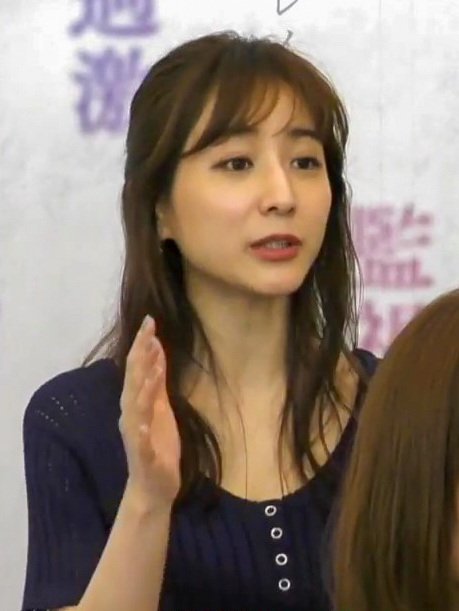
- Tanaka in 2019
- Born: Minami Amy Tanaka (田中エイミーみな実, Tanaka Eimī Minami); 23 November 1986 (age 39); New York, U.S.
- Other names: Minamin (みなみん); Amy; Minachan (みなちゃん)
- Education: Aoyama Gakuin University
- Occupations: Short film actress (2004); Magazine model (2007); TBS announcer (2009–14; Freelance announcer (2014–)
- Years active: 2009–
- Agent: FLaMme
- Notable work: Current; Minami Tanaka Attaka Time; antenna*Tokyo Ongoing; Former; Job Tune R
- Style: Variety programmes
- Television: Current; Ariyoshi Japon; Job Tune: Ano Shokugyō no Himitsu butcha kemasu!; Hirukyun!; Are You Zurezure; Former; AnaCan; SataNepu Best Ten; Nippon! Ijiru Z; Joshi-ana no Batsu; Bakuhō! The Friday; Sunday Japon; News na Bansan-kai
- Spouse: Kazuya Kamenashi (m. 2026)
- Website: Official profile

Minami Tanaka (田中 みな実, Tanaka Minami; born 23 November 1986) is a Japanese freelance announcer and tarento who is a former Tokyo Broadcasting System Television announcer.

== Early life and education ==
Tanaka was born in New York City, U.S. on 23 November 1986. Because she was born in the U.S. she was given the middle name of Amy. She was moved to Japan soon after her birth, but after her first year in elementary school she lived in London and San Francisco before returning to Japan for junior high school.

She attended the Aoyama Gakuin University Department of English Literature. She also played tennis while at the university. It is said that she was interested in announcer 's work as Ayaka Ogawa, a senior who was longing for Madonna—like her existence of the circle, she announced to become an announcer. She also worked as a model for fashion magazines and posters. In 2007, she participated in the "Miss Aoyama Contest 2007" and became Semi-Miss.

== As a TBS announcer 2009 ==
After graduating in English Literature from Aoyama Gakuin University she joined TBS Television.

On 7 April, she joined synchronised with AnaCan and made her announcing debuts with Ai Eto. On 12 April, they introduced themselves with a nationwide broadcast at Akko no omakase!, introducing herself with Eto. From the beginning she wrote her blog in the AnaCan official website but closed due to the end of the programme. After that she started another blog (her current blog).

She debuted as a female customer of the film Professor Layton and the Eternal Diva released in the same year as a voice actress.

She made her first appearance on Sunday Japon on 11 October. She went to climbing location in Mount Tsukuba with Hideki Yamanaka, and announcers Yuko Aoki and Mai Demizu. Although she had appeared irregularly afterwards in SunJapo, she was in charge as a reporter at the information corner in the programme "Jōhō Live Minami-ya" which was converted into a corner from 12 September.

She would be in charge of Academy Night from 16 October. In the spring of 2014 it was the longest serving regular in charge of the program (until October 2013).

2010

She appeared as a female employee (assistant) at Tokyo Friend Park 2 from 29 March. She appeared until it ended in March 2011 (the final episode). She later became Mami Yamasaki no Sunday Good Support assistant from October 2010.

2011

From April, she was in charge of Risa Yoshiki no Enjoy Driving Sunday as assistant.

From 2 April, she would be in charge of assistance of Saturday Zubatto. She was originally scheduled until the morning absence of Ayu Yamanouchi, three years until the final episode on 29 March 2014.

On 25 June, she appeared in the TBS announcer recitation meeting The Little Prince held at the Museum of The Little Prince in Hakone and would play the role of the Rose.

She appeared on the film Fullmetal Alchemist: The Sacred Star of Milos released on 2 July as an announcer in the Resembool Station.

She later appeared in Nippon! Ijiru Z for a year and a half since 12 October. As foreign girl Amy, along with Koji Higashino (Leader Gomez) and Takashi Fujii (foreign boy Peter), they travelled all over Japan every week.

2012

She became assistant at the HIV/AIDS enlightenment event Red Ribbon Live 2012 Red Ribbon Dai Sakusen! –Anata wa HIV/AIDS Kensa ni Ikimasu ka?–' of DJ Shoo Yamamoto's comprehensive production held at Diversity Tokyo on 2 June.

She played the brand new pilot who operates the "No. 3D-BooBo" at the "3D-BooBo Tours" which is the eyeball of "Natsu Sacas 2012 –Egao no Tobira–" attraction at Akasaka Sacas from 21 July to 2 September.

2013

From 6 January, she was promoted as the moderator of SunJapo. In addition, she appeared in Toho film Kodomo Keisatsu released on 20 March.

2014

On 25 June, she announced on her blog that she would "retire TBS on 30th September 2014 and become a freelance announcer."

=== As a freelance announcer ===
After retiring from TBS, she belongs to the entertainment office TakeOff, which also includes Seiji Miyane and Shinichi Hatori. She continuously appeared on TBS TV's Ariyoshi Japon and Job Tune Ano Shokugyō no Himitsu butcha kemasu! and TBS Radio's Minami Tanaka Attaka Time and Job Tune R, and on 26 October she would make regular appearances for the first time on a station that is not from TBS at Fuji TV's News na Bansan-kai.

2016

She served as the main MC at Tokyo MX's information programme Hirukyun!, which started on 3 October. Tanaka would become the first regular in the daytime programme as one of the first MC in the information programme.

== Personal life ==
Tanaka and actor Kazuya Kamenashi married in 2026 and are expecting their first child. Both announced their marriage and pregnancy in a joint letter dated June 29, 2026, released on his official site and her agency's site. The couple met at a photoshoot and interview for the November 2023 issue of the lifestyle magazine, Maquia. They appeared together in the 2024 TV Asahi drama Destiny. They were reported as a couple on New Years day in 2024, but managed to keep their relationship private until the announcement.

== Currently appearing programmes ==
=== Television ===
- Ariyoshi Japon (TBS, 13 Jul, 10 Oct 2012 mid-morning–) MC, from TBS era
- Job Tune Ano Shokugyō no Himitsu butcha kemasu! (TBS, 2 Feb 2013 –) MC, from TBS era
- Shinobu Sakagami no Kata sete agetai TV (NTV, 5 May 2016 –) progress

=== Radio ===
- Minami Tanaka Attaka Time (TBS Radio, 3 Jan 2012 –)

== Former appearances and works ==
=== After leaving TBS ===
==== Television ====
- News na Bansan-kai (Fuji TV, Oct 2014 – Aug 2015) MC
- Jinmei Variety Atsumare Tanaka! (NHK G, 23 Sep 2015)
- 4-koma Conte Kishōtenketsu (NTV, 14 Oct mid-morning – 30 Dec 2015 mid-morning (Tue midnight)) MC
- Chimata no Real TV Coming Out! (Fuji TV, 16 Oct 2015 – 18 Mar 2016) MC
- Answers by fashion tv (BS Fuji, 8 Oct 2015 – 24 Mar 2016) narration
- Shiawase Tsuikyū Variety Kinyōbi no Kikitai Onna-tachi (Fuji TV, Apr–Aug 2016) progress
- Job Tune R (TBS Radio, 6 Apr 2013 – 31 Dec 2016)
- Chotto Zawatsuku Image Chōsa Moshikashite Zure teru? (KTV, Fuji TV, 23 Jan – 25 Dec 2017) MC
- Hirukyun! (Tokyo MX, 3 Oct 2016 – 29 Mar 2019) MC
- Azatokute Nani ga Warui no? (TV Asahi, 27 Sep 2019 – 24 Sep 2023) MC

==== Dramas ====
- Ex-Enthusiasts: MotoKare Mania (2019), Mugi Kurusu
- Daughter of Lupin (2019), Miwa Futaba
- Justice Monster (2019), Reika Ishimori
- M: Beloved One (2020), Reika Himeno
- North Light (2020)
- Ikiru Toka Shinu Toka Chichioya Toka (2021), Nanami Azuma
- Dearest (2021), Shiori Tachibana
- Kichijoji Losers (2022), Sakura Ohba
- Even If You Don't Do It (2023), Kaede Niina
- Black Forceps season 2 (2024), Misaki Shiino
- Plastic Beauty (2026)

==== Films ====
- Masquerade Night (2021), Kumiko Akiyama
- Will I Be Single Forever? (2021), Mami Honda
- Ichikei's Crow: The Movie (2023), Kanako Shimatani
- The Hotel of My Dream (2024)
- How to Generate a Perfect Crime (2026), Natsuki

==== Radio ====
- antenna*Tokyo Ongoing (Tokyo FM, 30 Apr 2016 – 30 Mar 2018)

==== Dubbing ====
- Doctor Strange (2017) – as the worrying doctor (Elizabeth Healey)
- Godzilla vs. Kong (2021) – as Maia Simmons (Eiza González)

==== Advertisements ====
- Eneos "Newscaster Suiso"-hen (Oct 2015 –)
- KDDI "Ariyoshi Jaoin-au Bar Minami" (Nov 2015 – Mar 2016)
- Sapporo Breweries "Chu-hai Relax" (2018)
- Open House "Yumemiru Sho-gakusei Hoken Shitsu" (2019)
- Peach John "Miracle Bra" (2021)

=== TBS era ===
==== Television ====
Regular appearances

- AnaCan (7 Apr – 22 Sep 2009)
- Academy Night (16 Oct 2009 – 10 Oct 2013)*Then broadcast on Thursday late night
- Evening Wide (8 Jan – 26 Mar 2010) – Friday advanced caster
- Tokyo Friend Park 2 (29 Mar 2010 – 28 Mar 2011 (Final episode, closed day)) – Employee
- N Sta (1 Apr 2010 – 1 Apr 2011) – "N Ten," "Enta horikomi'" Every Thursday/Friday
- JNN Flash News – Fridays
- King of Chair (20 Jul, 11 Oct 2010 – 1 Jan 2011)
- Sunday Japon (Progress-SunJapo journalist-"Jōhō Live Minami-ya" corner reporter/12 Sep 2010 – 28 Sep 2014)
- Saturday Zubatto. (2 Apr 2011 – 29 Mar 2014)
  - JNN News
- Sanma no Super Karakuri TV –
  "Buri-kko Joshi-ana Minami Tanaka vs Shizuchan" series (VTR appearances)
  "Sanma Ukiuki O-ten Hōmon" (broadcast 8 May 2011), etc.
- Nippon! Ijiru Z (13 Oct 2011 (12th late night) – 21 Mar 2013 (20th late night))
- SataNepu Best Ten (15 Oct 2011 – 1 Sep 2012)
- Bakuhō! The Friday (21 Oct 2011 – 19 Sep 2014)
- TBS News Bird (CS, around Nov 2011 – Sep 2012) – Every other Tuesday late night
- Joshi-ana no Batsu (Occasional appearances/16 Jul 2012 – 26 Mar 2014)
- Wedding Stage–Minna ga Shuyaku Wedding (narration/1 Oct 2013 – Sep 2014)

Irregular, single appearance, etc.

- All-Star Thanksgiving '09 Autumn (3 Oct 2009) – Reporter
- Announced! The 42nd Japan Cable Awards (20 Oct 2009) – Moderator
- Doors 2009 Gentō (28 Dec 2009) – Reporter
- Minakami no Chōsen-sha Special Eikō to Zasetsu no Yume Butai! Dai 45-kai SG Sōri Daijin-hai (22 Mar 2010) – Pit reporter of race boat relay
- Ai to Ikari no Gekihaku SP Konna Otoko Yame chaina Kuzumen Bokumetsu Iinkai! (13 Apr 2010) – Moderator
- Zenbu. (Apr–Sep 2010)
- King's Brunch (26 Jun 2010) – Apprentice as regular with Erina Masuda because regular Mai Demizu was absent on duty
- Hiroki Ando-Minami Tanaka no Iriomotejima Adventure Kikō (CS TBS Channel, initial broadcast 28 Aug 2010)
- Hiruobi! (8, 9 Sep 2010) – Appeared as a substitute for Hiroko Ogura at the time of summer vacation
- 52nd Japan Record Awards (30 Dec 2010) – Moderator
- CDTV Special Toshikoshi Premier Live 2010→2011 (31 Dec 2010 – 1 Jan 2011) – Moderator and reporter
- Sanma no Honto no Koi no Kamasawagi (13 Apr, 23 Aug 2011 broadcast) – Guest appearance
- Dai Hit no Ano Hon! Tameshite mimasu (9 Jul 2011 broadcast)
- Pittanko Kan Kan Special (14 Oct 2011 broadcast)
- Sanma Akashiya ga Honki de asu ni demo Sumitai Machi o Sagasu Tabi – Narration
  in Hawaii (3 Dec 2011 broadcast)
  in New Zealand (26 Jan 2014 broadcast)
- KAT-TUN no Sekaiichi Damena Yoru! (occasional appearances/Aug–Dec 2012)
- Dai Enjō-sei TV Ore ni mo Iwa sero! (28 Sep 2012 broadcast)
- Tsuini Kaikin! Chō Taikan Attraction Dekita! (7 Oct 2012 broadcast)
- TBS Wakate Director to Ishibashi no Doyō no 3-kai (occasional appearances/Oct 2012 broadcast)
- Morning Chance (28 Aug 2014) – as a substitute MC for Miku Natsume

Dramas

- Keigo Higashino Mystery Shinshun Drama Tokubetsu Kikaku Akai Yubi "Shinsanmono" Kyoichiro Futabi Futatabi! (3 Jan 2011) – as Kuzumochiya vendor
- Fuyu no Sakura (16 Jan 2011) – as Nurse
- Ikemen desu ne (15 Jul 2011) – as Welcome party female customer
- Miyuki Miyabe 4-Shū Renzoku "Gokujō" Mystery 2nd Night The Hunting of the Snark (14 May 2012) – as Wedding ceremony moderator
- Papadol! (28 Jun 2012)

==== Radio ====
- Battle Talk Radio Access Uchi Radio News (14 Sep, 1 Oct 2009)
- Yuri Osawa no YuYu Wide
  - Asa 8-Jidai no Radio News (15 Sep, 2, 7 Oct 2009 – Mar 2010) – Mainly on Wednesdays
- Saturday Sports Manager (10 Oct 2009 – 3 Apr 2010)
- Bakushō Mondai no Nichiyō Sunday (3 Jan, 30 May, 29 Aug 2010)
- Moe Murakami no Cutie Party (4 Oct – 30 Dec 2010) – Assistant
- Mami Yamasaki no Good Support Friday (10 Oct 2010 – 3 Apr 2011) – Assistant
- Risa Yoshiki no Enjoy Driving Sunday (10 Apr – 26 Jun 2011)

==== Magazines ====
- Weekly Playboy No. 15 (6 Apr 2009) – "Omedetō-ana Saku Sotsugyō" Two-shot with synchronous Ai Eto
- Big Comic Spirits No.10 (No. 20 Feb 2012) – Top gravure
- Weekly Playboy (Release No. 8 May 2011 – Sep 2014) Minami Tanaka no Minamin Minzemi – Serialisation
- Beautiful Lady & Television Minami Tanaka no Minahappy BLT-ban – Serialisation

==== Films ====
- Kodomo Keisatsu (Toho, 2013)

==== Webcasts ====
- TBS Female Announcement Division Minami Tanaka Announcer no Oshigoto (1 Jul 2010–12, 70 times in total

=== Activities before joining TBS ===
==== Magazines ====
- Weekly Young Jump No. 45 (23 Oct 2008) – Gravure

==== Films ====
- Short film Marianne no Maisō (New Cinema Works, 2004) – as Minatsu

== Bibliography ==
=== Photo book ===
- Sincerely yours...（13 Dec 2019 Takarajimasha）

== See also ==
- List of Japanese announcers
