= My Husband Won't Fit =

2019 Japanese-language television series

- Genre: Drama, Romance
- Starring: Natsumi Ishibashi; Aoi Nakamura
- Country of origin: Japan
- Original language: Japanese
- No. of seasons: 1
- No. of episodes: 10

Production
- Running time: 40 minutes

Original release
- Network: FOD (Japan); Netflix (Global)
- Release: March 20, 2019

My Husband Won't Fit (Japanese: 夫のちんぽが入らない, romanized: Otto no Chinpo ga Hairanai, lit. 'My Husband's Penis Won't Fit') is a Japanese-language television series starring Natsumi Ishibashi and Aoi Nakamura. The plot revolves around Kumiko (Natsumi Ishibashi) and Kenichi (Aoi Nakamura) who become a couple in college. Later they discover that they are physically incompatible, and problems emanate from a marriage that is not able to be consummated.

It was released on March 20, 2019 on Fuji TV's FOD streaming service in Japan and on Netflix globaly.

== Cast ==
- Natsumi Ishibashi
- Aoi Nakamura

== Release ==
My Husband Won't Fit was released on March 20, 2019, simultaniously on Fuji TV's FOD streaming service in Japan and on Netflix globaly (including Japan).

== Adaptations ==
A manga adaptation by Kodama, with art by Yukiko Gotō, was released in 2018 and serialized in Young Magazine.
