= Seira Anzai =

Japanese actress and model (born 2004)

- 安斉 星来
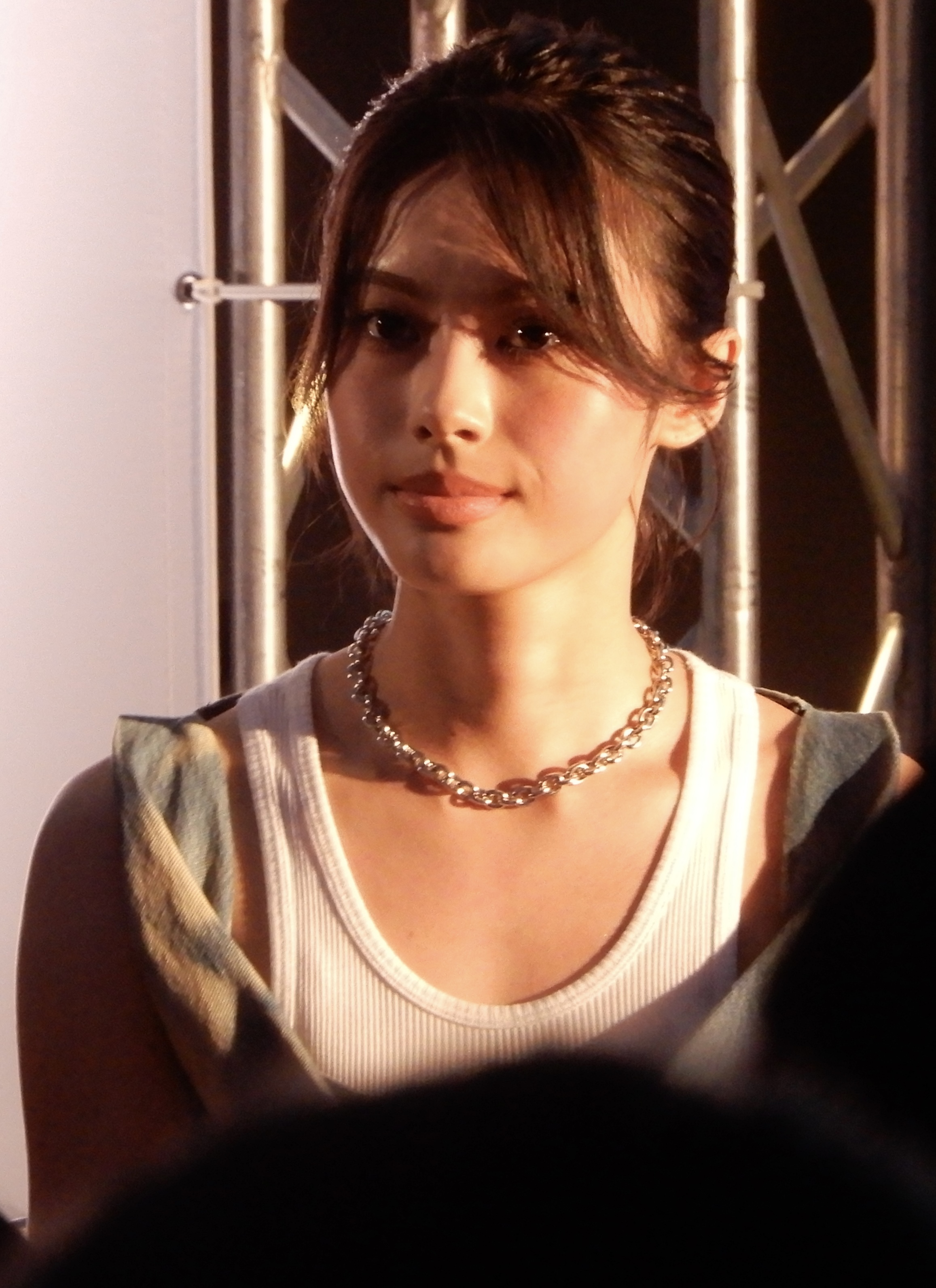
- Anzai in 2025
- Born: February 17, 2004 (age 22); Fujisawa, Kanagawa, Japan
- Occupations: Actress; model
- Years active: 2021–present
- Agent: Platinum Production
- Relatives: Kalen Anzai (sister)
- Modeling information
- Height: 166 cm (5 ft 5 in)
- Hair color: black
- Eye color: brown

Seira Anzai (Japanese: 安斉 星来, Hepburn: Anzai Seira; born February 17, 2004) is a Japanese actress and model. She is managed by the talent agency Platinum Production.

== Biography ==
Anzai was born on February 17, 2004, in Fujisawa City, Kanagawa Prefecture. Her older sister is singer and actress Kalen Anzai.

== Filmography ==
=== Film ===
Year	Title	Role	Notes	Ref.
2023	Insomniacs After School	Kanami Anami		
2024	Honeko Akabane's Bodyguards	Natsuno Managi		
2024	Saint Young Men The Movie: Holy Men vs Devil Corps	Navy in Girls		
2025	Re/Member: The Last Night	Misaki Hayakawa		
2026	In the Clear Moonlit Dusk	Yoi Takiguchi		

=== Television ===
Year	Title	Role	Notes	Ref.
2021	Nurarihyon's Home 2	Junna	Web series	
2022	Kamiya Utako Isn't Here at the Graduation Ceremony	Mizuki Yamazaki		
2022	Convenience Store Heroes: We've received your SOS!!	Suzu	Episode 4	
2023	Why Didn't I Tell You a Million Times?	Rio Ozaki (teen)		
2023	Learn the Meaning of Giving Up!	Tamao Kusakabe		
2023	Trillion Game	Kozue Futaba	Episode 4–6 and 10	
2023	Tokyo Poverty Girls: I Thought Poverty Would be Someone else's Problem	Lisa Ishioka Bautista		
2024	Captured New Airport	Usagi/ Kanade Hamamatsu		
2024	The Song of the Outcast	Seira	Web series	
2024	The Diamond Sleeping Under the Sea	Airi		
2025	Mr. Mikami's Classroom	Amane Oguri		
2026	Loved One	Suzune Matsubara		
2026	First Cry	Ichika Kishimoto		

== Bibliography ==
=== Photobook ===
- 1st photo book "Sirius" (July 5, 2023, Gentosha) ISBN 978-4-344-04129-5
