= M Aisubeki Hito ga Ite =

2019 book by Narumi Komatsu

- Japanese book cover
- Author: Narumi Komatsu
- Language: Japanese
- Genre: Non-fiction
- Publisher: Gentosha (JPN)
- Publication place: Japan
- Pages: 205
- ISBN: 978-4-344-03491-4

M: Beloved One (M 愛すべき人がいて, M Aisubeki Hito ga Ite) is a non-fiction novel written by Japanese author Narumi Komatsu, published on 1 August 2019, by Gentosha.

The novel is based on the biography of Japanese singer Ayumi Hamasaki from the period prior to her major debut as a singer, until the early 2000s, particularly on the aspects regarding Hamasaki's relationship with her executive producer, Max Matsuura.

The novel was a commercial success in Japan, selling 38,000 copies in its first week of release according to Oricon.

== Development ==
On August 1, 2018, a year before its publication, a conversation took place in a drinking session with Ayumi Hamasaki, Max Matsuura, and the president of CyberAgent, Susumu Fujita, in Nishi-Azabu, Tokyo. The conversation became lively, and on the spot, Fujita called Toru Kenjo, the president of Gentosha, saying, "If you turn this into a book, I’d love to make it into a film", thus initiating the project. As background, 2018 marked the 20th anniversary of Hamasaki’s debut, and with the new era transitioning from the Heisei to the Reiwa era, Hamasaki felt the need to express her determination to "keep singing" and "continue performing on stage". During discussions with Matsuura, she came to the idea of sharing "past memories to communicate that resolve".

Nonfiction writer Narumi Komatsu, who had experience interviewing figures like Ichiro Suzuki and Hidetoshi Nakata, was chosen to write the book. She began her research, saying, "I want to write about the birth of Ayumi Hamasaki, a major star of the Heisei era, and the romance behind it." Similar to any other nonfiction work, she conducted interviews with Hamasaki, Matsuura, and people around them over a period of 10 months, interviewing both of them together and separately. With their agreement, she gathered information about their past, from before they started dating to their breakup. Despite the events being over 20 years ago, both of them had vivid memories and spoke without hesitation about the past, with almost no revisions made to the manuscript.

While the book’s title states that it is "a fiction based on facts", Hamasaki contributed a quote on the book's cover, saying, "I loved one man so much that I nearly destroyed myself".

In non-fiction works, there are cases where episodes cannot be written due to the presence of real-life individuals, so the author chose to use the novel format. By focusing on a few characters, such as Hamasaki, Matsuura, and their manager, the story's narrative was enhanced. It is positioned as "a literary work based on facts" and, being a nonfiction writer, Komatsu refers to it as a "documentary novel" or "non-fiction novel".

== TV adaptation ==
M Aisubeki Hito ga Ite
- Also known as: M: Beloved One; M 愛すべき人がいて
- Genre: Romance, Drama, Music, Comedy
- Written by: Osamu Suzuki
- Directed by: Takao Kinoshita, Manabo Asō
- Starring: Kalen Anzai; Shohei Miura; Alan Shirahama; Minami Tanaka; Masanobu Takashima
- Opening theme: "M" by Ayumi Hamasaki
- Composer: Kan Sawada
- Country of origin: Japan
- Original language: Japanese
- No. of seasons: 1
- No. of episodes: 7

Production
- Running time: 50 minutes
- Production company: Kadokawa Daiei Studio

Original release
- Network: Abema; TV Asahi
- Release: April 18 – July 4, 2020

The novel was adapted to a television drama by TV Asahi and AbemaTV, with the first episode airing in April 2020. As a result of difficulties regarding filming during the COVID-19 pandemic, the story was shortened to only seven episodes.

=== Plot ===
Set in the 1990s, Ayu is a high school student aiming to pursue a career in the entertainment business. Living her childhood with her mother and grandmother in Fukuoka, while still being a teenager she decides to move to the capital Tokyo to live with her aunt. Ayu begins her modelling and acting career in a small talent agency and drops out of high school. However, her career does not seem to advance, as she only gets minor roles in B rate productions. One day, Ayu meets Masa, who is the executive director of record label A Victory. He decides take Ayu as his protégé, taking full responsibility of every aspect of her career in order to turn her into a successful singer. Ayu begins taking singing lessons, first in New York, and then in the A Victory academy, where she encounters difficulties and jealously by her classmates. On the other hand, Masa is continuously trying to prove himself against Director Ohama, renowned producer Tenmei Kira, and label associate Shō Rukawa. However, before Ayu's official debut with A Victory, her grandmother is taken back to be hospitalized in Fukuoka and later dies.

=== Changes from real events ===
There are characters that were specifically created for this adaptation, such as Shō Rukawa and Reika Himeno. Additionally, several real names were changed for this adaptation, such as the record label, A Victory (based on Avex Trax), as well as names of other contemporary artists such as Tenmei Kira (inspired by Tetsuya Komuro), USG (inspired by TRF), Over The Fact (inspired by Every Little Thing), or AXEL's (inspired by MAX). Hamasaki and Matsuura's real names are never mentioned in the drama; they are always referred to as merely Ayu and Masa. Hamasaki's time with Nippon Columbia was completely omitted from the drama.

=== Cast ===
- Kalen Anzai - Ayu
- Shohei Miura - Masa
- Alan Shirahama - Shō Rukawa
- Minami Tanaka - Reika Himeno
- Masanobu Takashima - Ohama
- Katsunori Takahashi - Nakatani
- Sayu Kubota - Risa Tamaki
- Mayuko Kawakita - Mika Nojima
- Michiko Tanaka - Asuka Yoshida
- Shinya Niiro - Tenmei Kira
- Yoshie Ichige - Sachiko
- Ayaka Den - Mari Nishitani
- Natsuhi Ueno - Satomi Shiina
- Kenta Mizue - Naoki Sayama
- Miki Mizuno - Mayumi Tenma

=== Spin-off series ===
A spin-off of the series based on the character of Reika Himeno, entitled L Reika no Shinjitsu (L 礼香の真実), premiered on the AbemaTV streaming service on 27 June 2020.
