= Insomniacs After School =

Japanese manga series by Makoto Ojiro

- First tankōbon volume cover, featuring Isaki Magari (top) and Ganta Nakami (bottom)

君は放課後インソムニア (Kimi wa Hōkago Insomunia)
- Genre: Drama; Romance; Slice of life
- Manga
- Written by: Makoto Ojiro
- Published by: Shogakukan
- English publisher: NA: Viz Media
- Magazine: Weekly Big Comic Spirits
- Original run: May 20, 2019 – August 21, 2023
- Volumes: 14
- Anime television series
- Directed by: Yūki Ikeda
- Produced by: Emi Kashimura; Kyouhei Nishikawa; Reiko Sasaki; Tomoki Ueda; Yuriko Tamada; Chiharu Nagai
- Written by: Rintarō Ikeda
- Music by: Yuki Hayashi
- Studio: Liden Films
- Licensed by: Sentai Filmworks: SEA: Muse Communication
- Original network: TXN (TV Tokyo)
- Original run: April 11, 2023 – July 4, 2023
- Episodes: 13
- Live-action film
- Insomniacs After School (2023)
- icon

Insomniacs After School (Japanese: 君は放課後インソムニア, Hepburn: Kimi wa Hōkago Insomunia) is a Japanese manga series written and illustrated by Makoto Ojiro. It was serialized in Shogakukan's seinen manga magazine Weekly Big Comic Spirits from May 2019 to August 2023. An anime television series adaptation produced by Liden Films aired from April to July 2023. A live-action film adaptation premiered in June 2023.

== Plot ==
In the small city of Nanao, insomniac Ganta Nakami tries to catch a nap in his school's abandoned astronomical observatory. There he stumbles upon a sociable and carefree girl named Isaki Magari who has the same problem. The two form an awkward friendship and reestablish their school's defunct astronomy club.

== Characters ==
Ganta Nakami (中見 丸太, Nakami Ganta)
Voiced by: Gen Satō (Japanese); Adam Gibbs (English)
Portrayed by: Daiken Okudaira
A high school student of Kuyo High School who suffers from insomnia. He comes off as grumpy and unfriendly due to his condition. However, after meeting Isaki, he opens up to the people around him and reveals to Isaki that the cause of his insomnia is due to separation anxiety caused by his mother leaving him and his father. Ganta is determined to protect the observatory and the revived Astronomy Club, of which he is the president. He becomes Isaki's boyfriend at the end of the club trip during the summer holiday of their first year. He aims to get into a university with a nursing program in Kanazawa, Ishikawa, inspired by his desire to always be at Isaki's side.
Isaki Magari (曲 伊咲, Magari Isaki)
Voiced by: Konomi Tamura (Japanese); Jad Saxton (English)
Portrayed by: Nana Mori
A cheerful high school girl who also suffers from insomnia like Ganta. She first discovered the abandoned observatory and made it her sleeping haven, until Ganta came along. As she and Ganta became closer, she shared to him that she is suffering a defective heart condition since birth which requires monthly examinations, frequent hospitalization, and even surgeries. She was the only other member of the Astronomy Club in her first year, and became the vice-president later in the winter of the same year. She started dating Ganta after his confession at the end of their club trip. Initially, she aimed for a university within Ishikawa Prefecture, until she managed to convince her mother to allow her to try for a university in Osaka. Although never mentioned in the manga, it is confirmed by the author that Isaki has Hypoplastic left heart syndrome.
Yui Shiromaru (白丸 結, Shiromaru Yui)
Voiced by: Haruka Tomatsu (Japanese); Elissa Cuellar (English)
Portrayed by: Minori Hagiwara
An alumna of the Astronomy Club who runs an arcade near Wakuraonsen Station. She taught Ganta the basics of astrophotography and often acts as the unofficial advisor of the club. She had a crush on a classmate but did not confess to him. Yui lives in a container house next to the arcade and owns a cat named Rollo.
Tao Ukegawa (受川 太鳳, Ukegawa Tao)
Voiced by: Seiichiro Yamashita (Japanese); Blake Weir (English)
Portrayed by: Kaisei Kamimura
Ganta's childhood friend and a member of the Student Council. He is composed and usually gives good advice to Ganta whenever the latter feels down.
Motoko Kanikawa (蟹川 モトコ, Kanikawa Motoko)
Voiced by: Lynn (Japanese); Brittney Karbowski (English)
Portrayed by: Rico Nagase
Isaki's friend and the daughter of the owners of an okonomiyaki restaurant. Nicknamed "Motoko Princess" and "Kani", she is perceived as selfish and attention-seeking but is also caring of her family and friends. Motoko has a rivalry with Ganta.
Kanami Anamizu (穴水 かなみ, Anamizu Kanami)
Voiced by: Natsumi Fujiwara (Japanese); Olivia Swasey (English)
Portrayed by: Seira Anzai
Isaki's athletic friend who is in the softball club. She has a crush on Hira-senpai of the baseball club. Kanami is often depicted as a strong tomboy but also has a cute side to her: hates ghost stories, likes sweets and love talk.
Mina Nono (野々 三奈, Nono Mina)
Voiced by: Sumire Morohoshi (Japanese); Hilary Haag (English)
Portrayed by: Honoka Kawasaki
Isaki's artistic friend who is in the art club. She has a younger brother in elementary school.
Usako Kurashiki (倉敷 兎子, Kurashiki Usako)
Voiced by: Mamiko Noto (Japanese); Patricia Duran (English)
Portrayed by: Yuki Sakurai
An alcohol- and cigarette-loving school nurse who is also the Astronomy Club's advisor, despite her zero knowledge of the stars. However, she provides many valuable life lessons to the students and can be responsible when the time comes.
Rui Haida (灰田 塁, Haida Rui)
Voiced by: Shō Karino (Japanese); Brandon Hearnsberger (English)
A blonde high schooler who likes partying and playing around. He quit the baseball club shortly after matriculation. He has had relationships before but seriously falls in love with Kanami. During the group's trip to Osaka, he confessed to Kanami but was rejected.
Haya Magari (曲 早矢, Magari Haya)
Voiced by: Sora Amamiya (Japanese); Natalie Rial (English)
Portrayed by: Haruka Kudō
Isaki's sister, who is four years older. She is a university student currently studying with her boyfriend in Kanazawa. After a sports festival during their elementary years, Haya told herself she should not feel sorry for her sister. Despite their everyday quarrels, she is shown to be caring for Isaki and trusts Ganta to take good care of her sister completely.
Kai Shiromaru (白丸 甲斐, Shiromaru Kai)
Yui's cousin, who is one year younger than Ganta and Isaki. He joins the Astronomy Club and becomes the next president when Ganta retired from club activities.
Akane Furukimi (古君 茜, Furukimi Akane)
Ganta and Isaki's underclassman, who is one year younger. She joins the Astronomy Club along with her friend Suzu because she likes photography.
Suzu Chiura (千浦すず, Chiura Suzu)
Ganta and Isaki's underclassman, who is one year younger. She joins the Astronomy Club due to her love for science and astronomy.

== Media ==
=== Manga ===
Written and illustrated by Makoto Ojiro, Insomniacs After School was serialized in Shogakukan's seinen manga magazine Weekly Big Comic Spirits from May 20, 2019, to August 21, 2023. Shogakukan collected its chapters in 14 tankōbon volumes, released from September 12, 2019, to October 12, 2023.

In June 2022, Viz Media announced that they licensed the series for English publication. On May 9, 2023, Viz Media launched their Viz Manga digital manga service, with the series' chapters receiving simultaneous English publication in North America as they are released in Japan.

==== Volumes ====
No.	Original release date	Original ISBN	English release date	English ISBN
1	September 12, 2019	978-4-09-860395-4	March 21, 2023	978-1-9747-3657-7
1. "Noto Star" (能登星, Noto Hoshi); 2. "Twin Stars" (二つ星, Futatsu Hoshi); 3. "Dawn Star" (夜明け星, Yoake Hoshi); 4. "Morning Star" (朝星, Asahoshi); 5. "Cat's Eye Stars" (猫の目星, Neko no meboshi); 6. "Noto Glare" (ノトニラミ, Notonirami); 7. "Two Brightest" (リョウワケ, Ryouwake); 8. "Rainfall Star" (雨降り星, Amefuriboshi)
2	December 12, 2019	978-4-09-860457-9	June 20, 2023	978-1-9747-3703-1
9. "Incoming Star" (入り星, Hairi-boshi); 10. "Evening Star" (日暮れ星, Higure Hoshi); 11. "Guidance Star" (相談星, Sōdan Hoshi); 12. "Brightest Star" (一つ星さん, Hitotsu-boshi-san); 13. "Umbrella Star" (川掘り星, Kawa hori-boshi); 14. "Flustered Star" (周章星, Shūshō Hoshi); 15. "Chaos Star" (天津甕星, Amatsumikaboshi); 16. "Cooking Star" (飯炊き星, Meshitaki Hoshi); 17. "Springing Star" (飛び上がり星, Tobiagari-boshi); 18. "Nestled Stars" (寄り合い星, Yoriai Hoshi)
3	April 10, 2020	978-4-09-860573-6	September 19, 2023	978-1-9747-4042-0
19. "Net-Catching Star" (網取り星, Amitori Hoshi); 20. "Running Star" (走り星, Hashiri Hoshi); 21. "Paint Star" (絵の具星, Enogu Hoshi); 22. "Trial Star" (試し星, Tameshi Hoshi); 23. "White Star" (白星, Shiroboshi); 24. "Barefoot Star" (足洗い星, Ashi Arai Hoshi); 25. "Fireworks Star (Part 1)" (花火星(前編), Hanabi Hoshi (Zenpen)); 26. "Fireworks Star (Part 2)" (花火星(後編), Hanabi Hoshi (Kōhen)); 27. "Contract of the Stars" (星の契, Hoshinochigiri)
4	August 7, 2020	978-4-09-860692-4	December 19, 2023	978-1-9747-4104-5
28. "Radio Star" (ラジオ星, Rajio Hoshi); 29. "Timeless Star" (時知らず, Toki-shirazu); 30. "Older Sister Star" (アネサマ星, Anesama Hoshi); 31. "Work Star" (仕事星, Shigoto Hoshi); 32. "Gathering Star" (集まり星, Atsumari Hoshi); 33. "Windmill Star" (風車星, Kazaguruma Hoshi); 34. "Rainy Night Star" (雨夜の星, Amayonohoshi); 35. "Sitting Star" (腰掛け星, Koshikake-boshi); 36. "Silver Bay" (銀湾, Gin-wan); 37. "Meeting of the Stars" (星合, Hoshiai)
5	December 11, 2020	978-4-09-860781-5	March 19, 2024	978-1-9747-4321-6
38. "Crux" (十字架, Jūjika); 39. "The Cat's Eyes" (ネコノメ, Nekonome); 40. "Alcor" (輔星, Hosei); 41. "Boat Star" (船星, Funaboshi); 42. "Big Sister Star" (姉はん星, Ane-han-boshi); 43. "Sandal Star" (草履星, Zōri Hoshi); 44. "Brightest Star at Dawn" (夜明けの一番星, Yoake no Ichibanboshi); 45. "Roof-Shaped Star" (屋形星, Yakata Hoshi); 46. "Lunar Mansion" (星宿, Seishuku); 47. "Destiny" (星回, Hoshimawa)
6	April 12, 2021	978-4-09-860879-9	June 18, 2024	978-1-9747-4580-7
48. "Pants-Stealing Star" (脚布奪い星, Kyakufu Ubai Hoshi); 49. "Breakfast Star" (朝飯星, Asameshi Hoshi); 50. "The 16th Night" (十六夜, Izayoi); 51. "Lost Star ("迷い星, Mayoi Hoshi); 52. "Child's Star" (子の星, Nenohoshi); 53. "Oldest Star" (最古の星, Saiko no Hoshi); 54. "Ancient Tanabata" (古七夕, Ko-Tanabata); 55. "Star After Tanabata" (七夕の後星, Tanabata no Ato Hoshi)
7	October 29, 2021	978-4-09-861142-3	September 17, 2024	978-1-9747-4879-2
56. "Summer Day Star" (夏日星, Natsu Hiboshi); 57. "Starship" (星の船, Hoshi no Fune); 58. "A Group of Stars" (星団, Seidan); 59. "Tea Star" (お茶炊き星, Ochataki-boshi); 60. "Dancing Girl Star" (踊り子星, Odoriko Hoshi); 61. "Flying Star" (飛星, Hiboshi); 62. "Pole Star" (竿星, Sao Hoshi); 63. "Soaring Star" (奔星, Honsei); 64. "Star-running" (星走る, Hoshi Hashiru)
8	January 12, 2022	978-4-09-861215-4	December 17, 2024	978-1-9747-4947-8
65. "Autumn Star" (秋星, Akiboshi); 66. "Warehouse Star" (倉鍵, Kurakagi); 67. "Sunup Star" (晨星, Shinsei); 68. "Desk Star" (机星, Tsukueboshi); 69. "Heart Star" (こころ星, Kokoroboshi); 70. "Star Wind" (星風, Hoshi-fū); 71. "Space Storm" (宇宙嵐, Uchū Arashi); 72. "Full Moon" (望月, Mochizuki)
9	June 10, 2022	978-4-09-861314-4	March 18, 2025	978-1-9747-5213-3
73. "Cold Star" (寒さ星, Samu-sa-boshi); 74. "Ball Scoop Star" (玉の杓星, Tama no shaku Hoshi); 75. "Parent-Carrier Star" (親荷い星, Oyanii Hoshi); 76. "Car Star" (車星, Kurumabosih); 77. "Star Lodging" (星の宿, Hoshi no Yado); 78. "Falling Star" (落星, Ochiboshi); 79. "Dragon-Carrier Star" (籠担ぎ星, Kagokatsugi-boshi); 80. "Heart Star" (心星, Kokoroboshi)
10	September 12, 2022	978-4-09-861428-8	June 17, 2025	978-1-9747-5572-1
81. "Star Window" (星窓, Hoshimado); 82. "Crab's Eyes" (蟹の目, Kaninome); 83. "Bright Day" (白日, Hakujitsu); 84. "Snowy Star" (雪星, Yukiboshi); 85. "Two Stars" (二星, Niboshi); 86. "Mother Star" (母星, Bosei); 87. "Grid Star" (一升星, Ichi-shō Hoshi); 88. "Star Pond" (星池, Hoshi-chi); 89. "Laughing Star" (笑星, Emiboshi)
11	January 12, 2023	978-4-09-861499-8	October 21, 2025	978-1-9747-5804-3
90. "Thawing Star" (雪解星, Yukido Hoshi); 91. "Younger Brother Star" (弟星, Otōto Hoshi); 92. "Star of Memories" (おもいで星, Omoide Hoshi); 93. "Second-class Star" (二等星, Nitōsei); 94. "Birth Star" (誕生星, Tanjō Hoshi); 95. "New Astronomer" (新天体, Shin tentai); 96. "Supernova" (超新星, Chōshinsei); 97. "Octopus Star" (蛸星, Tako Hoshi); 98. "Next Star" (先星, Saki Hoshi)
12	April 6, 2023	978-4-09-861613-8	December 16, 2025	978-1-9747-5805-0
99. "Festival Star" (祭星, Matsuri Hoshi); 100. "Hundreds of Stars" (百星, Hyaku Hoshi); 101. "Walking Star" (歩き星, Arukiboshi); 102. "Four-season Star" (四季星, Shiki Hoshi); 103. "Home Star"家星 (Ie Hoshi); 104. "Learning Star" (学び星, Manabi-boshi); 105. "Star of Determination" (決意星, Ketsui Hoshi); 106. "Snow-thawing Star" (雪解け星, Yukidoke Hoshi); 107. "Bookmark Star" (栞星, Shiori Hoshi)
13	June 12, 2023	978-4-09-861721-0	February 24, 2026	978-1-9747-6215-6
108. "High Voltage Star" (高鳴星, Kō mei Hoshi); 109. "West Star" (西星, Nishi Hoshi); 110. "Roaring Star" (轟星, Todoroki Hoshi); 111. "Sweetness Star" (甘味星, Kanmiboshi); 112. "Window Star" (窓星, Madoboshi); 113. "Disorder Star" (乱星, Ran Hoshi); 114. "Word Star" (言葉星, Kotoba Hoshi); 115. "Access Star" (接近星, Sekkin Hoshi); 116. "Promise Star" (約束星, Yakusoku Hoshi)
14	October 12, 2023	978-4-09-862536-9	June 23, 2026	978-1-9747-6399-3
117. "Gargle Star" (ガラガラ星, Garagara Hoshi); 118. "Prayer Star" (祈星, Inori Hoshi); 119. "Upright Star" (仰星, Gyōsei); 120. "Field Star" (源氏星, Genjiboshi); 121. "Deep Star" (深閑星, Shinkan Hoshi); 122. "Night Wind Star" (夜風星, Yokaze Hoshi); 123. "Bright Star" (明星, Myōjō); 124. "Independent Star" (巣立ち星, Sudachi Hoshi); 125. "Nine-light Star" (九曜の星, Kuyōnohoshi)

=== Anime ===
In January 2022, an anime television series adaptation was announced. The series is produced by Liden Films and directed by Yūki Ikeda, with scripts written by Rintarō Ikeda, character designs handled by Yuki Fukuda, and music composed by Yuki Hayashi. It aired from April 11 to July 4, 2023, on TV Tokyo and other channels. (Note: TV Tokyo lists the premiere for the series on Monday at 24:00, which is effectively Tuesday at midnight JST.) The opening theme song is "Itsu Aetara" (いつ逢えたら; "When Can We Meet?") by Aiko, while the ending theme song is "Lapse" (ラプス, Rapusu) by Homecomings.

Sentai Filmworks licensed the series and is streaming it on Hidive. An English dub was later released starting in November 2024. Muse Communication has licensed the series in Southeast Asia.

==== Episodes ====
No.	Title	Directed by (Note: Information is taken from the ending credits of each episode.)	Written by	Storyboarded by	Original release date
1	"Capella"; Transliteration: "Notoboshi: Giyoshiyaza Kapera" (Japanese: 能(の)登(と)星(ぼし) ぎよしや座力ぺラ)	Yūki Ikeda	Rintarō Ikeda	Yūki Ikeda	April 11, 2023
2	"Upsilon and Lambda Scorpii"; Transliteration: "Neko no Meboshi: Sasoriza no Nibanboshi" (Japanese: 猫(ねこ)の⽬(め)星(ぼし) さそり座の二番星)	Taisuke Mamoru	Rintarō Ikeda	Tomoko Akiyama	April 18, 2023
3	"Fomalhaut"; Transliteration: "Hitotsu Boshisan: Fuōmaruhauto" (Japanese: ⼀(ひと)つ星(ぼし)さん フオーマル(うわ座)ハウト)	Ikuhiro Matsui	Rintarō Ikeda	Yūki Ikeda	April 25, 2023
4	"Venus"; Transliteration: "Amatsumikaboshi: Kanaboshi" (Japanese: 天(あま)津(つ)甕(みか)星(ぼし) 金星)	Rokō Ogiwara	Rintarō Ikeda	Kenji Setō	May 2, 2023
5	"Canopus"; Transliteration: "Tobiagariboshi: Riyūkotsuhoshi Kanōpusu" (Japanese: ⾶(と)び上(あ)がり星(ぼし) りゅうこつ星 力ノープス)	Yasuyuki Shinozaki	Rintarō Ikeda	Michio Fukuda, Kenji Setō, Yūichi Itō	May 9, 2023
6	"Running Star: Shooting Star"; Transliteration: "Hashiriboshi: Ryūsei" (Japanese: 走(はし)り星(ぼし) 流星)	Taisuke Mamoru	Rintarō Ikeda	Taisuke Mamoru	May 16, 2023
7	"The Fireworks Star: Pleiades Star"; Transliteration: "Hanabiboshi: Pureadesu Hoshi" (Japanese: 花(な)⽕(び)星(ぼし) プレアデス星团)	Kazuya Fujishiro	Rintarō Ikeda	Tomoko Akiyama	May 23, 2023 (Note: This episode aired at 12:30 a.m. JST, 30 minutes after the original air time on TV Tokyo.)
8	"The Congregation Star: Pleiades Star"; Transliteration: "Atsumariboshi: Pureadesu Hoshi" (Japanese: 集(あつ)まり星(ぼし) プレアデス星团)	Daiki Handa	Rintarō Ikeda	Satoshi Shimizu	May 30, 2023
9	"Star Meeting: Altair and Vega"; Transliteration: "Hoshiai: Arutairu Bega" (Japanese: 星(ほし)合(あい) アルタイル・ベガ)	Rokō Ogiwara	Rintarō Ikeda	Yūichi Itō	June 6, 2023
10	"Spica of Virgo"; Transliteration: "Anehanboshi: Otomeza Supica" (Japanese: 姉(あね)はん星(ぼし) 乙女座スピ力)	Sōta Yokote	Rintarō Ikeda	Sōta Yokote	June 13, 2023
11	"The First Stars of Dawn: Pleiades Star"; Transliteration: "Yoake no Ichibanboshi: Pureadesu Hoshi" (Japanese: 夜(よ)明(あ)けの一(いち)番(ばん)星(ぼし) プレアデス星团)	Kazunari Araki	Rintarō Ikeda	Tomoko Akiyama	June 20, 2023
12	"Wandering Star: Planet"; Transliteration: "Mayoiboshi: Wakusei" (Japanese: 迷(まよ)い星(ぼし) 惑星)	Satoshi Toba	Rintarō Ikeda	Sōta Yokote, Yūki Ikeda	June 27, 2023
13	"The Last Star: Methuselah"; Transliteration: "Saikoboshi: Metotsuera" (Japanese: 最(さい)古(こ)の星(ぼし) メトツエラ)	Yūki Ikeda, Kayonaka Yamada	Rintarō Ikeda	Shinobu Yoshioka	July 4, 2023

=== Film ===
In January 2022, a live-action film adaptation was announced. The film is directed by Chihiro Ikeda, produced by United Productions, and distributed by Pony Canyon. It premiered on June 23, 2023. The film was later selected by Fantasia Film Festival, to be presented at the 2023 edition.

=== Other media ===
The Japanese band Macaroni Empitsu released a music video for their single "Enshin" (遠心; "Centrifuge"), which featured art from the manga, on November 21, 2019.

== Reception ==
In 2020, Insomniacs After School was one of the 50 nominees for the 6th Next Manga Awards in the print category. Insomniacs After School also won the Mandō Kobayashi Manga Grand Prix 2023, created by comedian and manga enthusiast Kendo Kobayashi. The series was also listed in the top 10 in the 2024 edition of the Young Adult Library Services Association's Great Graphic Novels for Teens.
