= Mother (2020 film) =

2020 Japanese drama film by Tatsushi Ōmori

- Directed by: Tatsushi Ōmori
- Screenplay by: Tatsushi Ōmori; Takehiko Minato
- Produced by: Junko Sato
- Starring: Masami Nagasawa; Daiken Okudaira; Kaho; Sarutoki Minagawa; Taiga Nakano; Kaho Tsuchimura; Zenki Aramaki; Shima Onishi; Hana Kino; Sadao Abe
- Cinematography: Tomohiko Tsuji
- Edited by: Ryo Hayano
- Music by: Taro Iwashiro
- Production company: Star Sands
- Distributed by: Star Sands; Kadokawa
- Release date: July 3, 2020 (Japan)
- Country: Japan
- Language: Japanese
- Box office: ¥220 million

Mother (stylized as MOTHER マザー) is a 2020 Japanese drama film released on July 3, 2020. The film received a PG12 rating in Japan.

It was directed by Tatsushi Ōmori and stars Masami Nagasawa. The film was inspired by a real-life 2014 case in which a teenage boy killed his grandparents, and was developed from Kaori Yamadera's nonfiction book Dare mo Boku o Mite Inai: Naze 17-sai no Shōnen wa, Sofubo o Satsugai Shita no ka (Nobody Was Watching Me: Why Did a 17-Year-Old Boy Kill His Grandparents?), published by Poplar Publishing.

== Plot ==
Akiko Misumi grew up in an ordinary family, but developed a troubled lifestyle and became a single mother after giving birth to her son Shuhei at a young age. Unable to hold down a job, Akiko moves from one man to another and rarely sends Shuhei to elementary school. Despite this, Shuhei quietly continues to obey his mother.

Akiko readily uses the men in her life to commit fraud and sends Shuhei to solicit loans on her behalf. She avoids putting herself directly at risk and repeatedly insists that how she chooses to raise her own child is nobody else's business.

Rather than becoming rebellious or delinquent, Shuhei grows into a withdrawn young man who remains completely obedient to his mother. By this time, Akiko has also given birth to Fuyuka, Shuhei's young half-sister.

== Cast ==
- Masami Nagasawa as Akiko Misumi
- Daiken Okudaira as Shuhei
  - Sho Gunji as young Shuhei
- Sadao Abe as Ryō Kawada
- Kaho as Aya Takahashi
- Sarutoki Minagawa as Mamoru Ujita
- Taiga Nakano as Keiichi Akagawa
- Kaho Tsuchimura as Kaede Misumi
- Zenki Aramaki as Matsuura, president of Tsukuba Urban Greening
- Shima Onishi as Akiko's ex-husband
- Hana Kino as Masako Misumi
- Haro Asada as Fuyuka Misumi
- Taka Takao as Katsuhide Misumi
- Yasumasa Oba as a lawyer
- Chisato Kobayashi as Ogawa, a child consultation center employee
- Katsuya Kobayashi as an elderly man
- Rina Hagiwara
- Seigo Uno as a ryokan employee
- Daisuke Matsuki
- Akihiro Yamamoto as a free-school teacher
- Naota Okawara
- Kagetora Miura
- Rei Tamura
- Takahito Asagi as a child consultation center employee
- Yoshihiro Kim as a moneylender
- Yoshinori Ito
- Masashi Kitaura
- Takahiro Ono
- Go Masago

== Production ==
- Director: Tatsushi Ōmori
- Screenplay: Tatsushi Ōmori, Takehiko Minato
- Planning, production and executive producer: Mitsunobu Kawamura
- Producer: Junko Sato
- Co-producers: Ryuji Kanai, Shunsuke Suzuki, Keizo Okamoto, Masahiro Iida
- Cinematography: Tomohiko Tsuji
- Lighting: Reiji Okubo
- Sound recording: Shinya Takada
- Casting: Tsuyoshi Sugino
- Production design: Kiyotaka Ohara
- Costume design: Haruki Koketsu
- Hair and makeup: Kyoko Toyokawa
- Assistant director: Yuki Kondo
- Production manager: Kaoru Mimura
- Title design: Hicozo Akamatsu
- Still photography: Masahiro Miki
- Editing: Ryo Hayano
- Line producer: Soichiro Koga
- Subsidized by: Agency for Cultural Affairs subsidy for the promotion of culture and the arts (Film Creation Support Project), Japan Arts Council
- Distribution: Star Sands, Kadokawa
- Production company: Star Sands
- Production cooperation: SS Kobo
- Lead production companies: Happinet, Kadokawa
- Production: MOTHER Production Committee (Happinet, Kadokawa, The Asahi Shimbun Company, Star Sands, Gaga Corporation, Aeon Entertainment, TBS Radio, Filmarks)

== Reception ==
In Kinejun Review, published by KINENOTE, a website operated by Kinema Junpo, film critic Atsuko Kawaguchi praised the film's visual restraint, particularly its use of contrasting shots and its decision not to emphasize the boy's clenched fist with a close-up. Tōru Sano described the film as a masterpiece, writing that rather than merely confronting viewers with a cruel reality, it contains a quiet insight into the precariousness of human existence. Kenji Fukuma awarded the film a perfect score, stating that he could not stop trembling at what the film had exposed and forced its audience to confront.

== Accolades ==
- 33rd Nikkan Sports Film Awards – Best Actress: Masami Nagasawa, jointly for Mother and The Confidence Man JP: Princess
- 75th Mainichi Film Awards – Best Japanese Film (2020)
- 44th Japan Academy Film Prize
  - Best Actress – Masami Nagasawa, also recognized for The Confidence Man JP: Princess
  - Newcomer of the Year – Daiken Okudaira

== See also ==
- Dysfunctional family
- Child abuse
