= Daiken Okudaira =

Japanese actor (born 2003)

- 奥平 大兼
- Born: September 20, 2003 (age 23); Tokyo, Japan
- Occupation: Actor
- Years active: 2018–present
- Agent: Stardust Promotion

Daiken Okudaira (奥平 大兼, Okudaira Daiken; born September 20, 2003) is a Japanese actor from Tokyo, Japan.

== Career ==
Okudaira began his career when he auditioned for the thriller drama film Mother in November 2018. He was officially selected for the role of Shuhei, despite having no prior acting experience.

On June 23, 2023, he starred in the movie adaptation of Insomniacs After School, playing the lead male character, Ganta Nakami.

== Filmography ==
=== Film ===
Year	Title	Role	Notes	Ref.
2020	Mother	Shuhei		
2022	My Small Land	Sota		
2023	Nemesis: The Mystery of the Golden Spiral	Joi Himekawa		
2023	Village	Ryuta Kakei		
2023	Insomniacs After School	Ganta Nakami	Lead role	
2023	The Lump in My Heart	Koki		
2024	Play!	Shōta Ganji	Lead role	
2024	The Parades	Ryo		
2024	Cloud	Sano		
2024	Honeko Akabane's Bodyguards	Sumihiko Somejima		
2025	I Have a S/e/c/r/e/t/	Kyo Otsuka	Lead role	
2025	Yukikaze	Sota Inoue		

=== Television ===
Year	Title	Role	Notes	Ref.
2022	Blue Box Briefing	Katōgi	Lead role; mini-series	
2023	The Greatest Teacher	Tōru Hoshizaki		
2025	Mr. Mikami's Classroom	Takuto Kanzaki		

== Awards and nominations ==
Year	Award	Category	Work(s)	Result	Ref.
2021	44th Japan Academy Film Prize	Newcomer of the Year	Mother	Won	
2021	94th Kinema Junpo Awards	Best New Actor	Mother	Won	
2021	63rd Blue Ribbon Awards	Best Newcomer	Mother	Won	
2025	79th Mainichi Film Awards	Best Supporting Performance	Cloud	Nominated	
