= Insomniacs After School (film) =

2023 Japanese film

- Official movie poster
- Japanese: 君は放課後インソムニア
- Directed by: Chihiro Ikeda
- Screenplay by: Izumi Takahashi; Chihiro Ikeda
- Based on: Insomniacs After School by Makoto Ojiro
- Produced by: Yusuke Terada; Kazumi Matsui; Seiya Horio; Shoichi Ishikawa; Reiko Sasaki
- Starring: Nana Mori; Daiken Okudaira
- Music by: Nobuaki Shinzawa
- Production company: United Productions
- Distributed by: Pony Canyon
- Release date: June 23, 2023 (Japan)
- Running time: 113 minutes
- Country: Japan
- Language: Japanese

Insomniacs After School (Japanese: 君は放課後インソムニア, Hepburn: Kimi wa Hōkago Insomunia) is a Japanese film based on the manga of the same name by Makoto Ojiro. The film was released on June 23, 2023.

== Cast ==
- Nana Mori as Isaki Magari
- Daiken Okudaira as Ganta Nakami
- Yuki Sakurai as Usako Kurashiki
- Minori Hagiwara as Yui Shiromaru
- Kaisei Kamimura as Tao Ukegawa
- Seira Anzai as Kanami Anamizu
- Rico Nagase as Motoko Kanikawa
- Honoka Kawasaki as Mina Nono

== Plot ==
High school student from Nanao, Ishikawa Prefecture, Ganta Nakami is unable to sleep due to insomnia, and suffers from headaches and drowsiness at school, making him moody and causing his classmates to shun him. He is a gloomy student. There is a small observatory on the roof of Ganta's high school, but it is now used as a storage room. One day, Ganta enters the observatory and meets his classmate Isaki Magari, who also suffers from insomnia and sleeps in the observation room.

Ganta feels at home at the observatory and tries to revive the disbanded astronomy club so that it can continue to be used. He plans a stargazing event to show his activity, and begins to show his active side by asking the students for their cooperation. However, the event is canceled due to heavy rain.

Ganta is depressed and cries that everything is ruined because of him. Isaki tries to comfort him and reveals that she has a heart defect. Looking for a new activity to gain the approval of the Astronomy Club, Ganta and Isaki plan a photography trip with the aim of winning an astronomy photography contest. Isaki gets permission from her parents to go on the trip on the condition that her sister, Haya, accompanies her.

The accompaniment was an excuse, and her sister Haya went on a trip with her boyfriend, leaving Ganta and the others behind. When this was discovered, Isaki was brought back by her parents. Ganta and Isaki escape before their parents come to pick them up, and filmed all night. However, Isaki's illness worsened and she collapsed, and she was re-admitted to hospital. Ganta was forbidden to see Isaki. However, he had become so strong that he tried to hold another stargazing party.

Ganta bows to Isaki's mother, asking her to give him the photo that won him the prize in the contest. Isaki, who appears from the second-floor window, smiles and says, "I love you!" The stargazing party is a success, Isaki is safely discharged from the hospital, and the two of them have a bright high school life.

== Production ==
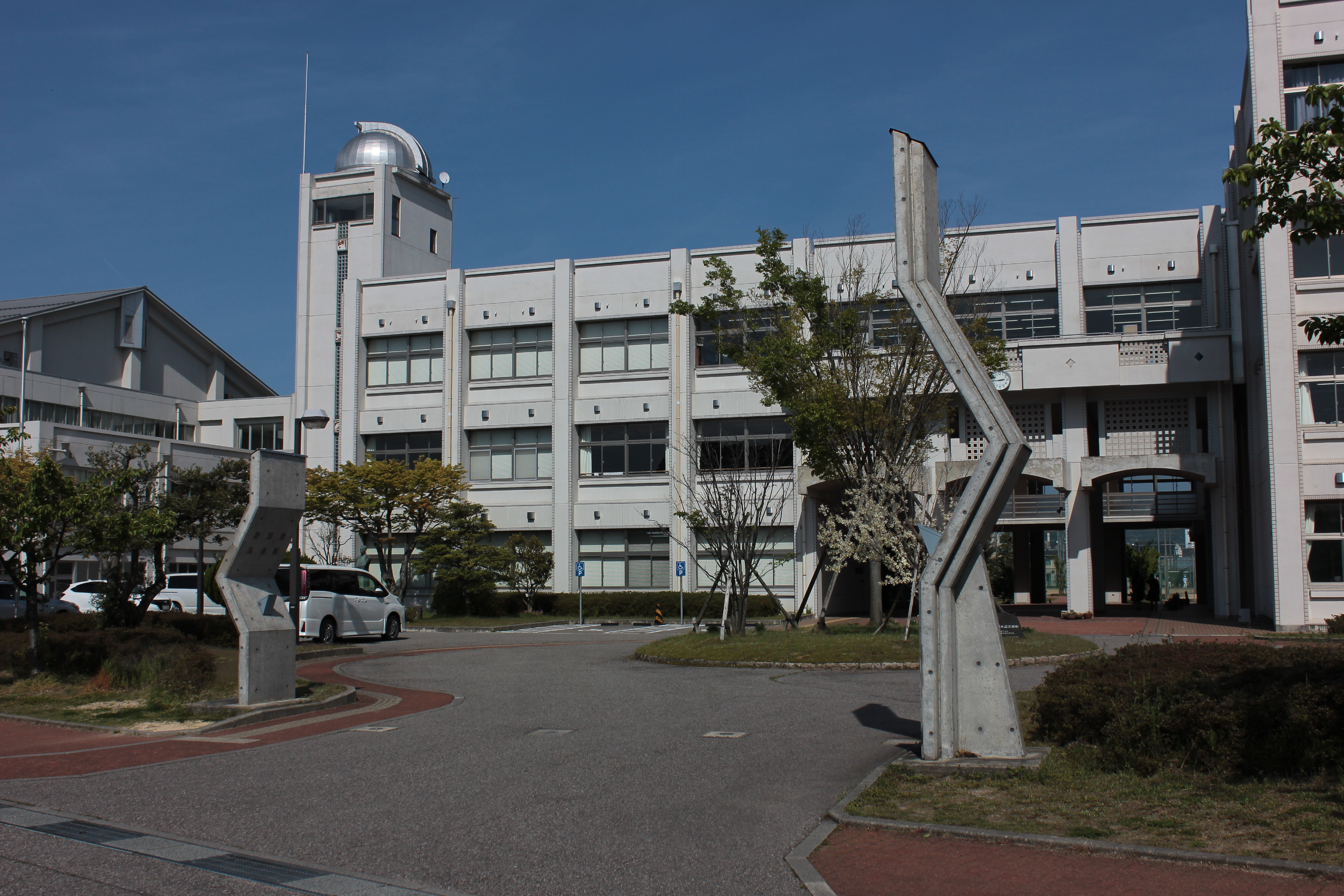
Photo of Ishikawa Prefectural Nanao High School

In January 2022, it was announced that the manga will be receiving an anime and live-action adaptation. The film was planned and produced by United Productions. Chihiro Ikeda was in charge of the directing, while Izumi Takahashi and Chihiro Ikeda was in charge of the screenplay.

The movie was filmed in various locations in Noto Peninsula such Nanao City, the Ishikawa Prefectural Nanao High School, and Mawaki Site.

== Release ==
The film was released on June 26, 2023, and later selected by Fantasia Film Festival to be presented at the 2023 edition.

== Accolades ==
Year	Award	Category	Recipient	Result	Ref.
2023	15th Tama Film Awards	Best New Actor	Okudaira Daiken	Won	
