= Makoto Ojiro =

Manga artist

Makoto Ojiro オジロ マコト
- Born: 1982 (age 43–44) Saitama Prefecture, Japan
- Area: Manga artist
- Notable works: Insomniacs After School

Makoto Ojiro (オジロ マコト, Ojiro Makoto; born 1982) is a Japanese manga artist from Saitama Prefecture. She is known for her work Insomniacs After School.

== Biography ==
Makoto Ojiro was born in 1982. started working as an assistant for another manga artist Masashi Asaki when she was 19. She made her debut in Weekly Young Magazine four years later in 2006.

== Works ==
- Katekin (2006–2008)
- Nude: AV Joyū Mihiro Tanjō Monogatari (2009–2010)
- Koibito 8-gō (2010)
- ZOO FACTORY (2011) (one-shot)
- Fujiyama-san wa Shishunki (2012–2016)
- Neko no Otera no Chion-san (2016–2018)
- Insomniacs After School (2019–2023)
- Hoshino-kun, Shitagatte! (星野くん、したがって！) (2024)
- Shisutarejisuta (しすたれじすた) (2024–present) – Collaboration with Mari Okada

== Charity works ==
From 3 May to 2 June 2024, a special event was held in Nanao by Makoto aiming to support the city after it was hit by the 2024 Noto earthquake. With the help of the manga publisher Shogakukan, the proceeds from the sales of her manga, Insomniacs After School—which is set in Nanao—will be donated to the city's relief fund for one year, from 16 April 2024 to 15 April 2025.

== Accolades ==
Makoto won the 2016 Bros Comic Awards for her work on Neko no Otera no Chion-san. Her work Hoshino-kun, Shitagatte! was nomintated for the 8th Saitō Takao Award.
