= Kalen Anzai =

Japanese pop singer actress (born 1999)

Kalen Anzai 安斉かれん
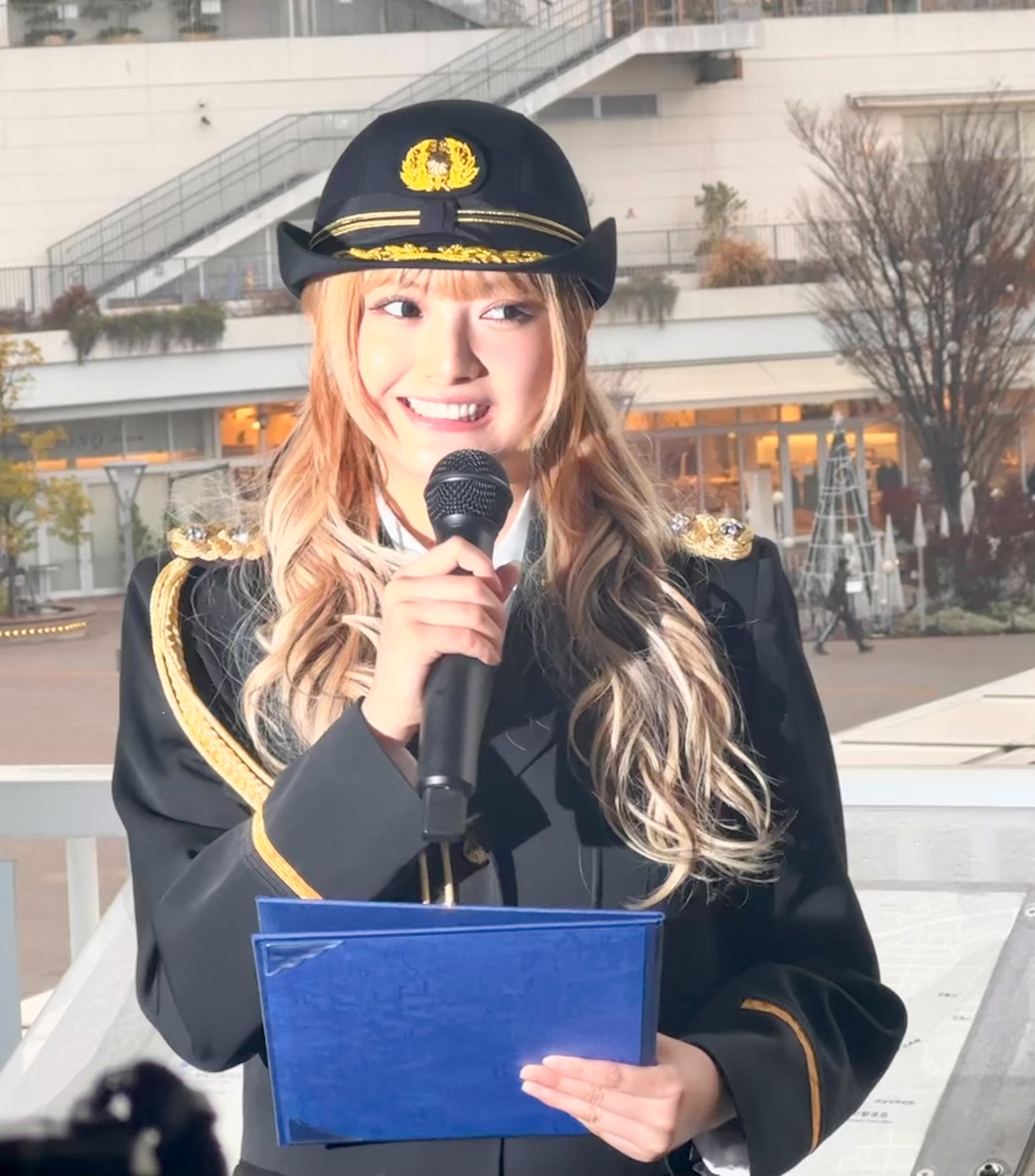
- Anzai in 2023

Background information
- Born: Kalen Anzai (安斉かれん); 15 August 1999 (age 27); Fujisawa, Kanagawa, Japan
- Genres: Pop; Dance-pop; Electronica
- Occupations: Singer-songwriter; actress
- Years active: 2019–present
- Label: Avex Trax
- Relatives: Seira Anzai (sister)
- Website: kalenanzai.com

Kalen Anzai (安斉かれん, Anzai Karen) born 15 August 1999 is a Japanese singer-songwriter and actress. After gaining prominence as a fashion model, she went on to sign with Avex Trax and debuted in May 2019.

Anzai has also appeared in several TV shows, such as M Aisubeki Hito ga Ite (M愛すべき人がいて; M: There's Someone I Love) and Nihon Tōitsu Hokkaidō-hen (日本統一 北海道編; Unity of Japan: Hokkaido).

== Early life ==
Anzai was born on August 15, 1999 and raised in Fujisawa, Kanagawa. Her early interests included learning to play the electone, and being in her junior high school brass band as an alto saxophone player.

In junior high school, her father took her to a Rolling Stones concert; Anzai noticed a saxophone player in the backing band, which inspired her to begin learning to play the instrument herself. In her third year of junior high school, she won the gold prize at the Shonan Regional Brass Band Competition, and again in the ensemble round; she describes this time of her life as "very passionate", coming in early every morning to practice alone.

At 15 years old, Anzai began to write her own lyrics, working from themes and thoughts she wrote as notes on her phone. She describes herself as having taken an early interest in fashion, often recreating popular gyaru looks from magazines.

While Anzai originally learned to write and play music with the intention of being a music teacher or a "behind the scenes person", she eventually became interested in singing lessons: "One day I had the opportunity to sing, and I realized that the voice is also an instrument. I suddenly fell in love with singing". From her first year in high school, Anzai attended Avex's Artist Academy in Harajuku, and continued taking three lessons a week until her debut.

== Career ==
=== 2019-2020: Music debut, M Aisubeki Hito ga Ite ===
After modelling for various companies such as Reflect and Runway, Anzai was chosen as a storefront model for MAC Cosmetics Japan in April, 2019. This marked the first time the brand had worked with a female solo artist, the decision lining up with her debut single "Sekai no Subete Teki ni Kanjite Kodoku Sae Itoshite Ita" on May 1, 2019—the first day of the Reiwa era. Anzai's own interest in gyaru fashion led to initial coverage as the "post-millennial gal", her music also remarked on as being "classic jpop" and of a "90s revival" style.

In February 2020, it was announced that Anzai would star in the docudrama series M Aisubeki Hito ga Ite as Ayumi Hamasaki. The show, based on a novel written by Narumi Komatsu, was a retelling of both Hamasaki's debut years and her relationship with producer Max Matsuura (played by Shohei Miura) in the 90s and early 2000s. Anzai commented later on being "surprised" by the casting decision: "I was surprised, and to be honest, I wondered if I was the right person for the role. (...) I think it's not good to think too much about it, so I'm going to do my best with what I can do." As Anzai had not previously pursued acting classes, she also described having to "work hard" after the announcement, taking full-time acting lessons in the lead-up to filming. The show, which began airing in April 2020, was cut down to seven episodes after COVID-19 pandemic restrictions impacted filming.

On August 29, 2020, Anzai performed at the A-Nation Online 2020 festival; her set included a performance of single "Jinsei wa Senjōda" and a cover of "Come Again" by M-Flo.

In October 2020, Anzai launched Tekuteku Karenda (てくてくかれんだー; It's Kalen!) on Yokohama FM, announcing that "one of her dreams" was to be a regular radio show host.

=== 2021-2023: Anti Heroine ===
Anzai continued to release singles between 2021 and 2023, which culminated in the release of her debut albums Anti Heroine and Bokura wa Kitto Itsuwari Darake no Sekai de Tsuyokunaru in March 2023. After her initial "90s nostalgia" sound, the singer experimented with her style, releasing acoustic ballad, hip-hop, and brass-band inspired tracks: "I just like what I like, and I don't think genre matters... I want to continue experimenting with all sorts of music". Anzai composed some of her own music for the album, as well as being involved in the production stages.

In 2022, Furisode Doll announced an official collaboration with the singer, releasing a limited set of coming of age furisode designs. The collection was inspired by Audrey Hepburn. Later that same year, the "MAC Maker Kalen Anzai" lipstick was released in collaboration with MAC Cosmetics. In August 2023, Anzai released her first photobook "In All"; the singer described the title as being from the phrase "all in love", and serves as a reminder of what her life and work should be about.

In October 2023, Anzai's fan app Karenisto (かれにすと) announced its closure. The app closed down on January 1, 2024.

=== 2024–present: It's Kalen!, acting projects ===
In 2024, Anzai appeared in the TV drama Rikon Shinai Otoko - Sare Otto to Waru Yome no Damashi-ai (離婚しない男-サレ夫と悪嫁の騙し愛; The Man Who Doesn't Divorce), and became a semi-regular guest on the variety show Bukapi! (ブカピ!). In April 2025, it was announced that Anzai will play the lead role in Alivehoon: Beyond the Limit, a sequel to Alivehoon (2022). The release date is set for 2026.

Her radio show, Tekuteku Karenda, continues to air weekly on Yokohoma FM.

== Artistry ==
=== Musical style ===
Anzai has spoken of being inspired by the music her father played growing up, which included The Rolling Stones, Hanoi Rocks, Grease Helmet, and The Cro-Magnons. As she grew older, she began to enjoy classical and pop music in addition to rock and jazz, and has named Ariana Grande, Alicia Keys, and Selena Gomez as her contemporary inspirations. Anzai has also mentioned "Moonlight Densetsu", the theme song for TV anime Sailor Moon, and Yumi Matsutoya's "Sotsugyō Shashin" (卒業写真; Graduation Photo) as being childhood karaoke favorites, and that Sakurako Ohara's "Chippokena Ainōta" (ちっぽけな愛のうた; A Tiny Love Song) is the track that inspired her to pursue singing seriously. "After I started singing, I started listening to a lot of j-pop, and around that time Sakurako-san made her debut." Anzai commented later. "I was always singing her songs, and I even had a bob haircut because I admired her so much".

Anzai has used many genres throughout her releases, such as electro-pop, hip-hop, brass band, acoustic ballad, bedroom-pop, and rock, and often experiments in her composition and music production style. "The lyrics alone didn't convey enough anxiety," Anzai said of her work on "Gal-Trap", a 2020 single. "I couldn't find the right words, so I sampled sounds from everyday life: the sound of picking at your nail polish, sighs, and other sounds that come out to fill the silence between two people".

Max Matsuura, who signed Anzai for Avex, spoke of the singer having "over a hundred demos", all with her own lyrics. Of her debut, he said: "Her singing habits were bad, but the voice itself was good. (...) She reminded me of Ayumi Hamasaki." While he praised her writing and composition abilities, Matsuura admitted to planning her debut to have a 90s style due to that first impression; this led to Anzai being labelled "the girl inheriting the legacy of Avex's divas" by the media.

=== Lyrics ===
Anzai began to write lyrics at the age of 15, writing thoughts and theme ideas on her phone to draw upon later. Throughout her career, Anzai has used personal anecdotes and experiences in her work, and has been described as being able to include "a lot of heart"; an example of this is her debut single, which explored the isolation and regret the singer felt over missing friend hangouts and school events due to work commitments.

Some of her work is also inspired by movies and novels, Anzai listing Snakes and Earrings, Helter-Skelter, and Thirst (2013) as stories that have "made (her) want to start writing lyrics immediately". Of her workflow, she has said "If I sit down at a desk and try to write something, I can't. I can only write at the moment I'm feeling something."

== Personal life ==
Anzai was born and raised in Fujisawa, Kanagawa. She owns a Pekingese-Chihuahua dog called Zero, and describes herself as an "indoor person" who likes spending time alone.

Her younger sister, Seira Anzai, also works in the media industry as an actress, fashion model, and TV personality. She made her debut on the reality TV show Niji to Ōkami ni wa Damasarenai (虹とオオカミには騙されない; Don't be Fooled by Rainbows and Wolves) in 2021 during her third year of high school.

== Discography ==
=== Singles ===
- Sekai no Subete Teki ni Kanjite Kodoku Sae Itoshite Ita (世界の全て敵に感じて孤独さえ愛していた;When the World was My Enemy, I Began to Love Even My Solitude) (2019)
- Dareka no Raise no Yume Demo ī (誰かの来世の夢でもいい; Someone's Dream for Another World) (2019)
- Jinsei wa Senjōda (人生は戦場だ; Life is a Battlefield) (2019)
- Fake News Revolution (2020)
- Bokura wa Tsuyoku Nareru (僕らは強くなれる; We Can Be Strong) (2020)
- Gal-Trap (2020)
- Secret Love (2020)
- Kimitoboku no Uta (キミとボクの歌; A Song for You and Me) (2021)
- 18 no Tōkyō (18の東京; Tokyo 18) (2021)
- Yoru wa Mikansei (夜は未完成;The Incomplete Night) (2021)
- Genjitsu Kamera (現実カメラ; Reality Camera) (2021)
- Isshū-me no Fuyu (一周目の冬; First Winter) (2022)
- Chanto Sekai-Sen (ちゃんと世界線;The Same World Path) (2022)
- Fuminshō☆Hai Tengoku (不眠症☆廃天国; Insomnia☆Abandoned Heaven) (2022)
- Mirai no Oto (未来の音; Sound of the Future) (2022)
- Yoloop (2023)
- Ren'ai Shūhen (恋愛周辺; Love Circumference) (2023)
- Gibumī♡Sutotpu (ギブミー♡すとっぷ; Give Me♡Stop) (2023)
- O ̄ru, Beji♪ (おーる、べじ♪; Oh, Veggie♪) (2023)

=== Albums ===
- Anti Heroine (2023)
- Bokura wa Kitto Itsuwari Darake no Sekai de Tsuyokunaru (僕らはきっと偽りだらけの世界で強くなる; We Will Surely Become Stronger in a World Full of Lies) (2023)

=== Compilation Albums ===
- Avex Revival Trax (2020)

== Filmography ==
=== Film ===
Year	Title	Role	Notes	Ref.
2022	Chotto Omoidashita Dake	Taxi passenger	Supporting role	
2026	Alivehoon: Beyond the Limit	Chihaya Kudo	Lead role	

=== Television ===
Year	Title	Role	Notes	Ref.
2020	M Aisubeki Hito ga Ite	Ayumi Hamasaki	Co-lead role	
2022	Nihon Tōitsu Hokkaidō-hen	Hostess	Guest appearance	
2024	Rikon Shinai Otoko	Koi	Supporting role	
